= Amsterdam =

Capital and largest city of the Netherlands

- Capital city and municipality
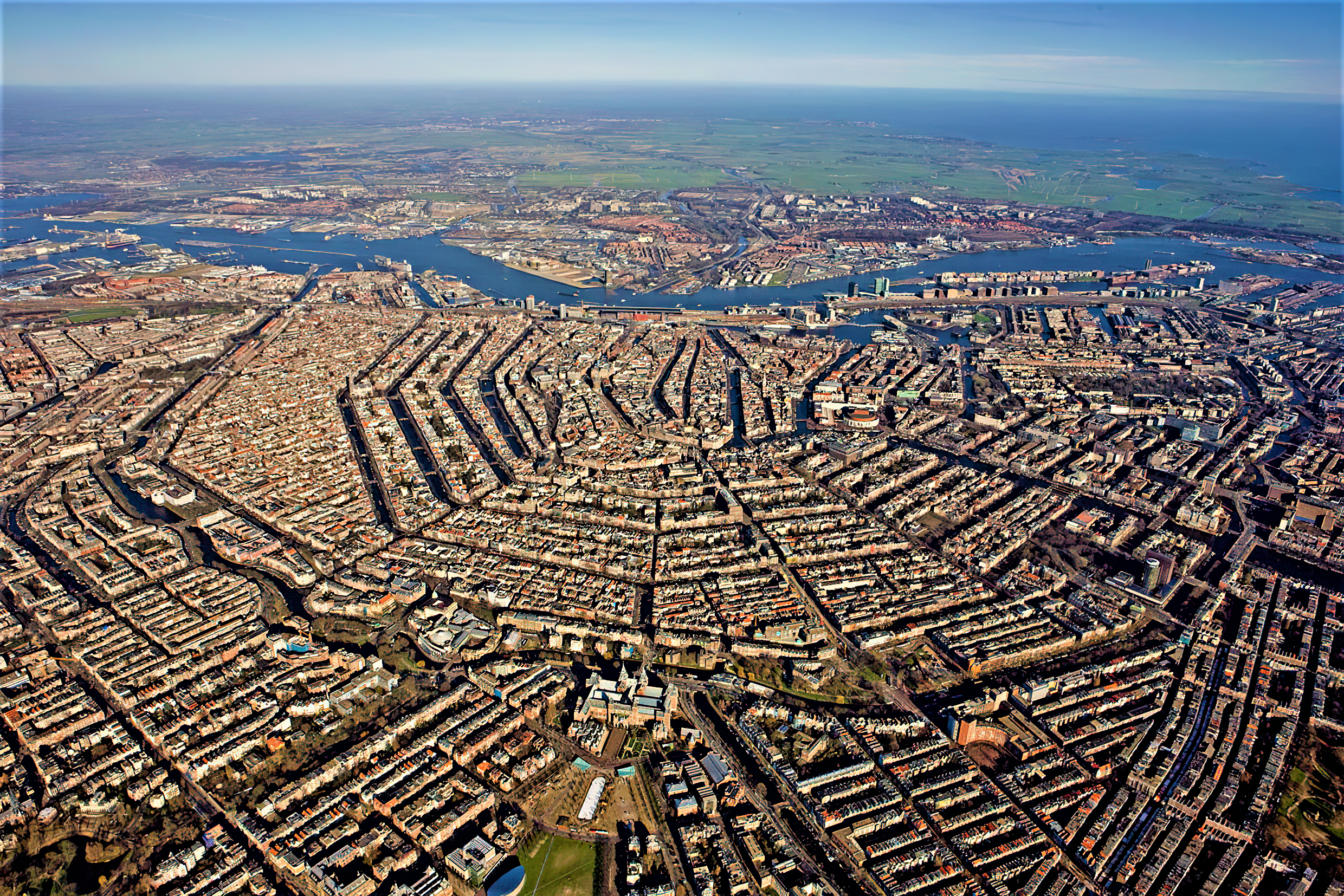
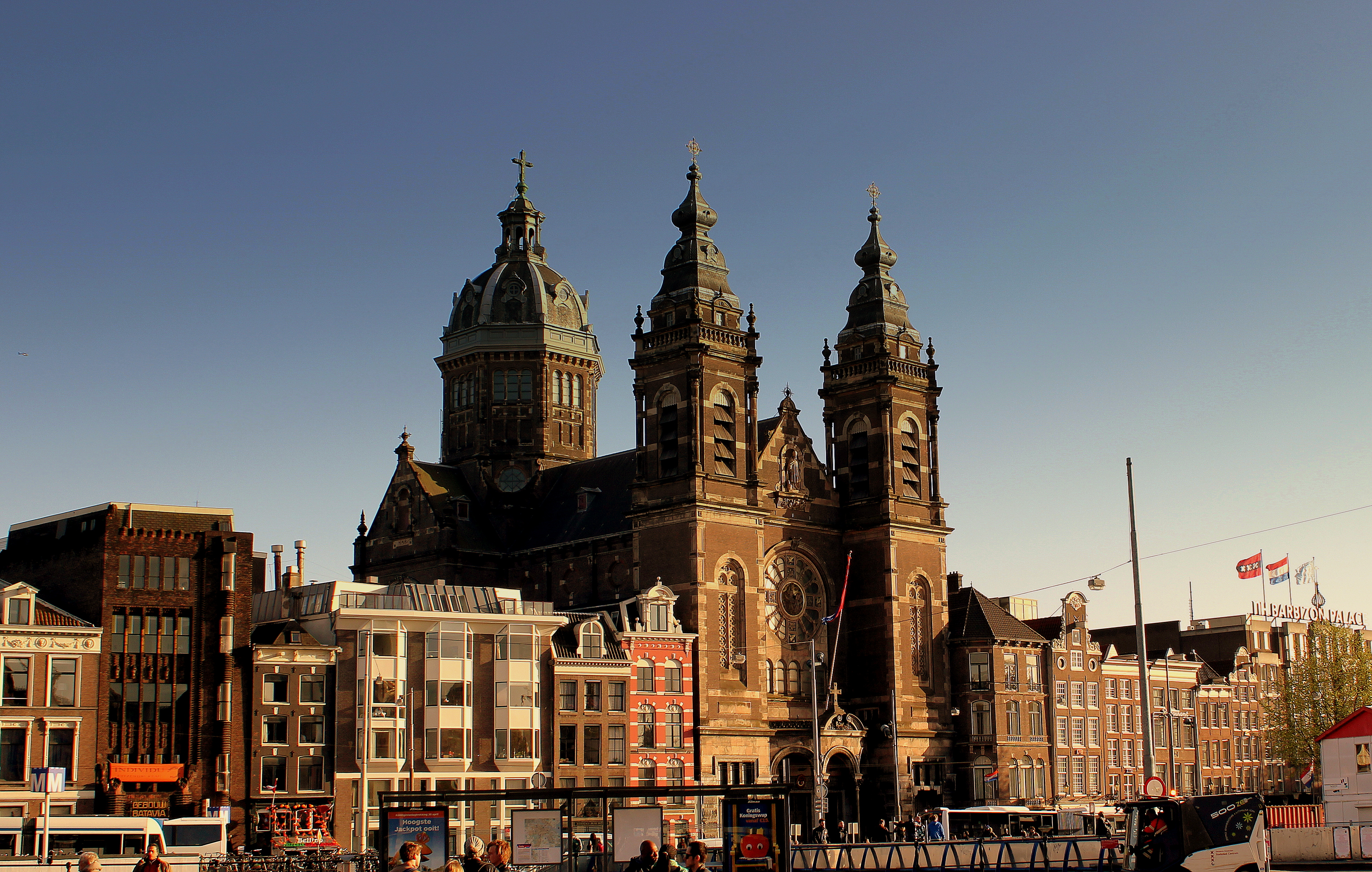
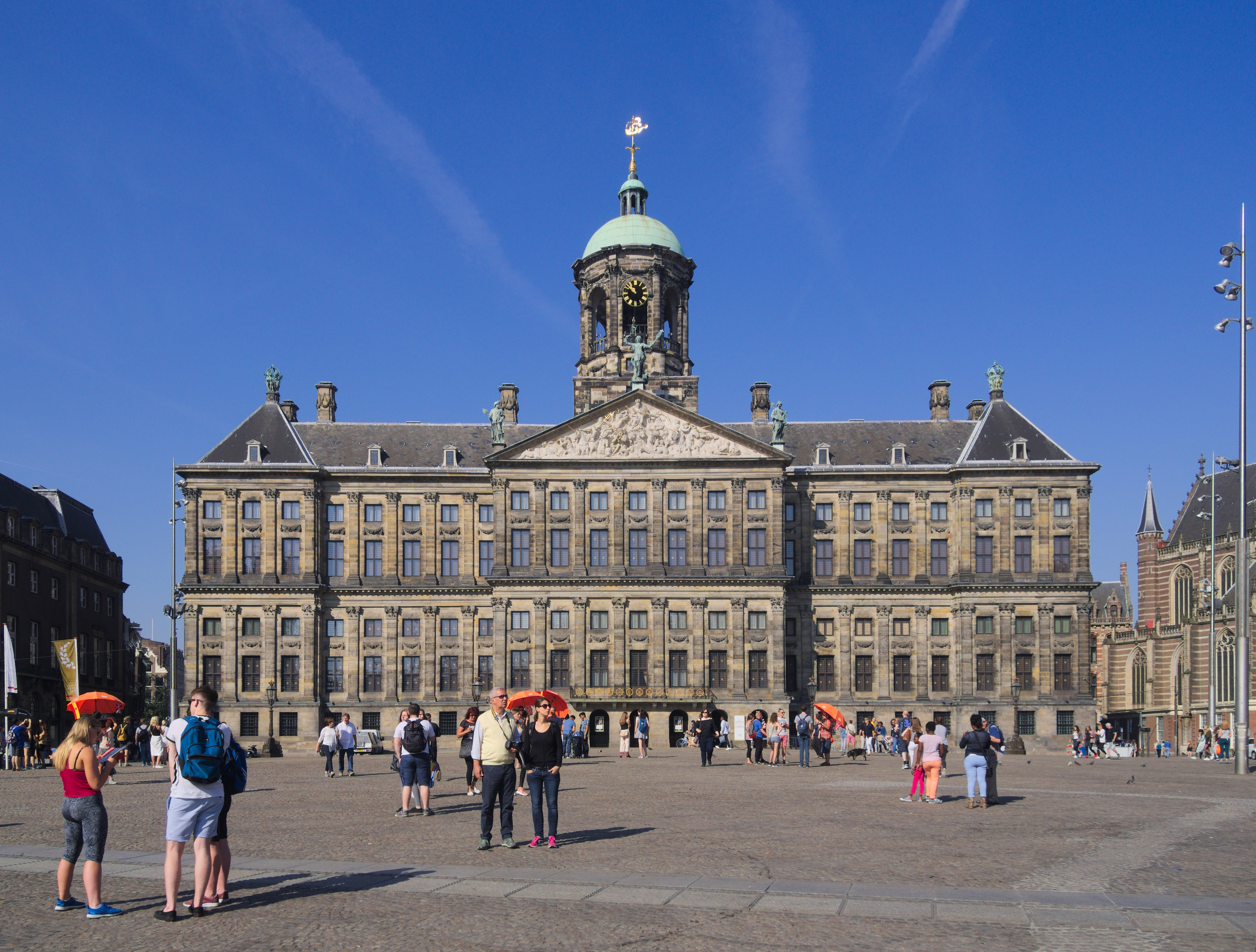
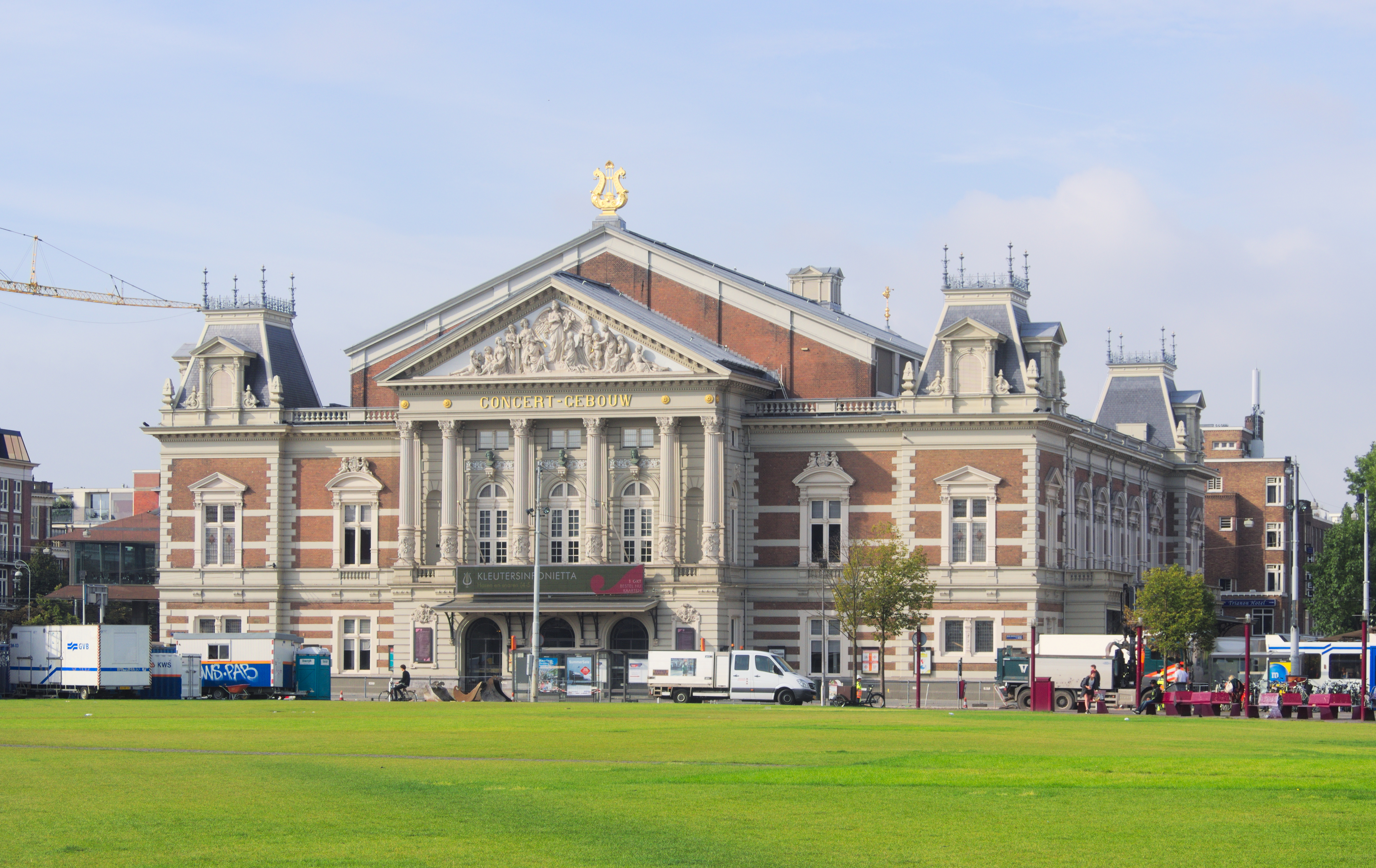
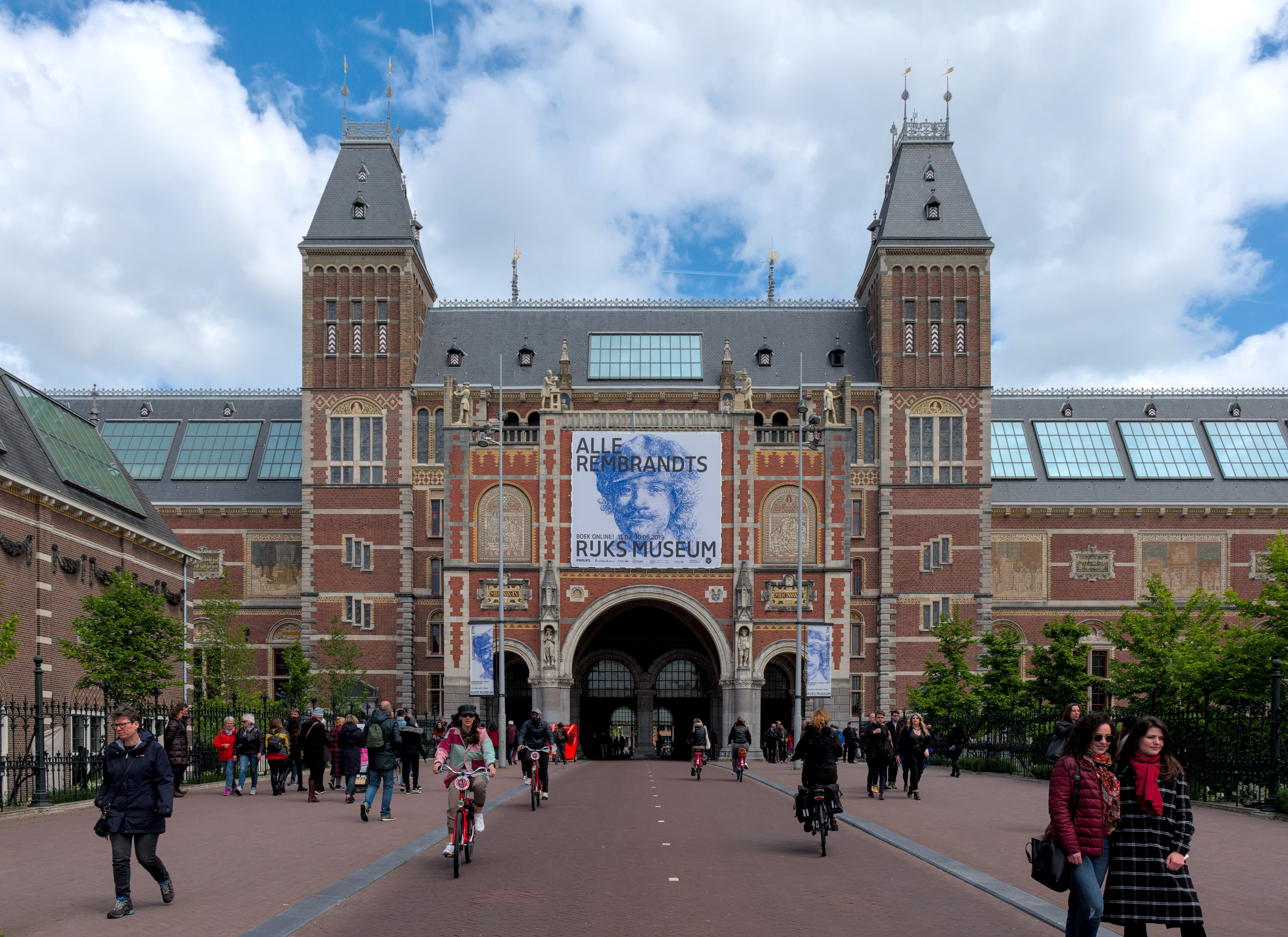
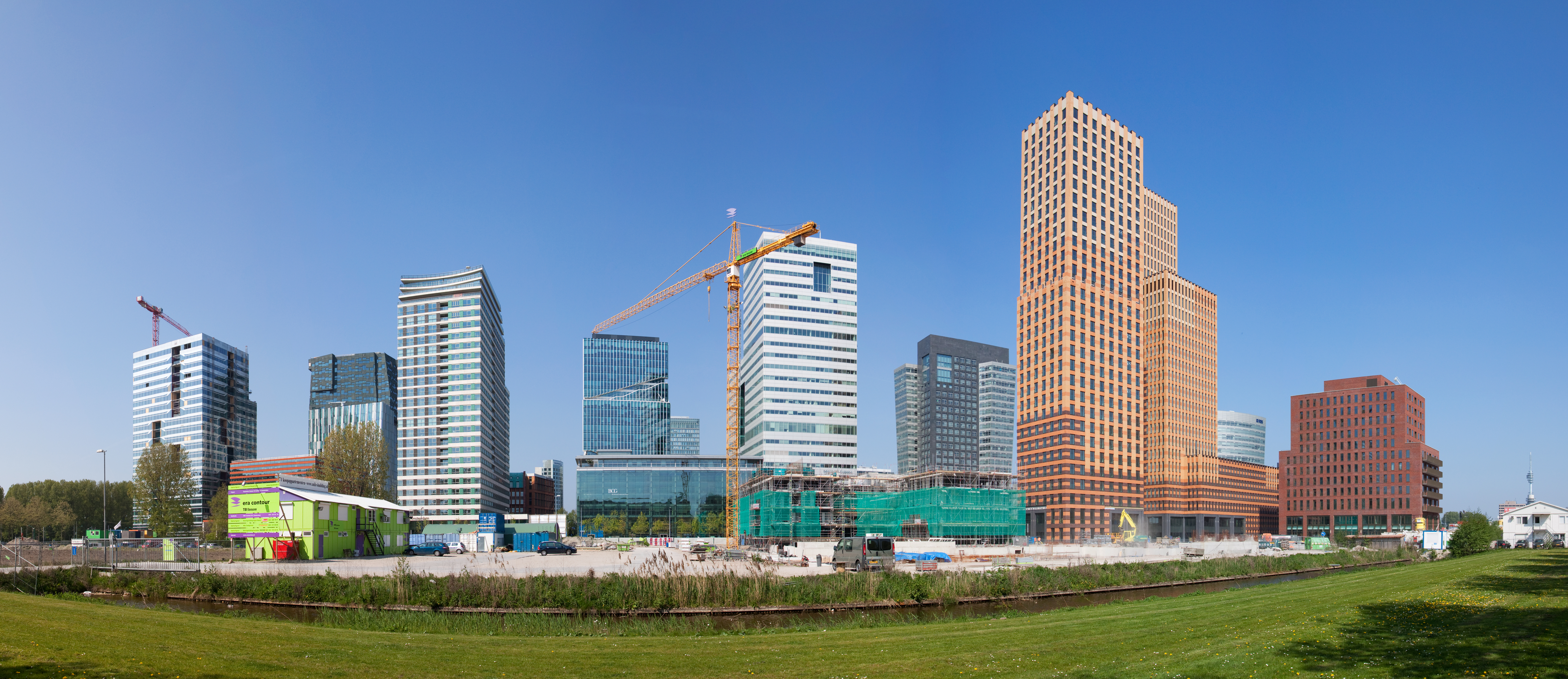
- View of the canals of Amsterdam Basilica of St. Nicholas Royal Palace Royal Concertgebouw Rijksmuseum Zuidas Business District

- Flag Coat of arms Logo
- Nicknames: The Venice of the North, Mokum, Damsko
- Motto: Heldhaftig, Vastberaden, Barmhartig (Valiant, Steadfast, Compassionate)
- Location of Amsterdam municipality
- Interactive map of Amsterdam
- Location within Netherlands Location within Europe
- Coordinates: 52°22′22″N 04°53′37″E
- Country: Netherlands
- Province: North Holland
- Region: Metropolitan Region Amsterdam
- Founded: c. 1275; 751 years ago
- City Hall: Stopera
- Boroughs: 7 boroughs, 1 urban area: Centrum; Nieuw-West; Noord; Oost; Weesp; West; Zuid; Zuidoost

Government
  - Body: Municipal council
  - Mayor: Femke Halsema (PRO)

Area
  - Municipality: 219.32 km^{2} (84.68 sq mi)
  - Land: 165.76 km^{2} (64.00 sq mi)
  - Water: 53.56 km^{2} (20.68 sq mi)
  - Metro region: 2,580.26 km^{2} (996.24 sq mi)
  - Randstad: 6,296.91 km^{2} (2,431.25 sq mi)
- Elevation: −2 m (−6.6 ft)

Population (May 2026)
  - Municipality: 946,447
  - Rank: 1st
  - Density: 5,691/km^{2} (14,740/sq mi)
  - Urban: 1,496,215
  - Metro region: 2,480,394
  - Randstad: 8,116,000
- Demonym: Amsterdammer

GDP
  - Metro region: €201.100 billion (2022)
  - Randstad: €602.711 billion (2024)
- Time zone: UTC+1 (CET)
  - Summer (DST): UTC+2 (CEST)
- Postcode: 1000–1183
- Area code: 020
- Climate: Temperate oceanic climate (Cfb)
- GeoTLD: .amsterdam
- Website: amsterdam.nl

UNESCO World Heritage Site
- Official name: Seventeenth-Century Canal Ring Area of Amsterdam inside the Singelgracht
- Criteria: Cultural: i, ii, iv
- Reference: 1349
- Inscription: 2010 (34th Session)
- Area: 198,2 ha

Amsterdam (Dutch: [ˌɑmstərˈdɑm]; lit. 'Dam in the Amstel') is the capital (Note: Amsterdam is the constitutional capital, while the government and the royal family are seated in The Hague) and largest city of the Netherlands. As of 1 January 2026, it had a population of 941,873 within the city proper, 1,457,018 in the urban area and 2,480,394 in the metropolitan area. Located in the Dutch province of North Holland, Amsterdam is colloquially referred to as the "Venice of the North", for its large number of canals, now a UNESCO World Heritage Site.

Amsterdam was founded at the mouth of the Amstel river, which was dammed to control flooding. Originally a small fishing village in the 12th century, Amsterdam became a major world port during the Dutch Golden Age of the 17th century, when the Netherlands was an economic powerhouse. Amsterdam was the leading centre for finance and trade, as well as a hub of secular art production. In the 19th and 20th centuries, the city expanded and new neighborhoods and suburbs were built. The city has a long tradition of openness, liberalism, and tolerance. Cycling is key to the city's modern character, and there are numerous biking paths and lanes spread throughout.

Amsterdam's main attractions include its historic canals; the Rijksmuseum, the state museum with Dutch Golden Age art; the Van Gogh Museum; the Dam Square, where the Royal Palace of Amsterdam and former city hall are located; the Amsterdam Museum; Stedelijk Museum, with modern art; the Concertgebouw concert hall; the Anne Frank House; the Scheepvaartmuseum, the Natura Artis Magistra; Hortus Botanicus, NEMO, the red-light district and cannabis coffee shops. The city is known for its nightlife and festival activity, with several nightclubs among the world's most famous. Its artistic heritage, canals, and narrow canal houses with gabled façades, well-preserved legacies of the city's 17th-century Golden Age, have attracted millions of visitors annually.

The Amsterdam Stock Exchange, founded in 1602, is considered the oldest "modern" securities market stock exchange in the world. As the commercial capital of the Netherlands and one of the top financial centres in Europe, Amsterdam is considered an alpha-world city. The city is the cultural capital of the Netherlands. Many large Dutch institutions have their headquarters in the city. Many of the world's largest companies are based in Amsterdam or have established their European headquarters there, such as technology companies Uber, Netflix, and Tesla. Although Amsterdam is the official capital of the Netherlands, it is not the seat of government. The main governmental institutions, and foreign embassies, are located in The Hague.

In 2022, Amsterdam was ranked the ninth-best city to live in by the Economist Intelligence Unit and 12th on quality of living for environment and infrastructure by Mercer. The city was ranked 4th place globally as a top tech hub in 2019. The Port of Amsterdam is the fourth-largest in Europe. The KLM hub and Amsterdam's main airport, Schiphol, is the busiest airport in the Netherlands, and third in Europe. The Dutch capital is one of the most multicultural cities in the world, with about 180 nationalities represented. Immigration and ethnic segregation in Amsterdam is a current issue.

Amsterdam's notable residents throughout its history include painters Rembrandt and Vincent van Gogh, 17th-century philosophers Baruch Spinoza, John Locke, René Descartes, and John Amos Comenius, and Holocaust victim and diarist Anne Frank.

== History ==
=== Prehistory ===
Due to its geographical location in what used to be wet peatland, the founding of Amsterdam is later than other urban centres in the Low Countries. However, around the area of what later became Amsterdam, farmers settled as early as three millennia ago. They lived along the prehistoric IJ river and upstream of its tributary the Amstel. The prehistoric IJ was a shallow and quiet stream in peatland behind beach ridges. This secluded area was able to grow into an important local settlement centre, especially in the late Bronze Age, the Iron Age and the Roman Age. Neolithic and Roman artefacts have also been found in the prehistoric Amstel bedding under Amsterdam's Damrak and Rokin, such as shards of Bell Beaker culture pottery (2200–2000 BC) and a granite grinding stone (2700–2750 BC), but the location of these artefacts around the river banks of the Amstel probably points to the presence of a modest semi-permanent or seasonal settlement. Until water issues were controlled, a permanent settlement would not have been possible, for during this period the river mouth and the banks of the Amstel were too wet for permanent habitation.

=== Founding ===
The origins of Amsterdam are linked to the development of a dam on the Amstel River called Amestelle, meaning 'watery area', from Aa(m) 'river' + stelle 'site at a shoreline', 'river bank'. In this area, land reclamation started as early as the late 10th century. Amestelle was located along a side arm of the IJ. This sidearm took its name from the eponymous land: Amstel. Amestelle was inhabited by farmers, who lived more inland and more upstream, where the land was not as wet as at the banks of the downstream river mouth. These farmers were starting the reclamation around upstream Ouderkerk aan de Amstel, and later at the other side of the river at Amstelveen. The Van Amstel family, known in documents by this name since 1019, held the stewardship in this northwestern nook of the ecclesiastical district of the bishop of Utrecht. The family later served also under the count of Holland.

A major turning point in the development of the Amstel River mouth was the All Saint's Flood of 1170. In an extremely short time, the shallow river IJ turned into a wide estuary, which from then on offered the Amstel an open connection to the Zuiderzee, IJssel, and waterways further afield. This made the water flow of the Amstel more active, so excess water could be drained better. With drier banks, the downstream Amstel mouth became attractive for permanent habitation. Moreover, the river had grown from an insignificant peat stream into a junction of international waterways. A settlement was built here immediately after the landscape change of 1170. Right from the start of its foundation it focused on traffic, production, and trade; not on farming, as opposed to how communities had lived further upstream for the past 200 years and northward for thousands of years. The construction of a dam at the mouth of the Amstel, eponymously named Dam, is historically estimated to have occurred between 1264 and 1275. The settlement first appeared in a document from 1275, concerning a road toll granted by the count of Holland Floris V to the residents apud Amestelledamme 'at the dam in the Amstel' or 'at the dam of Amstelland'. This allowed the inhabitants of the village to travel freely through the County of Holland, paying no tolls at bridges, locks and dams. This was a move in a years-long struggle for power in the area between the count of Holland and the Amstel family who governed the area on behalf of the bishop of Utrecht. By 1327, the name had developed into Aemsterdam.

=== Middle Ages ===
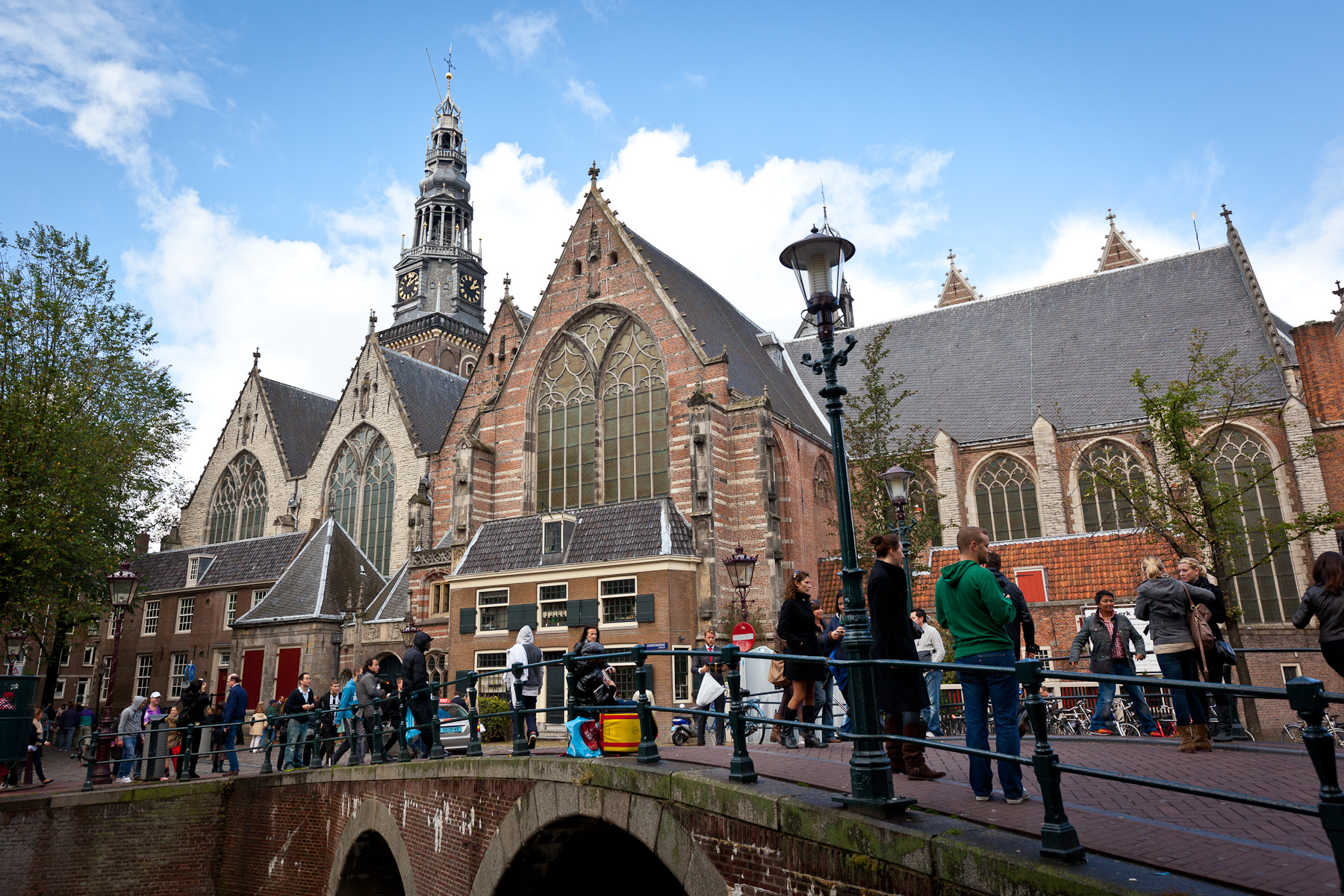
The Oude Kerk was consecrated in 1306 AD.

The bishop of Utrecht granted Amsterdam zone rights in either 1300 or 1306. The Mirakel van Amsterdam in 1345 rendered the city an important place of pilgrimage. During the heyday of the Stille Omgang, which became the expression of the pilgrimage after the Protestant Reformation, up to 90,000 pilgrims came to Amsterdam.

From the 14th century on, Amsterdam flourished, largely from trade with the Hanseatic League. From the 15th century on the city established an independent trade route with the Baltic Sea in grain and timber, cutting out the Hanseatic League as middlemen. The city became the staple market of Europe for bulk cargo. This was made possible due to innovations in the herring fishery, from which Amsterdam reaped great wealth. Herring had demand in markets all around Europe. Inventions of on-board gibbing and the haringbuis in 1415, made longer voyages feasible and hence enabled Dutch fishermen to follow the herring shoals far from the coasts, giving them a monopoly in the industry.

The herring industry relied on international trade cooperation and large initial investments in ships. This required many highly skilled and unskilled workers to cooperate, as well as the import of the necessary raw materials to turn an unfinished product into a marketable one. This required merchants to then sell it throughout the continent and bookkeepers and accountants to divide the profit. In short, the herring industry was setting up the foundations for what would later become the transcontinental trade system and the Dutch Golden Age, with Amsterdam at its centre, hence the saying "Amsterdam is built on Herringbones".

=== War with Spanish Empire ===
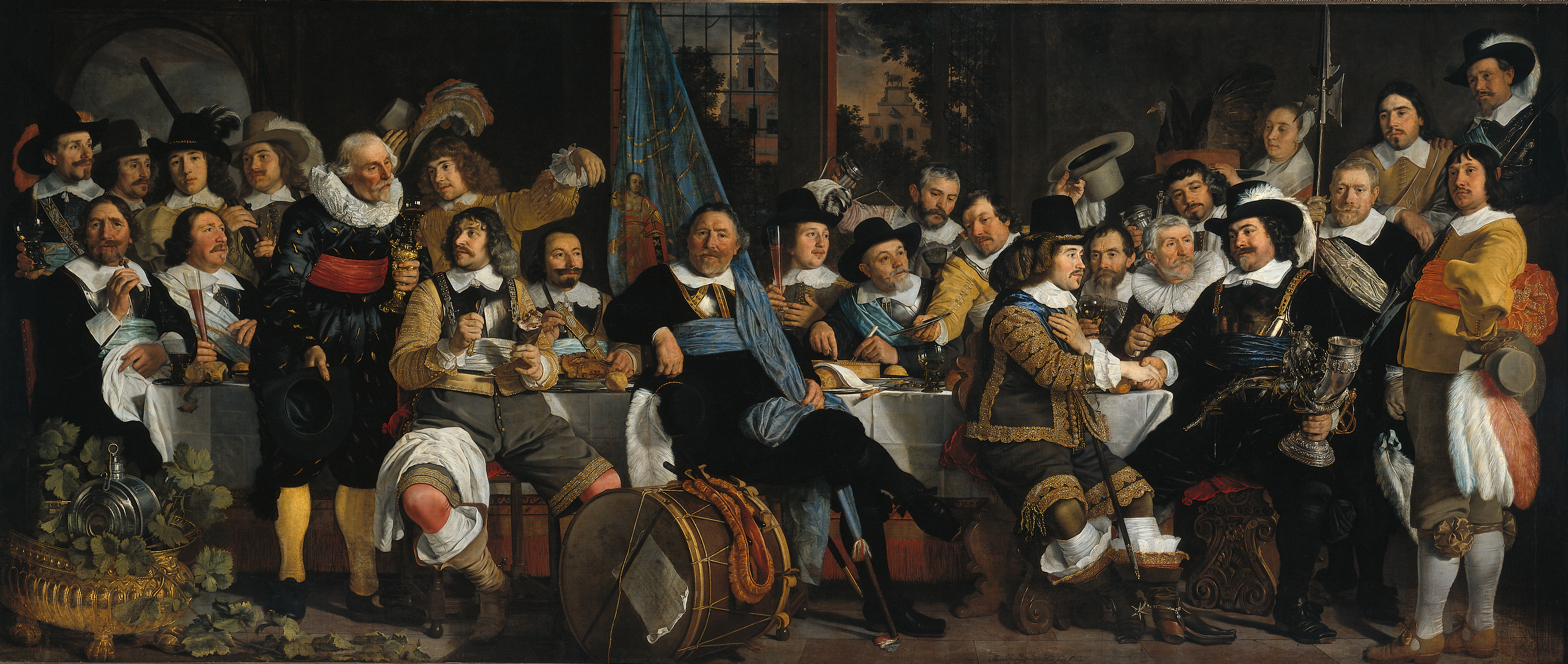
Amsterdam citizens celebrating the Peace of Münster, 30 January 1648. Painting by Bartholomeus van der Helst

The Low Countries were part of the Habsburg inheritance and came under the Spanish Empire in the early sixteenth century. The Dutch rebelled against Philip II of Spain, who led a defense of Catholicism during the Protestant Reformation. The main reasons for the uprising were the imposition of new taxes, the tenth penny, and the religious persecution of Protestants by the newly introduced Inquisition. The revolt escalated into the Eighty Years' War, which ultimately led to Dutch independence. Strongly pushed by Dutch Revolt leader William the Silent, the Dutch Republic became known for its relative religious tolerance. Jews from the Iberian Peninsula, Protestant Huguenots from France, prosperous merchants, and printers from Flanders, and economic and religious refugees from the Spanish-controlled parts of the Low Countries found safety in Amsterdam. The influx of Flemish printers and the city's intellectual tolerance made Amsterdam a centre for the European free press.

=== Centre of the Dutch Golden Age ===
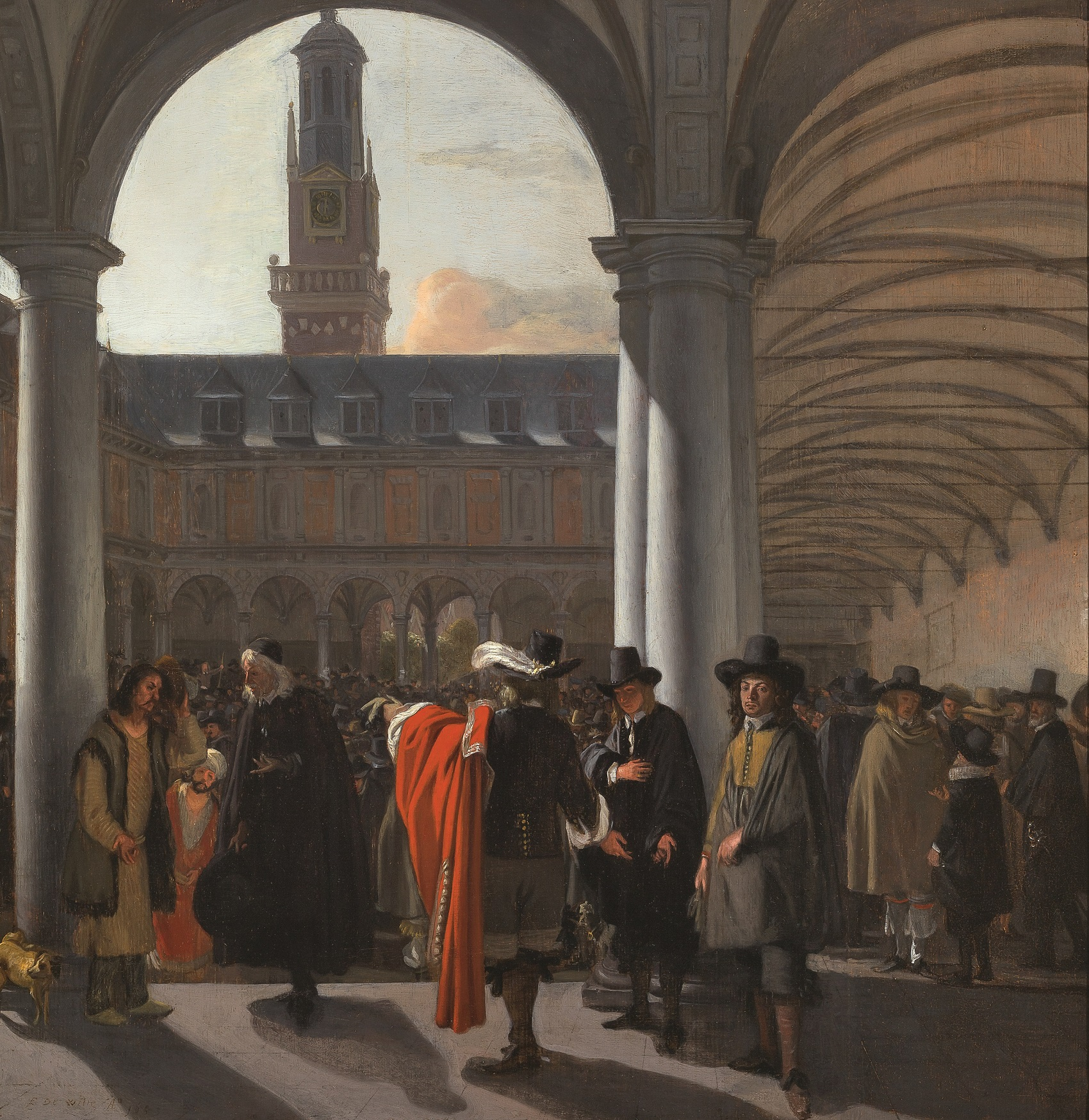
Courtyard of the Amsterdam Stock Exchange by Emanuel de Witte, 1653. The Amsterdam Stock Exchange was the first stock exchange to introduce continuous trade in the early 17th century.

During the 17th century, Amsterdam experienced what is considered its Golden Age, during which it became the wealthiest city in the Western world. Ships sailed from Amsterdam to the Baltic Sea, the Caribbean, North America, and Africa, as well as present-day Indonesia, India, Sri Lanka, and Brazil, forming the basis of a worldwide trading network. Amsterdam's merchants had the largest share in both the Dutch East India Company (VOC) and the Dutch West India Company. These companies acquired overseas possessions that later became Dutch colonies.

Amsterdam was Europe's most important hub for the shipment of goods and was the leading financial centre of the Western world. In 1602, the Amsterdam office of the Dutch East India Company became the world's first stock exchange by trading in its own shares. The Bank of Amsterdam started operations in 1609, acting as a full-service bank for Dutch merchant bankers and as a reserve bank.

From the 17th century onwards, Amsterdam also became involved in the Atlantic slave trade. The city was a major destination port for Dutch slave ships participating in the triangular trade, which lasted until the United Netherlands abolished the Netherlands' involvement in the trade in 1814 at the request of the British government.

=== Decline and modernization ===
Amsterdam's prosperity declined during the 18th and early 19th centuries. The wars of the Dutch Republic with England (latterly, Great Britain) and France took their toll on the city. During the French Revolutionary Wars and the Napoleonic Wars, Amsterdam's significance reached its lowest point, with Holland being absorbed into the French Empire. However, the later establishment of the United Kingdom of the Netherlands in 1815 marked a turning point.

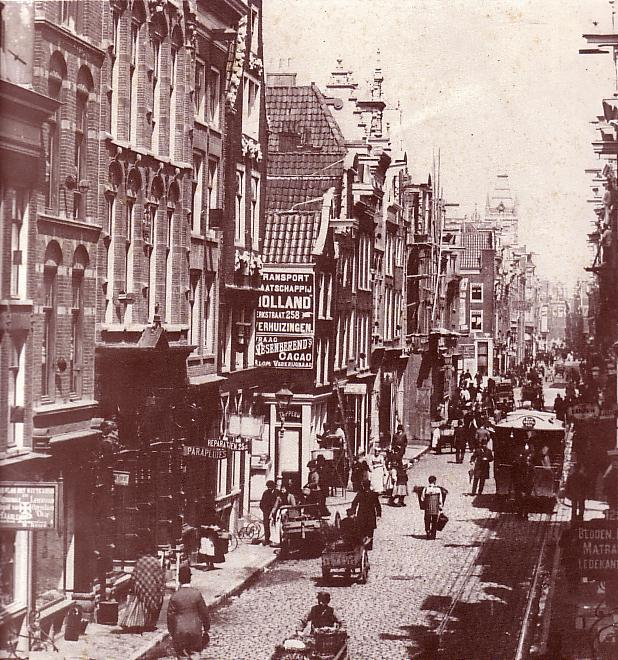
View of Vijzelstraat looking towards the Muntplein, 1891

The end of the 19th century is sometimes called Amsterdam's second Golden Age. New museums, a railway station, and the Concertgebouw were built; At the same time, the Industrial Revolution reached the city. The North Sea Canal, opened in 1876, provided Amsterdam's port with a direct route to the North Sea and contributed to a revival of maritime trade. The Merwede Canal, completed in 1892, improved inland shipping connections from Amsterdam towards the Rhine. In 1906, Joseph Conrad gave a brief description of Amsterdam as seen from the seaside, in The Mirror of the Sea.

=== 20th century – present ===
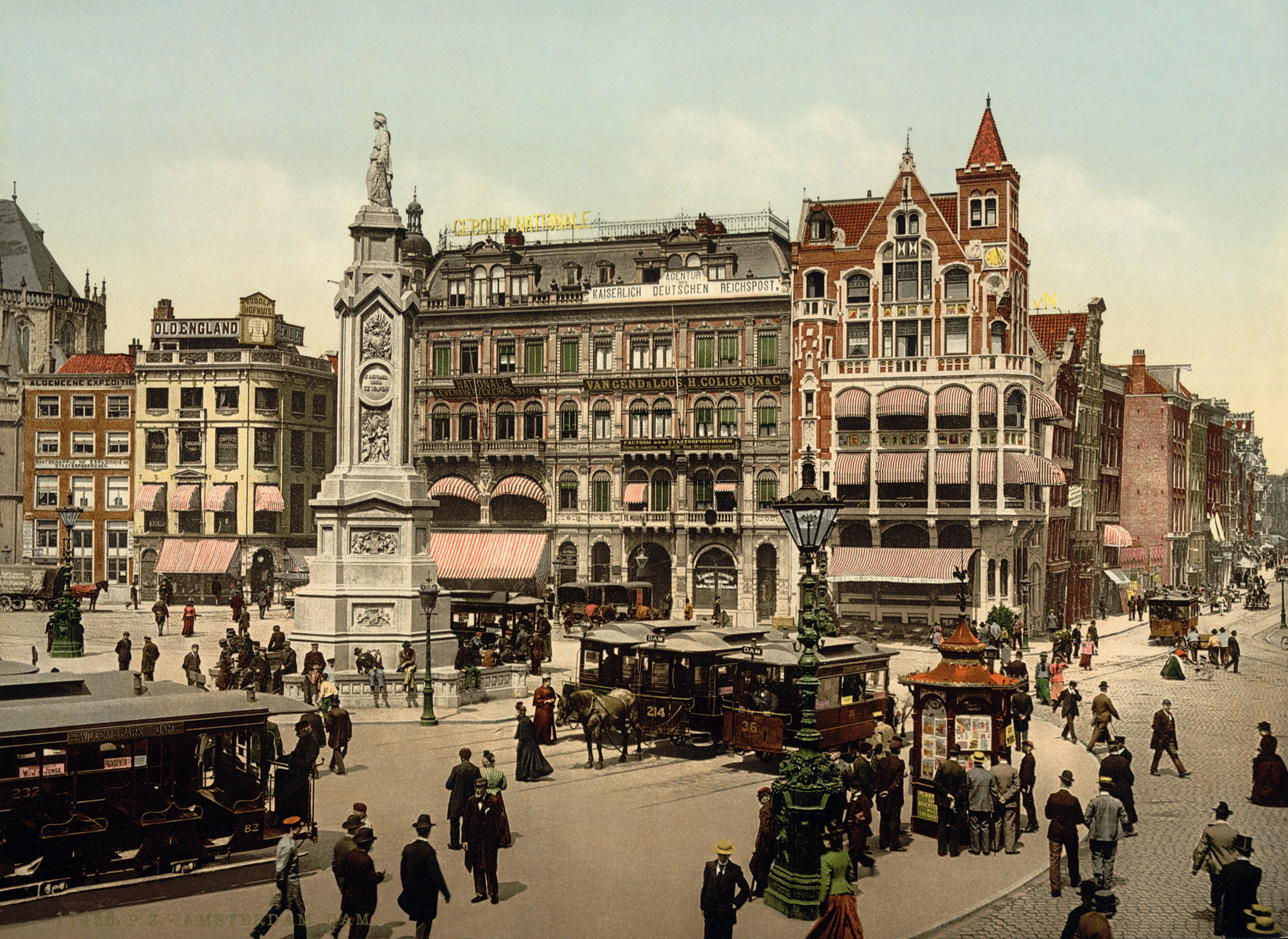
Photochrom of Amsterdam's Dam Square at the beginning of the 20th century

Shortly before the First World War, the city started to expand again, and new suburbs were built. Even though the Netherlands remained neutral in this war, Amsterdam suffered a food shortage, and heating fuel became scarce. The shortages sparked riots in which several people were killed. These riots are known as the Aardappeloproer (Potato Rebellion). People started looting stores and warehouses to get supplies, mainly food.

On 1 January 1921, after a flood in 1916, the depleted municipalities of Durgerdam, Holysloot, Zunderdorp and Schellingwoude (all lying north of Amsterdam) were, at their own request, annexed to the city. Between the wars, the city continued to expand, most notably to the west of the Jordaan district in the Frederik Hendrikbuurt and surrounding neighbourhoods.

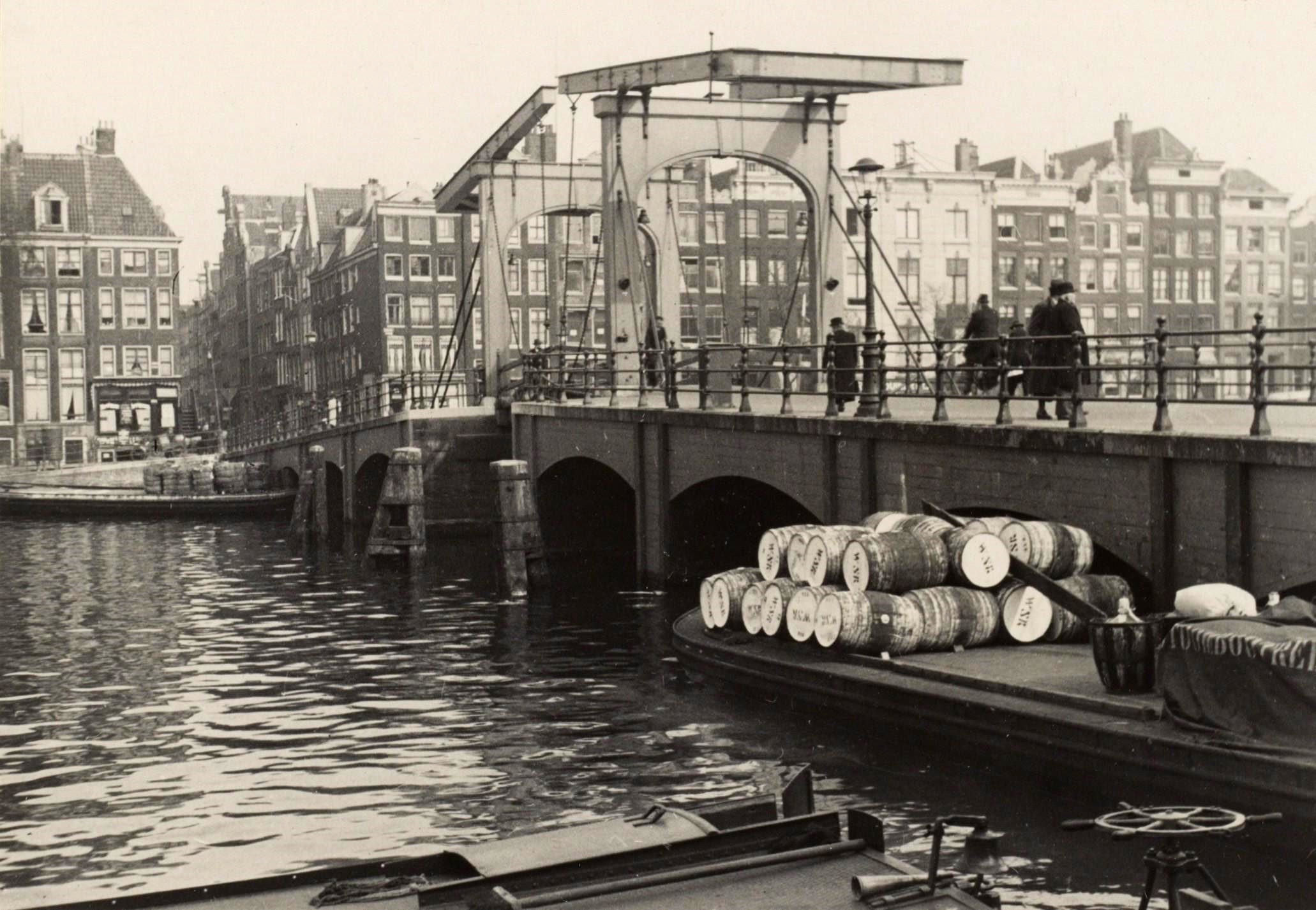
The rebuilt Magere Brug around 1938

Nazi Germany invaded the Netherlands on 10 May 1940 and took control of the country. Some Amsterdam citizens sheltered Jews, thereby exposing themselves and their families to a high risk of being imprisoned or sent to concentration camps. More than 100,000 Dutch Jews were deported and murdered in Nazi concentration camps, including 56,521 victims in Auschwitz and a further number of 34,082 accounted for in Sobibor. Around 60,000 Jewish inhabitants, including Jewish prewar refugees from Austria and Germany, were living in Amsterdam at the time of the Nazi occupation. Only those provided with a safe haven, avoiding deportation and denunciation, or the very few who returned from the camps at the end of the war, managed to survive.

At first the German occupation authorities were very cautious, wanting to convince the city inhabitants of their sincerity. However, their outlook soon turned to cynicism and brutality. A cause in the change of their behaviour was an attack by a Dutch resistance fighter against a collaborator belonging to the paramilitary Dutch fascist organisation, the NSB. The injured man died and in response Heinrich Himmler ordered reprisals. 427 Amsterdam Jews were arrested on 22 February 1941 and sent to Mauthausen concentration camp. Only two people survived.

Incensed, a broad spectrum of passive resistance was organized by the Dutch Underground. Trade unions, among them socialist and Communist Party activists, led the protest. Their outcry received support from white collar employees in the civil service and support from the local diocese of the Church. Approval was also given and encouraged by the Dutch government-in-exile under Queen Wilhelmina in London.

The German authorities were taken completely by surprise by the level of resistance known as the February strike. 300,000 people participated in the protest against the arrests of Jews. However, the occupier soon responded crudely and brutally, smashing union and illegal party activity. With the edifice of resistance removed the SS and German police apparatus, supported by collaborators in the Dutch auxiliary police, arrested thousands of defenceless Jews in Amsterdam's Jewish Quarter. The two main waves of arrest, culminating in deportation, occurred on 26 May 1943 and on 20 June 1943.

The most famous deportee was the young Jewish girl Anne Frank, whose safe hiding place with her family was betrayed and discovered in August, 1944. After a spell at the 'holding camp' in Westerbork Anna and her family were sent to Auschwitz, where her mother was murdered. From there she and her sister Margot were moved onto Bergen-Belsen concentration camp where they died amidst appalling and inhumane conditions in early 1945.

At the end of the Second World War, and as a consequence of the Nazi occupation, Amsterdam was in a state of crisis. Communication with the rest of the country broke down, and food and fuel became scarce. Many citizens traveled to the countryside to forage. Dogs, cats, raw sugar beets, and tulip bulbs—cooked to a pulp—were consumed to stay alive. Many trees in Amsterdam were cut down for fuel, and wood was taken from the houses, apartments and other buildings of deported Jews. The city was finally liberated by Canadian forces on 5 May 1945, shortly before the end of the war in Europe.

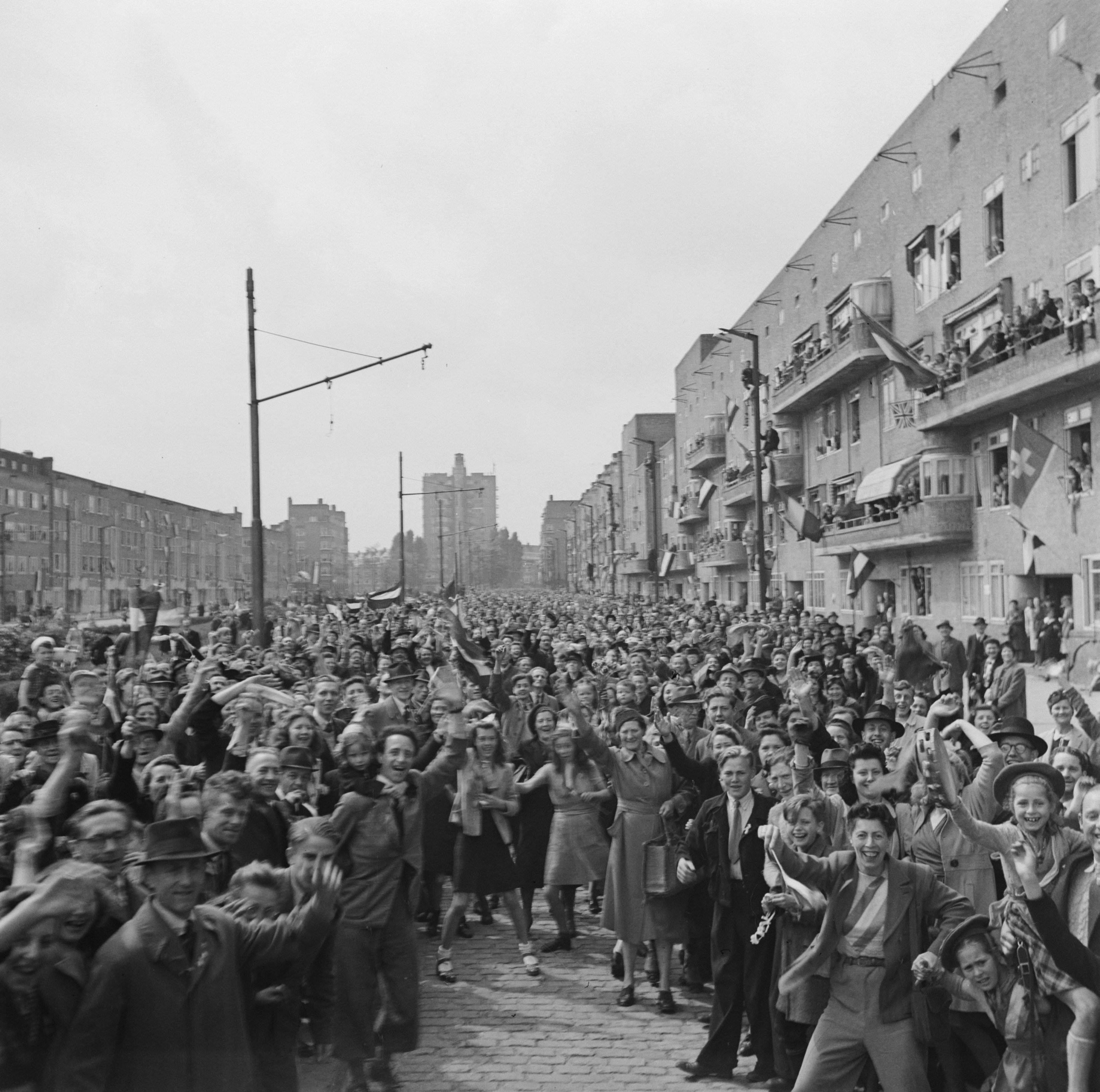
People celebrating the liberation of the Netherlands at the end of World War II on 8 May 1945

The Amsterdam–Rhine Canal opened to shipping in May 1952, replacing the older Merwede Canal as the principal inland shipping route between Amsterdam and the Rhine basin.

Many new suburbs, such as Osdorp, Slotervaart, Slotermeer and Geuzenveld, were built in the years after the Second World War. These suburbs contained many public parks and wide-open spaces, and the new buildings provided improved housing conditions with larger and brighter rooms, gardens, and balconies. Because of the war and other events of the 20th century, almost the entire city centre had fallen into disrepair. As society was changing, politicians and other influential figures made plans to redesign large parts of it. There was an increasing demand for office buildings, and also for new roads, as the automobile became available to most people. A metro began operating in 1977 between the new suburb of Bijlmermeer in the city's Zuidoost (southeast) exclave and the centre of Amsterdam. Further plans were to build a new highway above the metro to connect Amsterdam Centraal and the city centre with other parts of the city.

The required large-scale demolitions began in Amsterdam's former Jewish neighborhood. Smaller streets, such as the Jodenbreestraat and Weesperstraat, were widened and almost all houses and buildings were demolished. At the peak of the demolition, the Nieuwmarktrellen (Nieuwmarkt riots) broke out; the rioters expressed their fury about the demolition caused by the restructuring of the city.

As a result, the demolition was stopped and the highway into the city's centre was never fully built; only the metro was completed. Only a few streets remained widened. The new city hall was built on the almost completely demolished Waterlooplein. Meanwhile, large private organizations, such as Stadsherstel Amsterdam, were founded to restore the entire city centre. Although the success of this struggle is visible today, efforts for further restoration are still ongoing. The entire city centre has reattained its former splendour and, as a whole, is now a protected area. Many of its buildings have become monuments, and in July 2010 the Grachtengordel (the three concentric canals: Herengracht, Keizersgracht, and Prinsengracht) was added to the UNESCO World Heritage List.

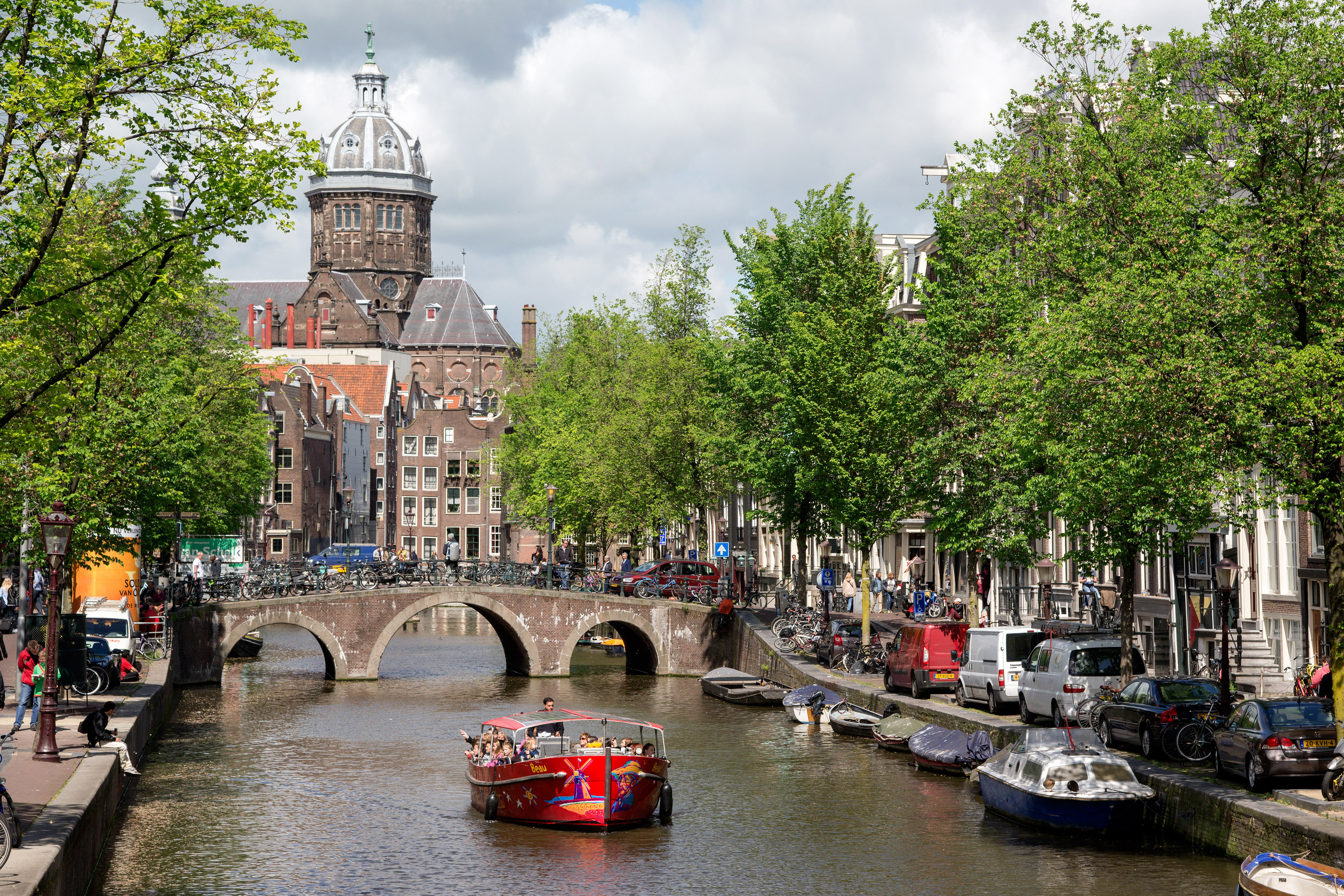
The 17th-century Canals of Amsterdam were listed as UNESCO World Heritage Sites in 2010, contributing to Amsterdam's fame as the "Venice of the North". Along with De Wallen, the canals are the focal point for tourists in the city.

In the 21st century, the Amsterdam city centre has attracted large numbers of tourists: between 2012 and 2015, the annual number of visitors rose from 10 to 17 million. Real estate prices have surged, and local shops are making way for tourist-oriented ones, making the centre unaffordable for the city's inhabitants. These developments have evoked comparisons with Venice, a city thought to be overwhelmed by the tourist influx.

Construction of a new metro line connecting the part of the city north of the IJ to its southern part was started in 2003. The project was controversial because its cost had exceeded its budget by a factor of three by 2008, because of fears of damage to buildings in the centre, and because construction had to be halted and restarted multiple times. The new metro line was completed in 2018.

Since 2014, renewed focus has been given to urban regeneration and renewal, especially in areas directly bordering the city centre, such as Frederik Hendrikbuurt. This urban renewal and expansion of the traditional centre of the city—with the construction of artificial islands of the new eastern IJburg neighbourhood—is part of the Structural Vision Amsterdam 2040 initiative.

== Geography ==
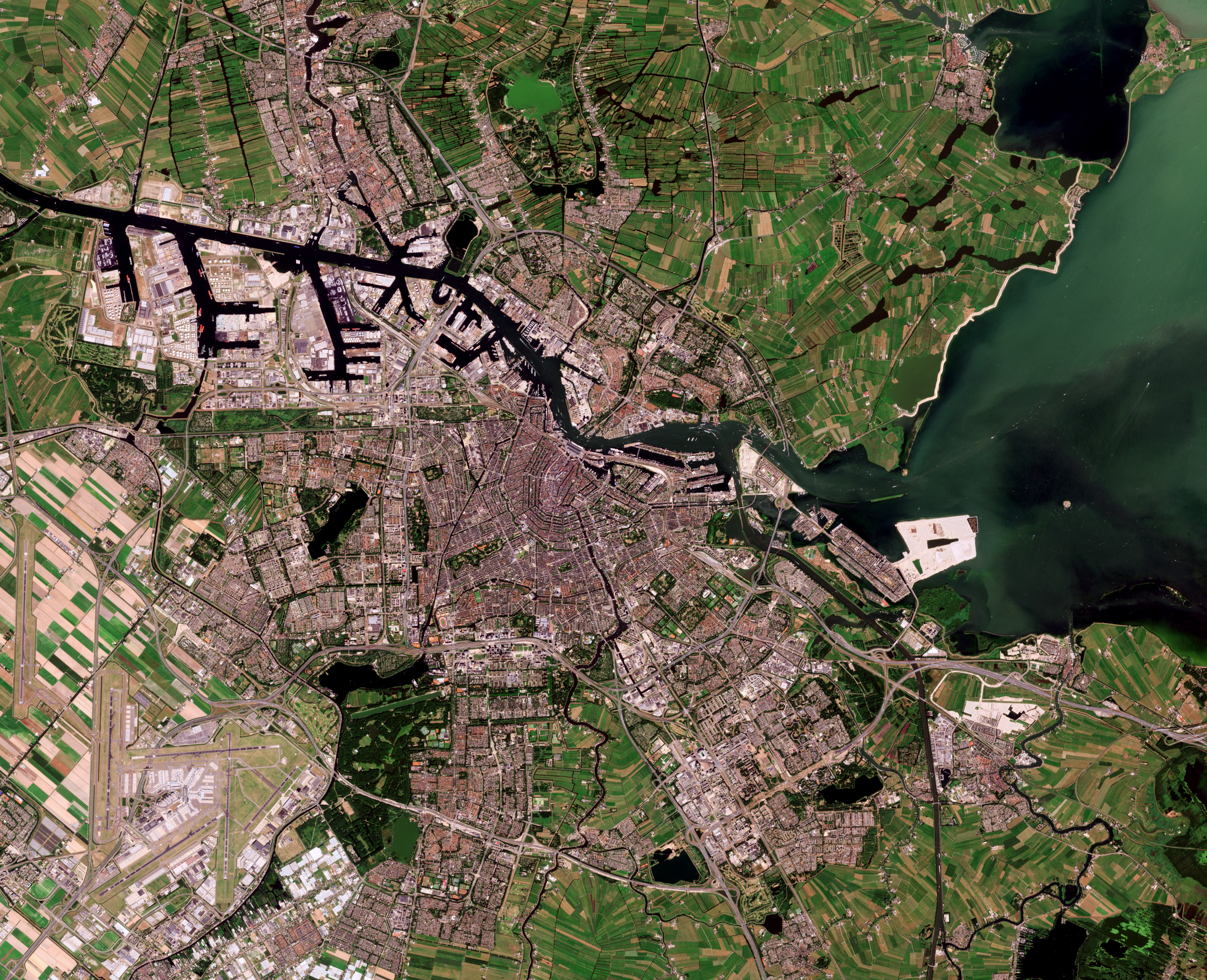
Satellite photo of Amsterdam, 2020

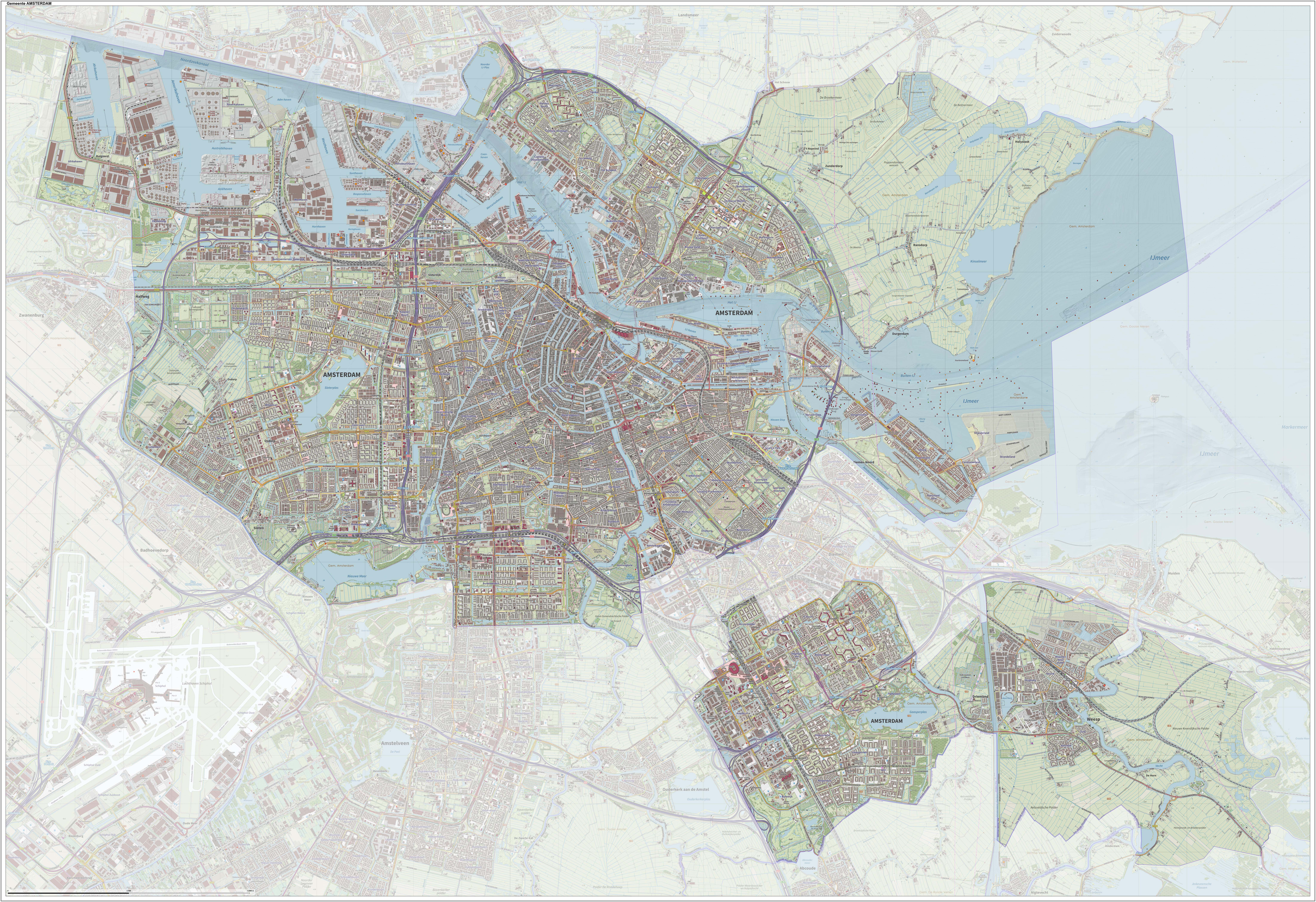
Topographic map of Amsterdam

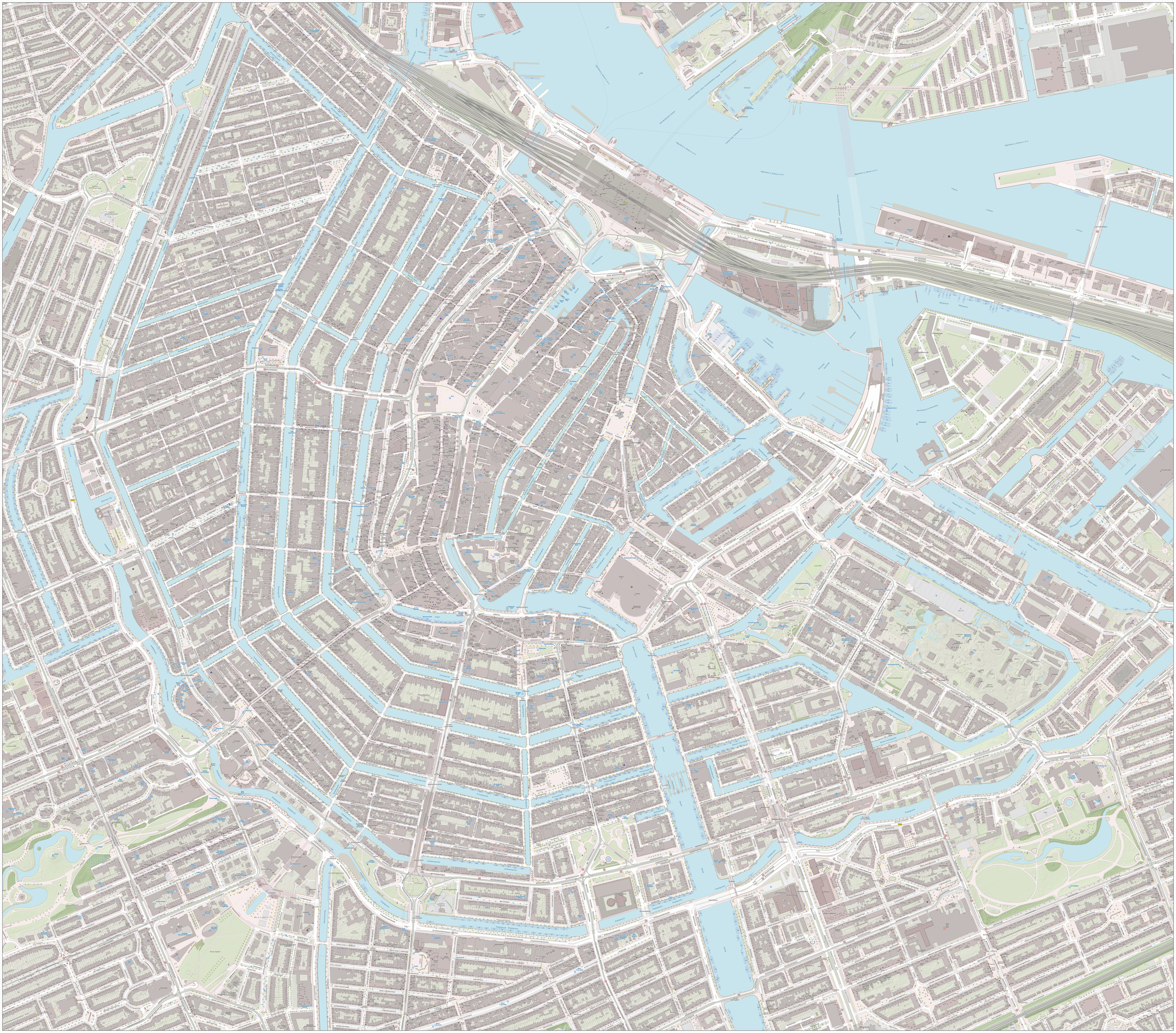
Large-scale map of the city centre of Amsterdam, including sightseeing markers, as of April 2017

Amsterdam is located in the Western Netherlands, in the province of North Holland, the capital of which is not Amsterdam, but rather Haarlem. The river Amstel ends in the city centre and connects to a large number of canals that eventually terminate in the IJ. Amsterdam's elevation is about −2 m (−6.6 ft) below sea level. The surrounding land is flat as it is formed of large polders. An artificial forest, Amsterdamse Bos, is in the southwest. Amsterdam is connected to the North Sea by the North Sea Canal.

Amsterdam is intensely urbanised, as is the Metropolitan Region Amsterdam surrounding the city. Comprising 219.4 km^{2} (84.7 sq mi) of land, the city proper has 4,457 inhabitants per km^{2} and 2,275 houses per km^{2}. Parks and nature reserves make up 12% of Amsterdam's land area.

=== Water ===
Amsterdam has more than 100 km (60 mi) of canals, most of which are navigable by boat. The city's three main canals are the Prinsengracht, the Herengracht, and the Keizersgracht.

In the Middle Ages, Amsterdam was surrounded by a moat, called the Singel, which now forms the innermost ring in the city, and gives the city centre a horseshoe shape. The city is also served by a seaport. It has been compared with Venice, due to its division into about 90 islands, which are linked by more than 1,200 bridges.

=== Climate ===
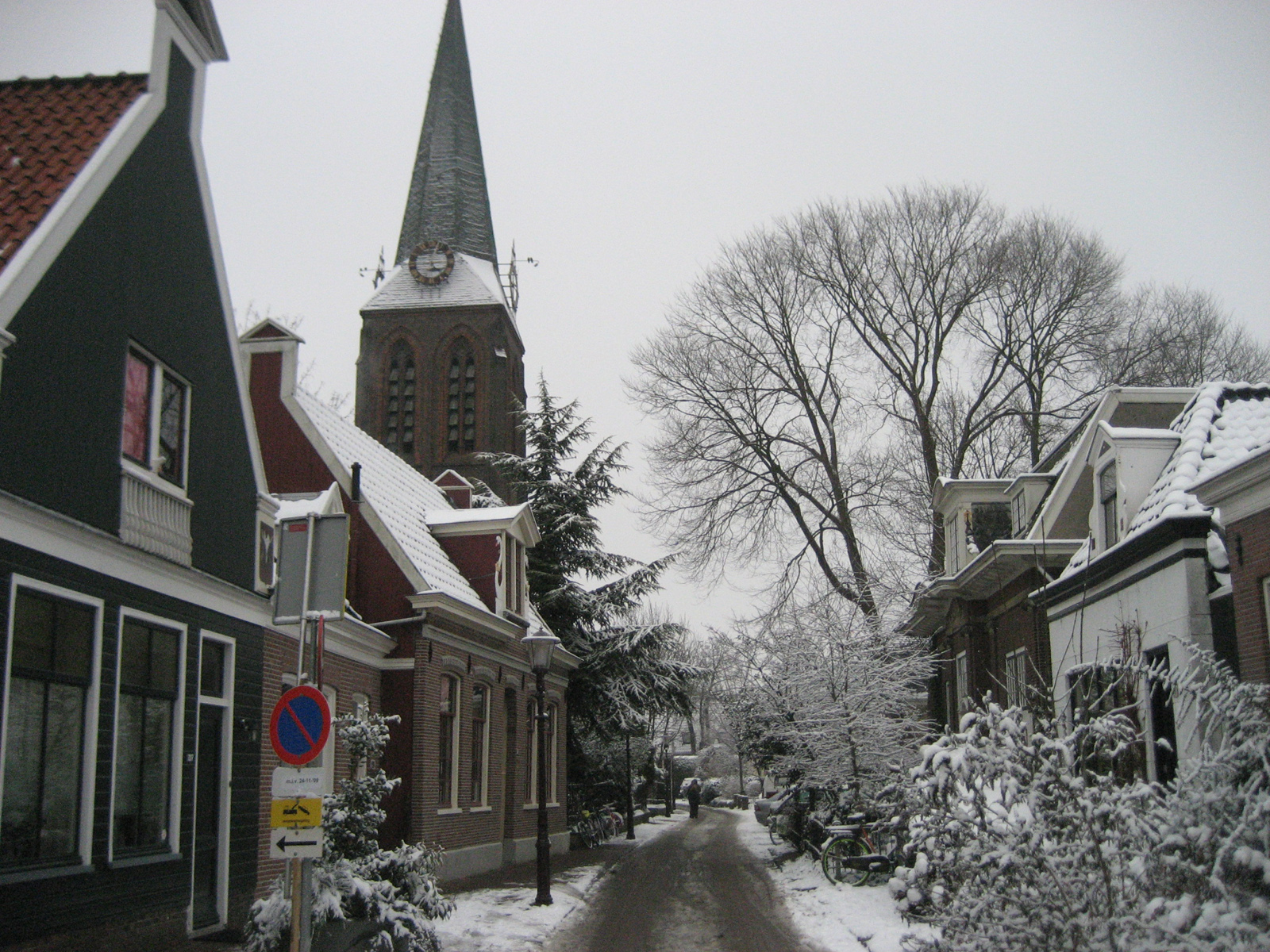
Nieuwendammerdijk en Buiksloterdijk, Amsterdam-Noord, winter 2010

Amsterdam has an oceanic climate (Köppen: Cfb) strongly influenced by its proximity to the North Sea to the west, with prevailing westerly winds.

Amsterdam, as well as most of the North Holland province, lies in USDA Hardiness zone 8b. Frosts mainly occur during spells of easterly or northeasterly winds from the inner European continent. Even then, because Amsterdam is surrounded on three sides by large bodies of water, as well as having a significant heat-island effect, nights rarely fall below −5 °C (23 °F), while it could easily be −12 °C (10 °F) in Hilversum, 25 km (16 mi) southeast.

Summers are moderately warm with several hot and humid days with occasional rain every month. The average daily high in August is 22.1 °C (72 °F), and 30 °C (86 °F) or higher is only measured on average on 2.5 days, placing Amsterdam in AHS Heat Zone 2. The record extremes range from −19.7 °C (−3.5 °F) to 36.3 °C (97.3 °F). Days with more than 1 mm (0.04 in) of precipitation are common, on average 133 days per year.

Amsterdam's average annual precipitation is 838 mm (33 in). A large part of this precipitation falls as light rain or brief showers. Cloudy and damp days are common during the cooler months of October through March.

Climate data for Amsterdam - Schiphol (AMS), elevation: −4 m (−13 ft) (1991-2020 normals, extremes 1949-present)
Month	Jan	Feb	Mar	Apr	May	Jun	Jul	Aug	Sep	Oct	Nov	Dec	Year
Record high °C (°F)	14.6 (58.3)	18.6 (65.5)	24.1 (75.4)	28.0 (82.4)	31.5 (88.7)	36.1 (97.0)	36.4 (97.5)	34.5 (94.1)	32.8 (91.0)	25.6 (78.1)	18.9 (66.0)	15.5 (59.9)	36.4 (97.5)
Mean daily maximum °C (°F)	6.2 (43.2)	6.9 (44.4)	10.1 (50.2)	14.3 (57.7)	17.8 (64.0)	20.3 (68.5)	22.5 (72.5)	22.4 (72.3)	19.2 (66.6)	14.7 (58.5)	10.0 (50.0)	6.9 (44.4)	14.3 (57.7)
Daily mean °C (°F)	3.8 (38.8)	4.1 (39.4)	6.5 (43.7)	9.8 (49.6)	13.3 (55.9)	16.0 (60.8)	18.1 (64.6)	18.0 (64.4)	15.1 (59.2)	11.3 (52.3)	7.4 (45.3)	4.6 (40.3)	10.7 (51.3)
Mean daily minimum °C (°F)	1.2 (34.2)	1.0 (33.8)	2.8 (37.0)	5.2 (41.4)	8.6 (47.5)	11.3 (52.3)	13.5 (56.3)	13.4 (56.1)	11.0 (51.8)	7.7 (45.9)	4.5 (40.1)	1.5 (34.7)	6.8 (44.2)
Record low °C (°F)	−16.3 (2.7)	−19.7 (−3.5)	−16.7 (1.9)	−4.7 (23.5)	−1.1 (30.0)	1.7 (35.1)	5.0 (41.0)	5.0 (41.0)	2.0 (35.6)	−3.4 (25.9)	−8.1 (17.4)	−14.8 (5.4)	−19.7 (−3.5)
Average precipitation mm (inches)	66.5 (2.62)	54.7 (2.15)	51.8 (2.04)	39.6 (1.56)	53.9 (2.12)	64.8 (2.55)	82.3 (3.24)	98.6 (3.88)	84.4 (3.32)	86.7 (3.41)	85.3 (3.36)	81.7 (3.22)	850.3 (33.48)
Average precipitation days (≥ 1.0 mm)	12.2	10.8	9.7	8.6	8.9	9.7	10.9	11.6	10.9	12.4	13.4	14.1	133.2
Average snowy days	4.8	5.3	2.8	0.2	0.0	0.0	0.0	0.0	0.0	0.1	0.8	3.9	17.9
Average relative humidity (%)	87.3	84.9	81.0	75.6	74.5	76.3	77.2	78.3	81.8	84.9	88.4	88.5	81.6
Average dew point °C (°F)	1.9 (35.4)	1.8 (35.2)	3.5 (38.3)	5.7 (42.3)	8.9 (48.0)	11.8 (53.2)	14.0 (57.2)	14.2 (57.6)	12.0 (53.6)	8.9 (48.0)	5.6 (42.1)	2.9 (37.2)	7.7 (45.9)
Mean monthly sunshine hours	69.0	94.3	146.0	197.7	230.7	217.2	225.4	203.5	154.2	116.9	66.8	58.2	1,779.9
Source 1: Royal Netherlands Meteorological Institute
Source 2: Servizio Meteorologico (extremes)

== Demographics ==
Amsterdam population pyramid in 2022

=== Historical population ===
Estimated population, 1300–1564

Year	Pop.	±% p.a.
1300	1,000	—
1400	4,700	+1.56%
1514	11,000	+0.75%

Year	Pop.	±% p.a.
1546	13,200	+0.57%
1557	22,200	+4.84%
1564	30,900	+4.84%

Source: Bureau Monumentenzorg en Archeologie (1300)
Ramaer 1921, pp. 11–12, 181 (1400 and 1564)
Van Dillen 1929, pp. xxv–xxvi (1514, 1546 and 1557)

In 1300, Amsterdam's population was around 1,000 people. While many towns in Holland experienced population decline during the 15th and 16th centuries, Amsterdam's population grew, mainly due to the rise of the profitable Baltic maritime trade especially in grain after the Burgundian victory in the Dutch–Hanseatic War in 1441. The population of Amsterdam was only modest compared to the towns and cities of Flanders and Brabant, which comprised the most urbanized area of the Low Countries.

Historical population in 10-year intervals, 1590–present

Year	Pop.	±%
1590	41,362	—
1600	59,551	+44.0%
1610	82,742	+38.9%
1620	106,500	+28.7%
1630	135,439	+27.2%
1640	162,388	+19.9%
1650	176,873	+8.9%
1660	192,767	+9.0%
1670	206,188	+7.0%
1680	219,098	+6.3%
1690	224,393	+2.4%
1700	235,224	+4.8%
1710	239,149	+1.7%
1720	241,447	+1.0%
1730	239,866	−0.7%
1740	237,582	−1.0%
1750	233,952	−1.5%
1760	240,862	+3.0%
1770	239,056	−0.7%
1780	228,938	−4.2%
1790	214,473	−6.3%
1800	203,485	−5.1%

Year	Pop.	±%
1810	201,347	−1.1%
1820	197,831	−1.7%
1830	206,383	+4.3%
1840	214,367	+3.9%
1850	223,700	+4.4%
1860	244,050	+9.1%
1870	279,221	+14.4%
1880	323,784	+16.0%
1890	417,539	+29.0%
1900	520,602	+24.7%
1910	573,983	+10.3%
1920	647,427	+12.8%
1930	757,386	+17.0%
1940	800,594	+5.7%
1950	835,834	+4.4%
1960	869,602	+4.0%
1970	831,463	−4.4%
1980	716,967	−13.8%
1990	695,221	−3.0%
2000	731,289	+5.2%
2010	767,773	+5.0%
2020	872,380	+13.6%

Source: Nusteling 1985, p. 240 (1590–1670)
Van Leeuwen & Oeppen 1993, p. 87 (1680–1880)
Department for Research, Information and Statistics (1890–present)

This changed when, during the Dutch Revolt, many people from the Southern Netherlands fled to the North, especially after Antwerp fell to Spanish forces in 1585. Jews from Spain, Portugal, and Eastern Europe similarly settled in Amsterdam, as did Germans and Scandinavians. In thirty years, Amsterdam's population more than doubled between 1585 and 1610. By 1600, its population was around 50,000. During the 1660s, Amsterdam's population reached 200,000. The city's growth levelled off and the population stabilized around 240,000 for most of the 18th century.

In 1750, Amsterdam was the fourth largest city in Western Europe, behind London (676,000), Paris (560,000) and Naples (324,000). This was all the more remarkable as Amsterdam was neither the capital city nor the seat of government of the Dutch Republic, which itself was a much smaller state than Great Britain, France or the Ottoman Empire. In contrast to those other metropolises, Amsterdam was also surrounded by large towns such as Leiden (about 67,000), Rotterdam (45,000), Haarlem (38,000), and Utrecht (30,000).

The city's population declined in the early 19th century, dipping under 200,000 in 1820. By the second half of the 19th century, industrialization spurred renewed growth. Amsterdam's population hit an all-time high of 872,000 in 1959, before declining in the following decades due to government-sponsored suburbanisation to so-called groeikernen (growth centres) such as Purmerend and Almere. Between 1970 and 1980, Amsterdam experienced a sharp population decline, peaking at a net loss of 25,000 people in 1973. By 1985 the city had only 675,570 residents. This was soon followed by reurbanization and gentrification, leading to renewed population growth in the 2010s. Also in the 2010s, much of Amsterdam's population growth was due to immigration to the city.

=== Immigration ===
In the 16th and 17th centuries, non-Dutch immigrants to Amsterdam were mostly Protestant Huguenots and Flemings, Sephardic Jews, and Westphalians. Huguenots came after the Edict of Fontainebleau in 1685, while the Flemish Protestants came during the Eighty Years' War against Catholic Spain. The Westphalians came to Amsterdam mostly for economic reasons; their influx continued through the 18th and 19th centuries. Before the Second World War, 10% of the city population was Jewish. Just twenty percent of them survived the Holocaust.

Amsterdam experienced an influx of religions and cultures after the Second World War. With 180 different nationalities, Amsterdam is home to one of the widest varieties of nationalities of any city in the world. The proportion of the population of immigrant origin in the city proper is about 50% and 88% of the population are Dutch citizens.

The first mass immigration in the 20th century was by people from Indonesia, who came to Amsterdam after the independence of the Dutch East Indies in the 1940s and 1950s. In the 1960s guest workers from Turkey, Morocco, Italy, and Spain immigrated to Amsterdam. After the independence of Suriname in 1975, a large wave of Surinamese settled in Amsterdam, mostly in the Bijlmer area. Other immigrants, including refugees asylum seekers and undocumented immigrants, came from Europe, the Americas, Asia, and Africa.

Chinese immigration to Amsterdam began to develop in the early 20th century, particularly following the arrival of Chinese seafarers recruited by Dutch shipping companies in 1911. A small Chinatown subsequently emerged around the Binnen Bantammerstraat, Nieuwmarkt and Zeedijk. Alongside sailors originating mainly from Guangdong, the community also included substantial number of itinerant traders from Qingtian and Wenzhou in southern Zhejiang. Following the Second World War, Amsterdam's Chinese community expanded rapidly through migration from Hong Kong and other parts of the Chinese diaspora.

In the 1970s and 1980s, many 'old' Amsterdammers moved to 'new' cities like Almere and Purmerend, prompted by the third Land-use planning bill of the Dutch Government. This bill promoted suburbanization and arranged for new developments in so-called "groeikernen", literally cores of growth. Young professionals and artists moved into neighborhoods De Pijp and the Jordaan abandoned by these Amsterdammers. The non-Western immigrants settled mostly in the social housing projects in Amsterdam-West and the Bijlmer.

In 2006, people of non-Western origin made up approximately one-fifth of the population of Amsterdam, and more than 30% of the city's children. A slight majority of the residents of Amsterdam have at least one parent who was born outside the country. However, a much larger majority has at least one parent who was born inside the country (intercultural marriages are common in the city). Only a third of inhabitants under 15 are autochthons (person with two parents of Dutch origin). In 2023, autochthons were a minority in 40% of Amsterdam's neighborhoods. Segregation along ethnic lines is visible, with people of non-Western origin, considered a separate group by Statistics Netherlands, concentrating in specific neighborhoods especially in Nieuw-West, Zeeburg, Bijlmer and in certain areas of Amsterdam-Noord.

In 2000, Christians formed the largest religious group in the city (28% of the population). The next largest religion was Islam (8%), most of whose followers were Sunni. By 2015, this remained largely unchanged, with a slight decrease in the Muslim population to 7.1%. Amsterdam has been one of the municipalities in the Netherlands that provided immigrants with extensive and free Dutch-language courses, which have benefited many immigrants.

Origin
Background group	1996		2000		2005		2010		2015		2020		2024	
Background group	Numbers	%	Numbers	%	Numbers	%	Numbers	%	Numbers	%	Numbers	%	Numbers	%
Dutch natives	419,863	58.5%	406,727	55.6%	384,155	51.7%	384,480	50%	402,105	48.9%	387,775	44.43%	375,842	40.4%
Western migration background	94,955	13.2%	97 232	13.3%	104,452	14.1%	114,730	14.9%	134,524	16.4%	170 164	19.5%	–	–
Germany	18 475		17 451		17 070		17 099		17 688		19 374		21,179	
United Kingdom	7 817		7 927		9 315		9 841		11 463		15 338		17,028	
United States	4 015		4 785		5 891		6 540		7 872		11 582		14,696	
Italy	3 509		3 689		4 148		4 972		7 062		11 462		14,427	
France	3 038		3 456		4 058		4 945		6 379		9 316		11,972	
Non-Western migration background	203,301	28.3%	227 329	31.1%	254,176	34.2%	268,247	35%	285,123	34.7%	314,818	36.07%	–	–
Morocco	47 723		54 722		64 385		69 433		74 254		77,210	8.85%	79,157	
Suriname	69 095		71 218		70 380		68 938		66 638		64,218	7.36%	62 174	
Turkey	30 864		33 705		37 957		40 365		42 375		44,465	5.09%	46 820	
Indonesia	28 489		28 037		26 900		26 436		26 091		24,075	2.76%	23,242	
(Netherlands Antilles) Dutch Antilles and Aruba	10 003		11 122		11 500		11 707		12 141		12,174	1.39%	12 833	
Ghana	6 859		8 574		10 167		10 944		11 884		11 884		13 864	
Somalia	677		1 179		991		1 071		1 492		1 714		2 010	
Iraq	1 027		2 113		2 536		2 626		2 701		3 080		3 352	
Non-Dutch migration background	298,256	41.5%	324,561	44.4%	358,628	48.3%	382,977	50%	419,647	51.9%	484,982	55.6%	555,456	59.6%
Total	718,119	100%	731,288	100%	742,783	100%	767,457	100%	821,752	100%	872,757	100%	931,298	100%

=== Religion ===
Religion in Amsterdam (2015)
1. Non affiliated (62.2%)
2. Catholic Church (13.3%)
3. Protestant Church (9.80%)
4. Other Christian (5.80%)
5. Islam (7.10%)
6. Hinduism (1.10%)
7. Buddhism (1.00%)
8. Judaism (0.70%)

In 1578, the largely Catholic city of Amsterdam joined the revolt against Spanish rule, late in comparison to other major northern Dutch cities. Catholic priests were driven out of the city. Following the Dutch takeover, all churches were converted to Protestant worship. Calvinism was declared the main religion. It was forbidden to openly profess Roman Catholicism and the Catholic hierarchy was prohibited until the mid-19th century. This led to the establishment of clandestine churches, covert religious buildings hidden in pre-existing buildings. Catholics, some Jews, and dissenting Protestants worshipped in such buildings. A large influx of foreigners of many religions came to 17th-century Amsterdam, in particular Sephardic Jews from Spain and Portugal, Huguenots from France, Lutherans, Mennonites, as well as Protestants from across the Netherlands. This led to the establishment of many non-Dutch-speaking churches. In 1603, the Jewish received permission to practice their religion in the city. In 1639, the first synagogue was consecrated. The Jews came to call the town "Jerusalem of the West".

As they became established in the city, other Christian denominations used converted Catholic chapels to conduct their own services. The oldest English-language church congregation in the world outside the United Kingdom is found at the Begijnhof. Regular services there are still offered in English under the auspices of the Church of Scotland. Being Calvinists, the Huguenots soon integrated into the Dutch Reformed Church, though often retaining their own congregations. Some, commonly referred to by the moniker 'Walloon', are recognizable today as they offer occasional services in French.

In the second half of the 17th century, Amsterdam experienced an influx of Ashkenazim, Jews from Central and Eastern Europe. Jews often fled the pogroms in those areas. The first Ashkenazis who arrived in Amsterdam were refugees from the Khmelnytsky uprising occurring in Ukraine and the Thirty Years' War, which devastated much of Central Europe. They not only founded their own synagogues but had a strong influence on the 'Amsterdam dialect' adding a large Yiddish local vocabulary. Despite an absence of an official Jewish ghetto, most Jews preferred to live in the eastern part, which used to be the centre of medieval Amsterdam. The main street of this Jewish neighbourhood was Jodenbreestraat. The neighbourhood comprised the Waterlooplein and the Nieuwmarkt. Buildings in this neighbourhood fell into disrepair after the Second World War a large section of the neighbourhood was demolished during the construction of the metro system. This led to riots, and as a result, the original plans for large-scale reconstruction were abandoned by the government. The neighbourhood was rebuilt with smaller-scale residence buildings based on its original layout.

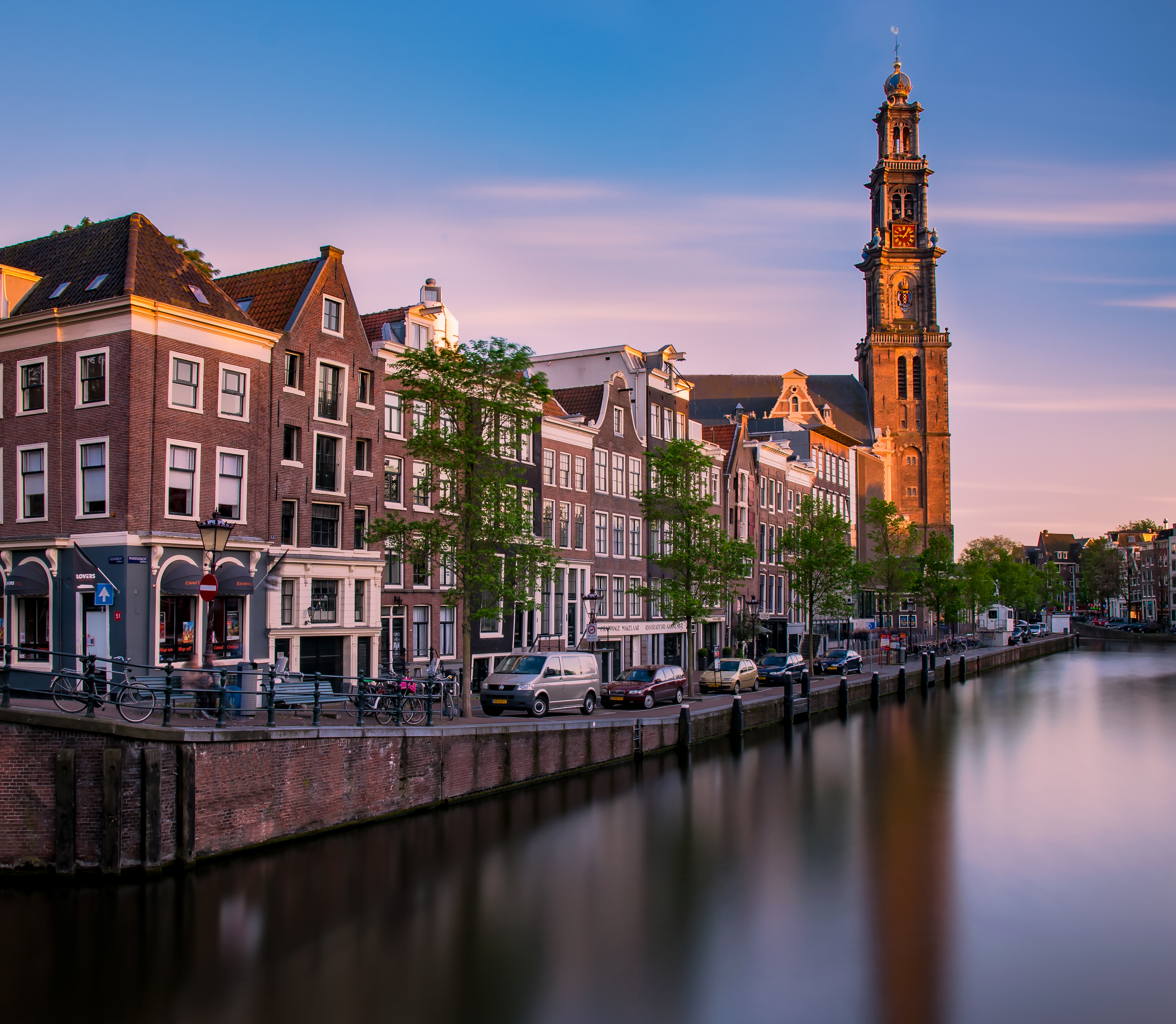
The Westerkerk in the Centrum borough, one of Amsterdam's best-known churches

Catholic churches in Amsterdam have been constructed since the restoration of the episcopal hierarchy in 1853. One of the principal architects behind the city's Catholic churches, Cuypers, was also responsible for the Amsterdam Centraal station and the Rijksmuseum.

In 1924, the Catholic Church hosted the International Eucharistic Congress in Amsterdam; numerous Catholic prelates visited the city, where festivities were held in churches and stadiums. Catholic processions on the public streets, however, were still forbidden under law at the time. Only in the 20th century was Amsterdam's relation to Catholicism normalised, but despite its far larger population size, the episcopal see of the city was placed in the provincial town of Haarlem.

Historically, Amsterdam has been predominantly Christian. In 1900 about 70% of the city's population was Christian; the largest religious denomination was the Dutch Reformed Church, adhered to by about 45% of residents, while members of the Catholic Church formed 25%. In recent times, the city's religious demography has diversified due to immigration from former colonies. Hinduism has been introduced by immigrants from Suriname and several distinct branches of Islam have been brought from various parts of the world. Islam is now the largest non-Christian religion in Amsterdam. The large community of Ghanaian immigrants has established African churches, often in parking garages in the Bijlmer area.

== Cityscape and architecture ==
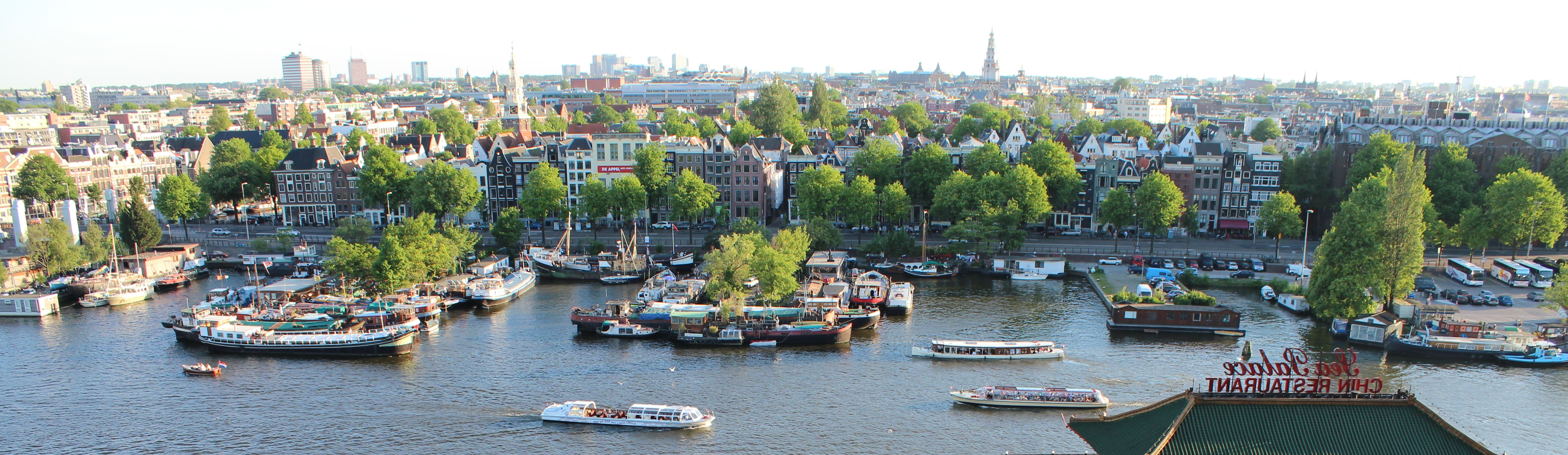
View of the city centre looking southwest from the Oosterdokskade

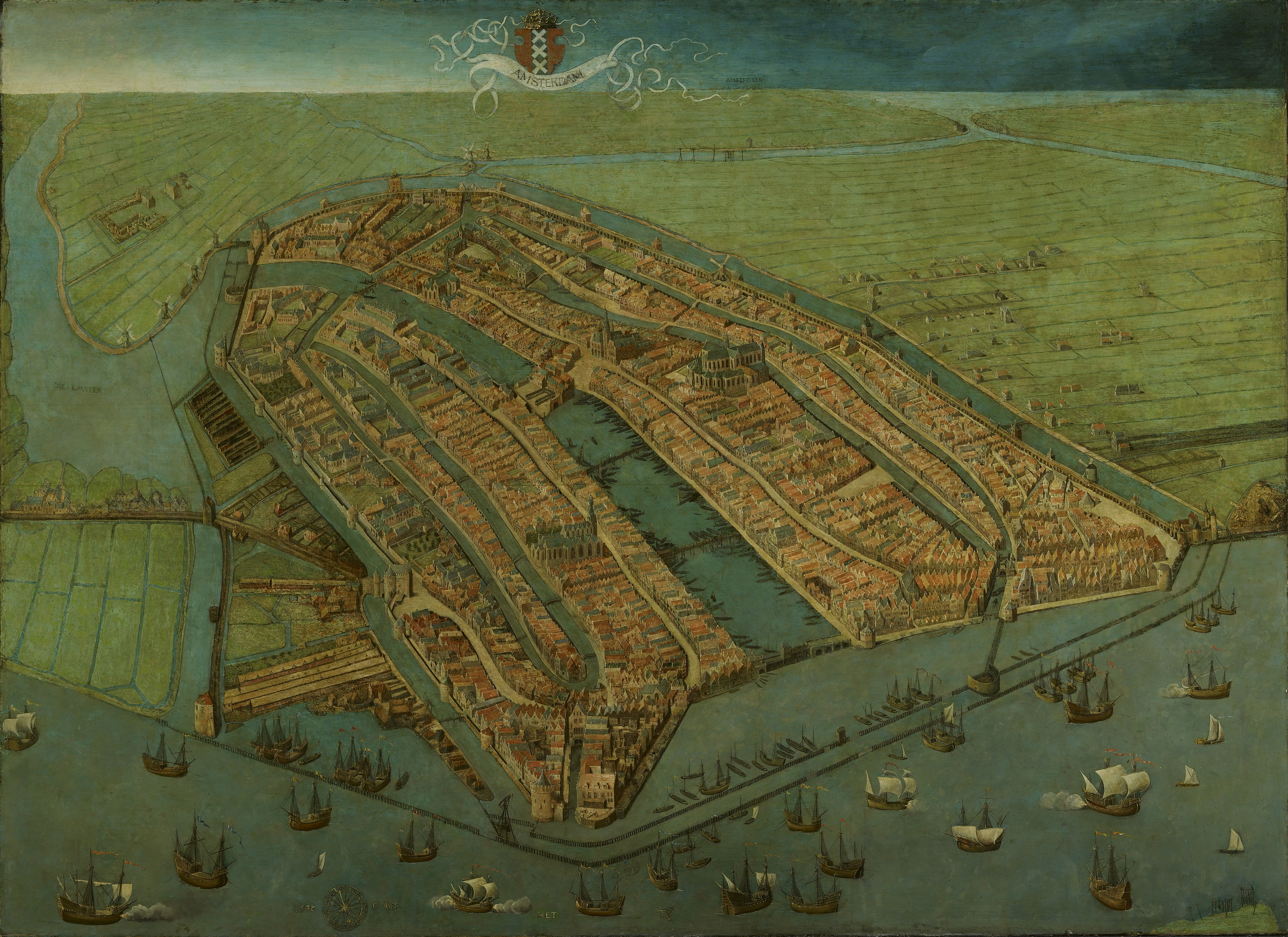
A 1538 painting by Cornelis Anthonisz showing a bird's-eye view of Amsterdam. The famous Grachtengordel had not yet been established.

Amsterdam fans out south from the Amsterdam Centraal station and Damrak, the main street off the station. The oldest area of the town is known as De Wallen (English: "The Quays"). It lies to the east of Damrak and contains the city's famous red-light district. To the south of De Wallen is the old Jewish quarter of Waterlooplein.

The medieval and colonial age canals of Amsterdam, known as grachten, embraces the heart of the city where homes have interesting gables. Beyond the Grachtengordel are the former working-class areas of Jordaan and de Pijp. The Museumplein with the city's major museums, the Vondelpark, a 19th-century park named after the Dutch writer Joost van den Vondel, as well as the Plantage neighbourhood, with the zoo, are also located outside the Grachtengordel.

Several parts of the city and the surrounding urban area are polders. This can be recognised by the suffix -meer which means lake, as in Aalsmeer, Bijlmermeer, Haarlemmermeer and Watergraafsmeer.

=== Canals ===
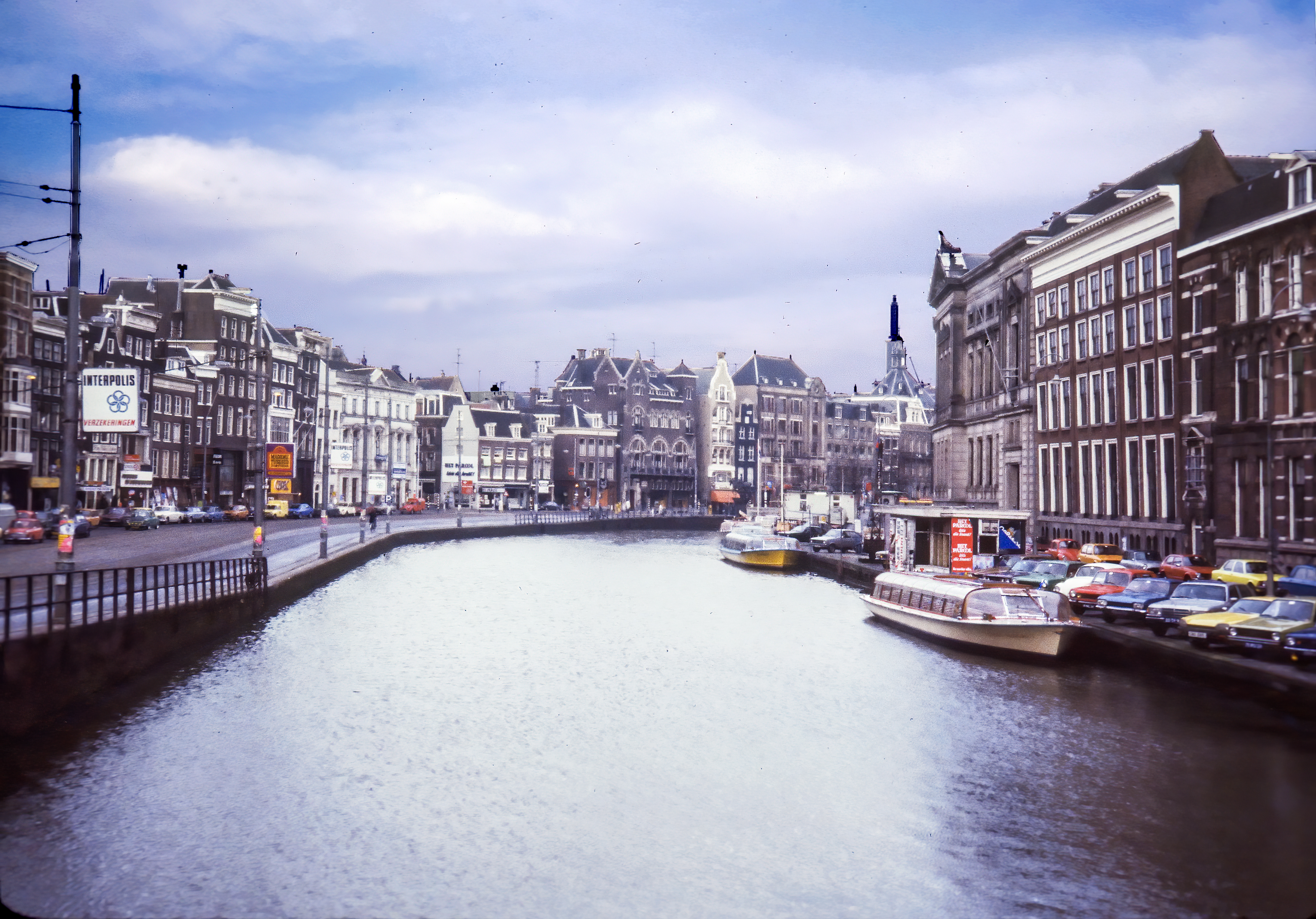
Rokin – November 1977

The Amsterdam canal system is the result of conscious city planning. In the early 17th century, when immigration was at a peak, a comprehensive plan was developed that was based on four concentric half-circles of canals with their ends emerging at the IJ bay. Known as the Grachtengordel, three of the canals were mostly for residential development: the Herengracht (where "Heren" refers to Heren Regeerders van de stad Amsterdam, ruling lords of Amsterdam, while gracht means canal, so that the name can be roughly translated as "Canal of the Lords"), Keizersgracht (Emperor's Canal) and Prinsengracht (Prince's Canal). The fourth and outermost canal is the Singelgracht, which is often not mentioned on maps because it is a collective name for all canals in the outer ring. The Singelgracht should not be confused with the oldest and innermost canal, the Singel.

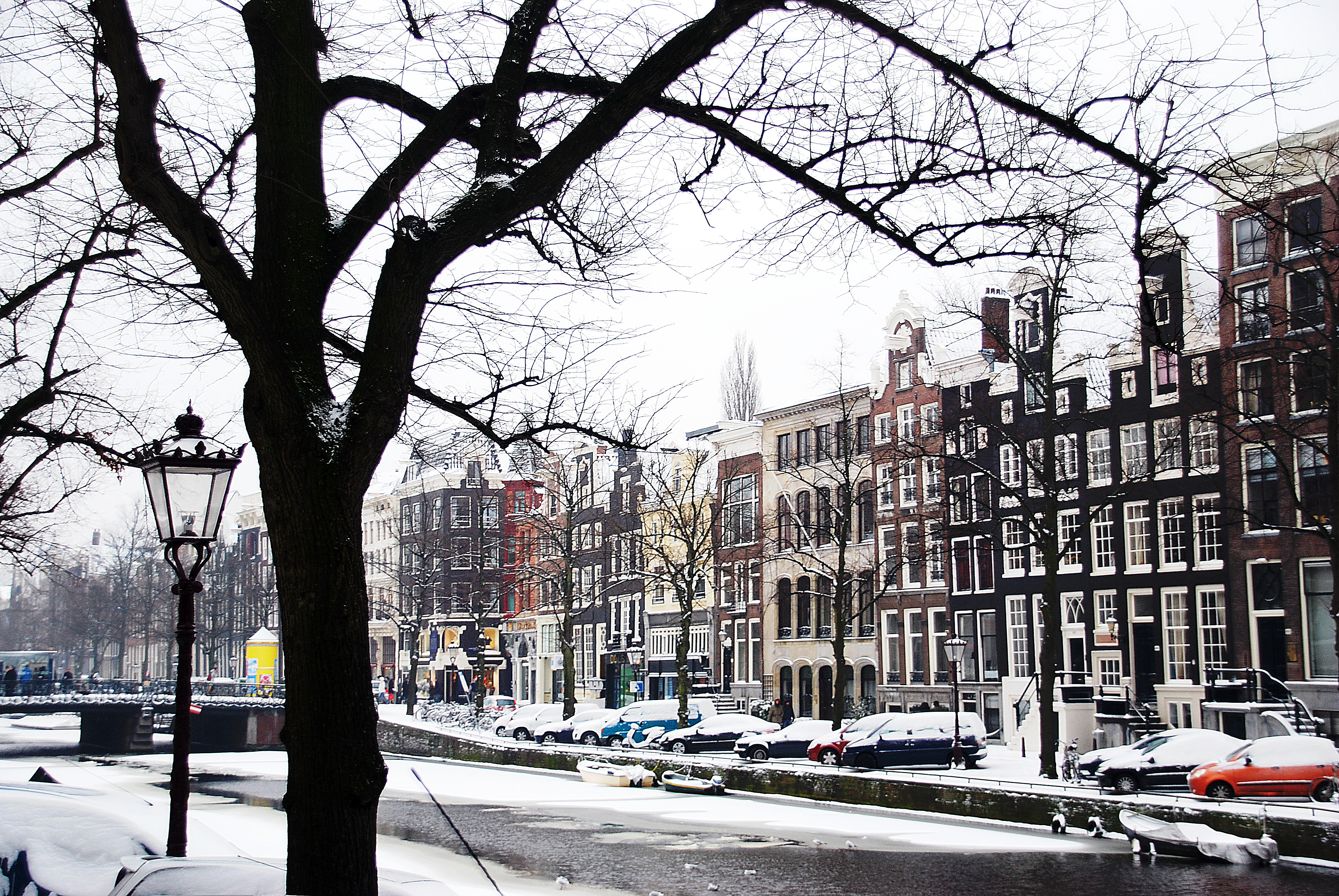
Herengracht

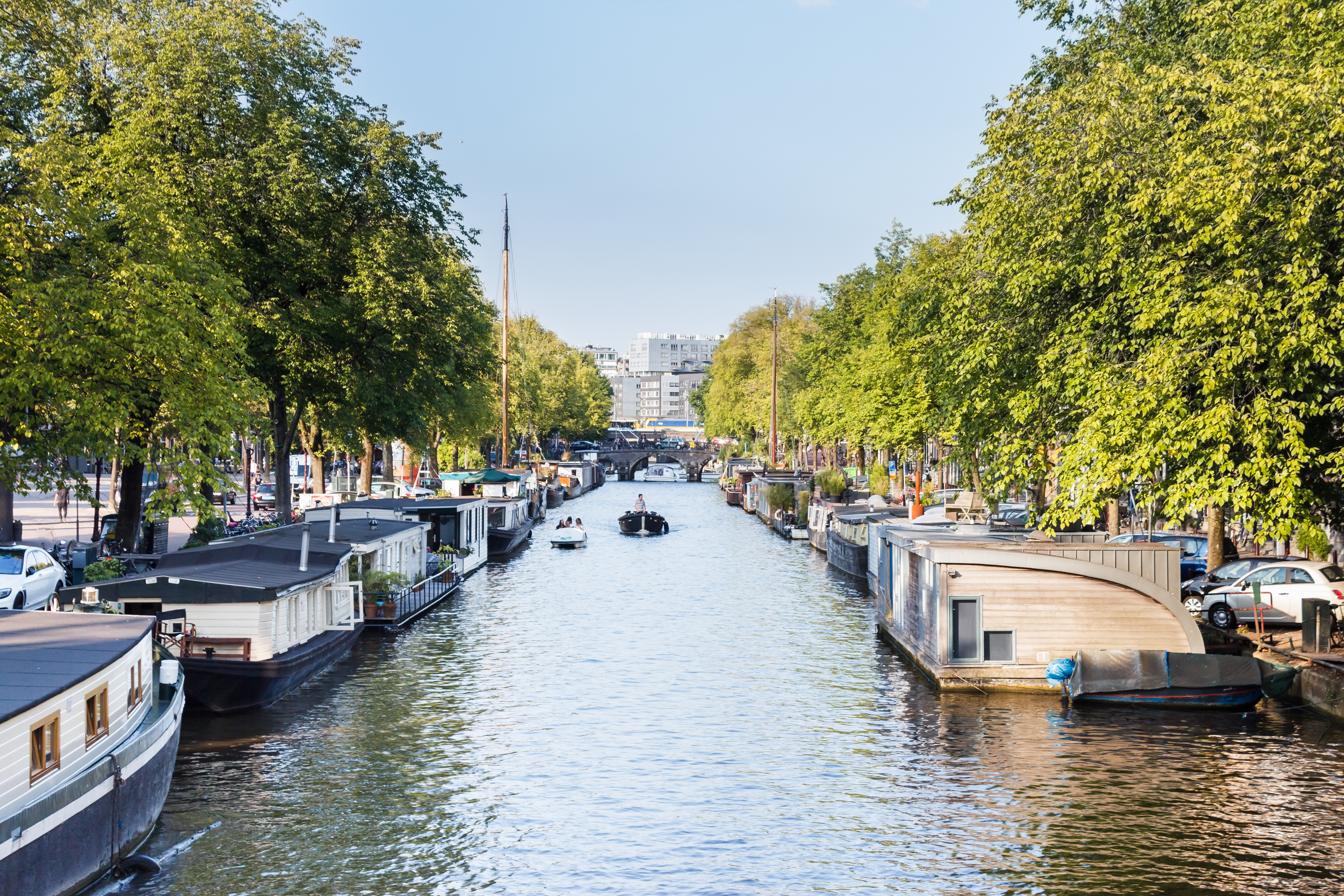
Prinsengracht

The canals served for defense, water management and transport. The defenses took the form of a moat and earthen dikes, with gates at transit points, but otherwise no masonry superstructures. The original plans have been lost, so historians, such as Ed Taverne, need to speculate on the original intentions: it is thought that the considerations of the layout were purely practical and defensive rather than ornamental.

Construction started in 1613 and proceeded from west to east, across the breadth of the layout, like a gigantic windshield wiper as the historian Geert Mak calls it – and not from the centre outwards, as a popular myth has it. The canal construction in the southern sector was completed by 1656. Subsequently, the construction of residential buildings proceeded slowly. The eastern part of the concentric canal plan, covering the area between the Amstel River and the IJ Bay, has never been implemented. In the following centuries, the land was used for parks, senior citizens' homes, theatres, other public facilities, and waterways without much planning. Over the years, several canals have been filled in, becoming streets or squares, such as the Nieuwezijds Voorburgwal and the Spui.

=== Expansion ===
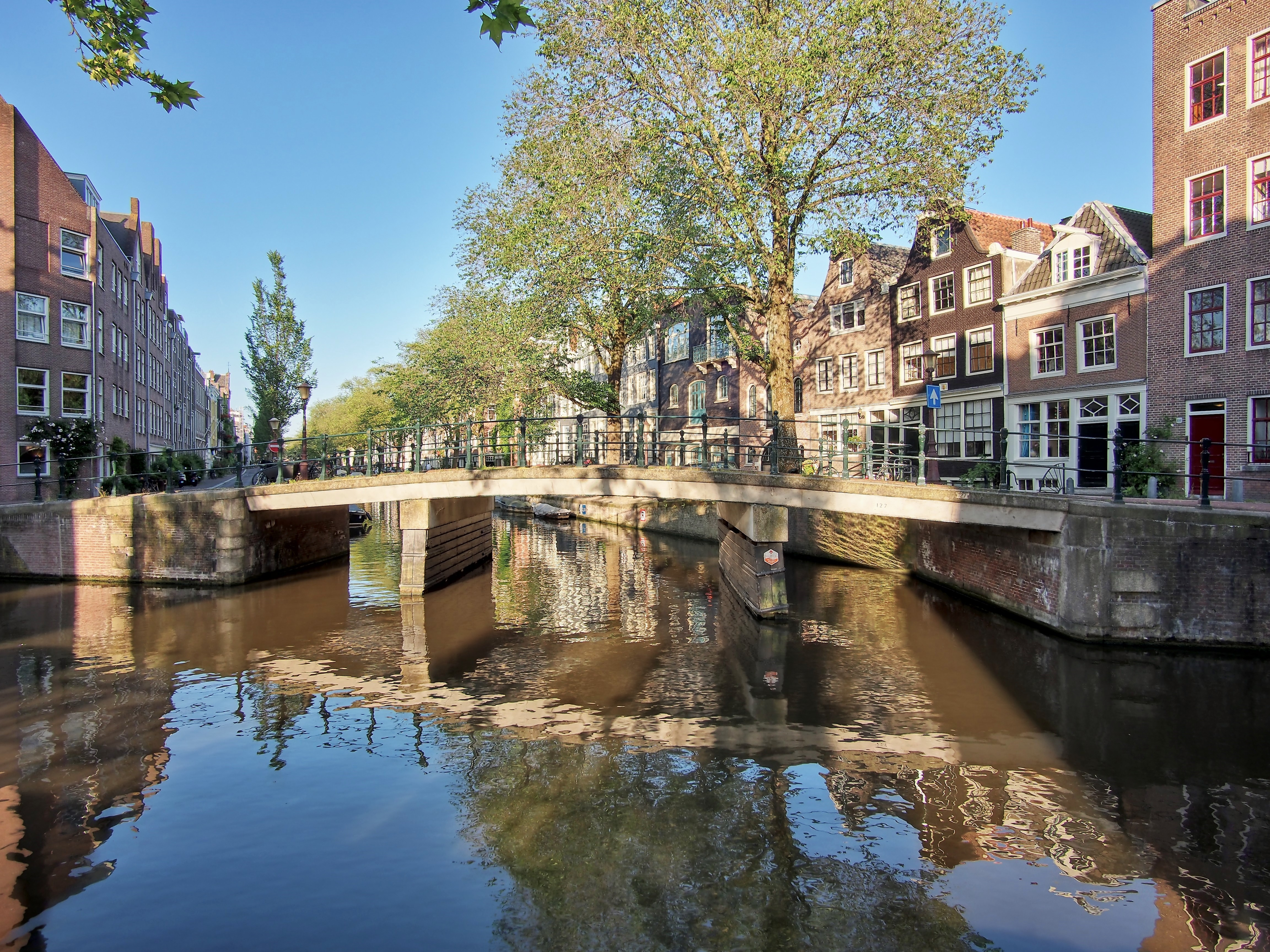
The Egelantiersgracht lies west of the Grachtengordel, in the Jordaan neighbourhood.

After the development of Amsterdam's canals in the 17th century, the city did not grow beyond its borders for two centuries. During the 19th century, Samuel Sarphati devised a plan based on the grandeur of Paris and London at that time. The plan envisaged the construction of new houses, public buildings, and streets just outside the Grachtengordel. The main aim of the plan, however, was to improve public health. Although the plan did not expand the city, it did produce some of the largest public buildings to date, like the Paleis voor Volksvlijt.

Following Sarphati, civil engineers Jacobus van Niftrik and Jan Kalff designed an entire ring of 19th-century neighbourhoods surrounding the city's centre, with the city preserving the ownership of all land outside the 17th-century limit, thus firmly controlling development. Most of these neighbourhoods became home to the working class.

In response to overcrowding, two plans were designed at the beginning of the 20th century which were very different from anything Amsterdam had ever seen before: Plan Zuid (designed by the architect Berlage) and West. These plans involved the development of new neighbourhoods consisting of housing blocks for all social classes.

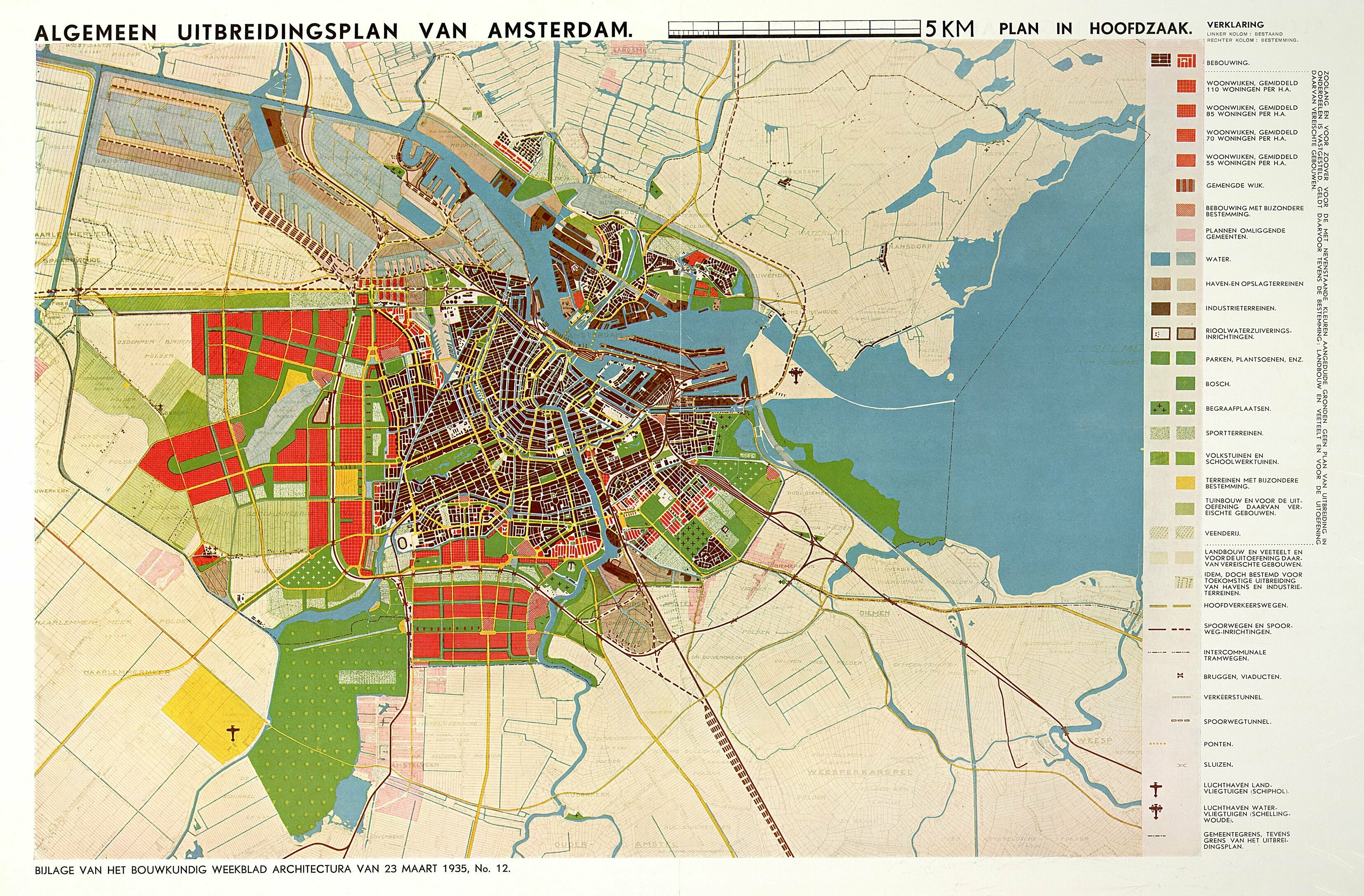
The 1935 General Extension Plan of Amsterdam (AUP), which guided the post-war development of the western garden suburbs and Buitenveldert.

After the Second World War, large new neighbourhoods were built in the western, southeastern, and northern parts of the city. These new neighbourhoods were built to relieve the city's shortage of living space and give people affordable houses with modern conveniences. The neighbourhoods consisted mainly of large housing blocks located among green spaces, connected to wide roads, making the neighbourhoods accessible by motor car. On the city's southern edge, Buitenveldert was developed from the late 1950s as a garden suburb under Amsterdam's 1935 General Extension Plan, with an open layout, varied building heights and extensive green space. The western suburbs which were built in that period are collectively called the Westelijke Tuinsteden. The area to the southeast of the city built during the same period is known as the Bijlmer.

=== Architecture ===
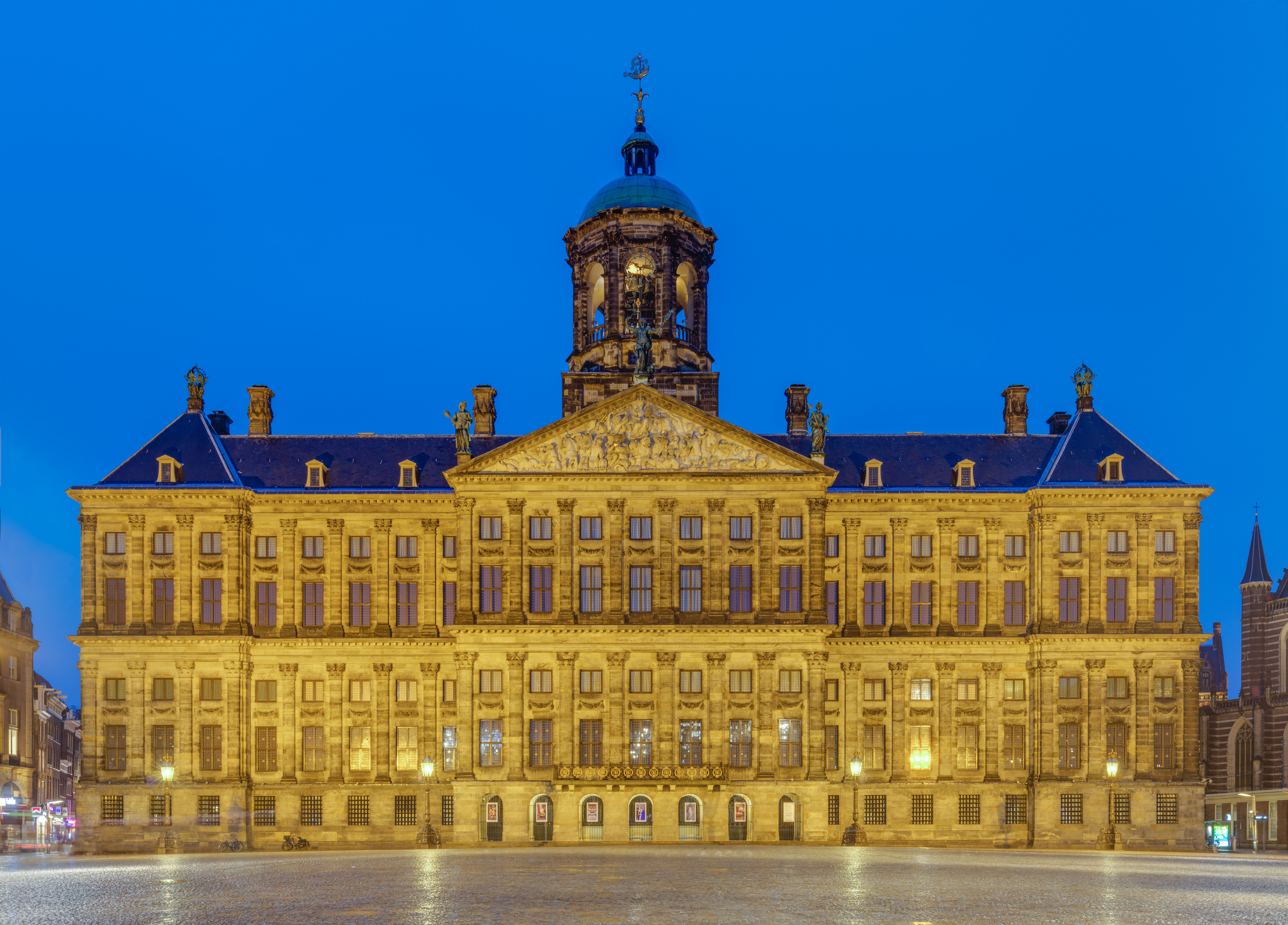
The Royal Palace of Amsterdam, by architects Jacob van Campen and Daniël Stalpaert, is characteristic of the architecture of the Dutch Baroque architecture.

Amsterdam has a rich architectural history. The oldest building in Amsterdam is the Oude Kerk (English: Old Church), at the heart of the Wallen, consecrated in 1306. The oldest wooden building is Het Houten Huys at the Begijnhof. It was constructed around 1425 and is one of only two existing wooden buildings. It is also one of the few examples of Gothic architecture in Amsterdam. The oldest stone building in the Netherlands, The Moriaan is built in 's-Hertogenbosch.

In the 16th century, wooden buildings were razed and replaced with brick ones. During this period, many buildings were constructed in the architectural style of the Renaissance. Buildings of this period are very recognisable with their stepped gable façades, which is the common Dutch Renaissance style. Amsterdam quickly developed its own Renaissance architecture. These buildings were built according to the principles of the architect Hendrick de Keyser. One of the most striking buildings designed by Hendrick de Keyser is the Westerkerk. In the 17th century baroque architecture became very popular, as it was elsewhere in Europe. This roughly coincided with Amsterdam's Golden Age. The leading architects of this style in Amsterdam were Jacob van Campen, Philips Vingboons and Daniel Stalpaert.

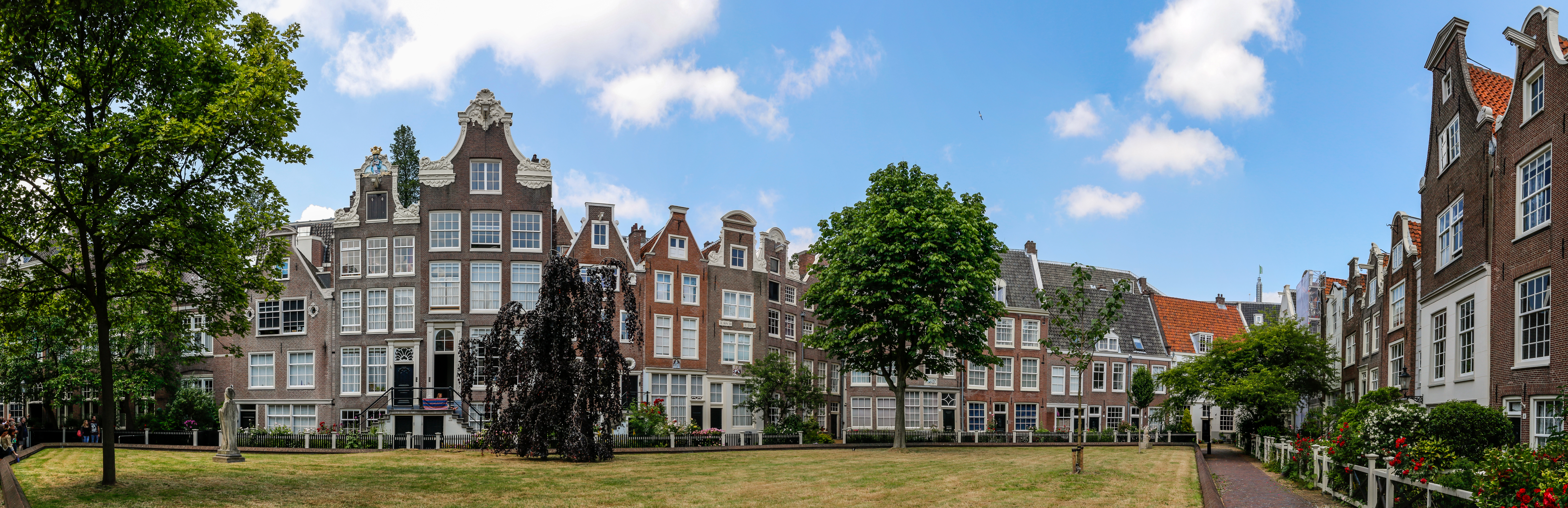
The Begijnhof is one of the oldest hofjes in Amsterdam.

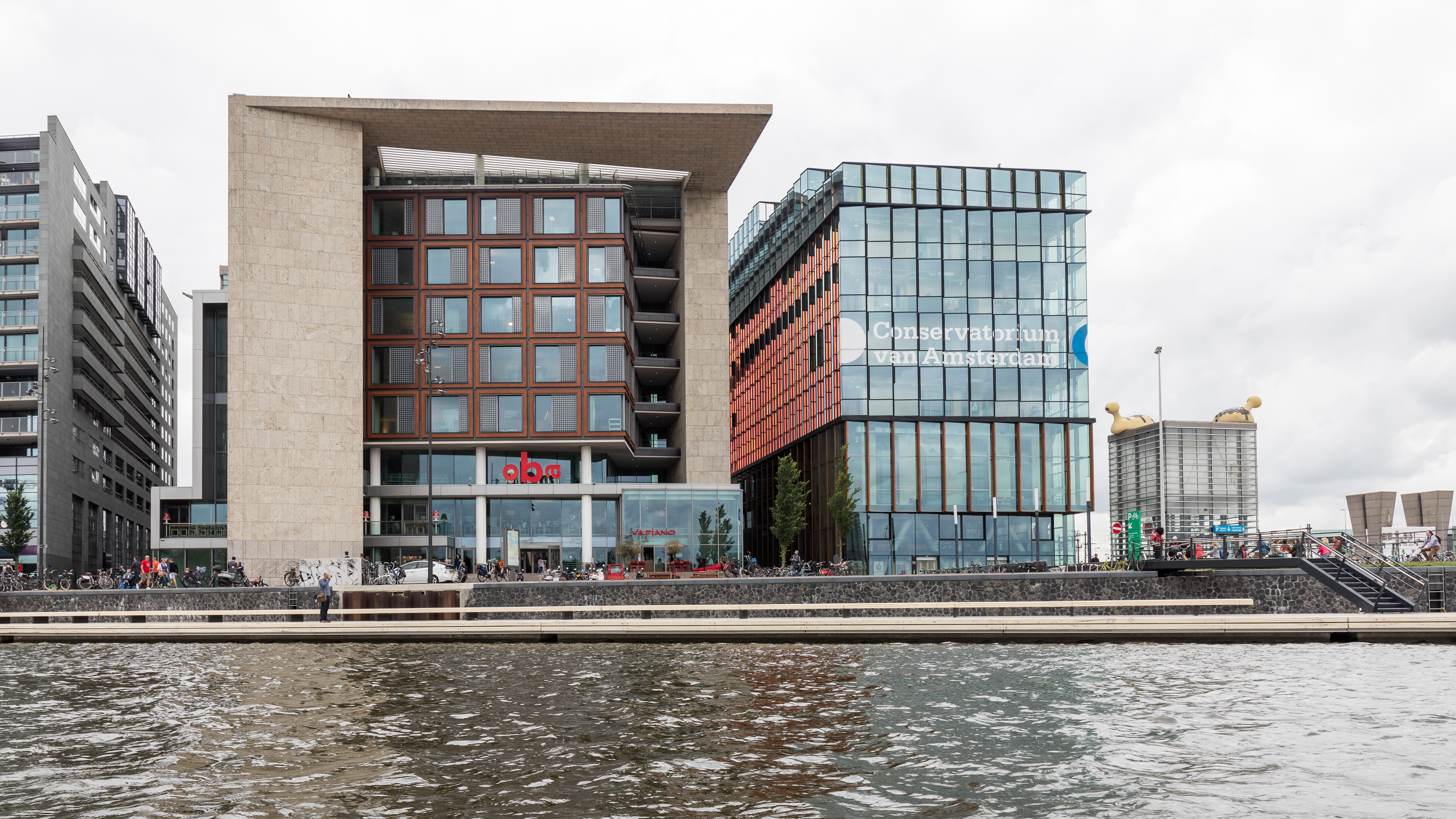
The Openbare Bibliotheek Amsterdam and Conservatorium van Amsterdam, two examples of 21st-century architecture in the centre of the city

Philip Vingboons designed splendid merchants' houses throughout the city. A famous building in baroque style in Amsterdam is the Royal Palace on Dam Square. Throughout the 18th century, Amsterdam was heavily influenced by French culture. This is reflected in the architecture of that period. Around 1815, architects broke with the baroque style and started building in different neo-styles. Most Gothic style buildings date from that era and are therefore said to be built in a neo-gothic style. At the end of the 19th century, the Jugendstil or Art Nouveau style became popular and many new buildings were constructed in this architectural style. Since Amsterdam expanded rapidly during this period, new buildings adjacent to the city centre were also built in this style. The houses in the vicinity of the Museum Square in Amsterdam Oud-Zuid are an example of Jugendstil. The last style that was popular in Amsterdam before the modern era was Art Deco. Amsterdam had its own version of the style, which was called the Amsterdamse School. Whole districts were built in this style, such as the Rivierenbuurt. A notable feature of the façades of buildings designed in Amsterdamse School is that they are highly decorated and ornate, with oddly shaped windows and doors.

The old city centre is the focal point of all the architectural styles before the end of the 19th century. Jugendstil and Georgian are mostly found outside the city centre in the neighbourhoods built in the early 20th century, although there are also some striking examples of these styles in the city centre. Most historic buildings in the city centre and nearby are houses, such as the famous merchants' houses lining the canals.

=== Parks and recreational areas ===
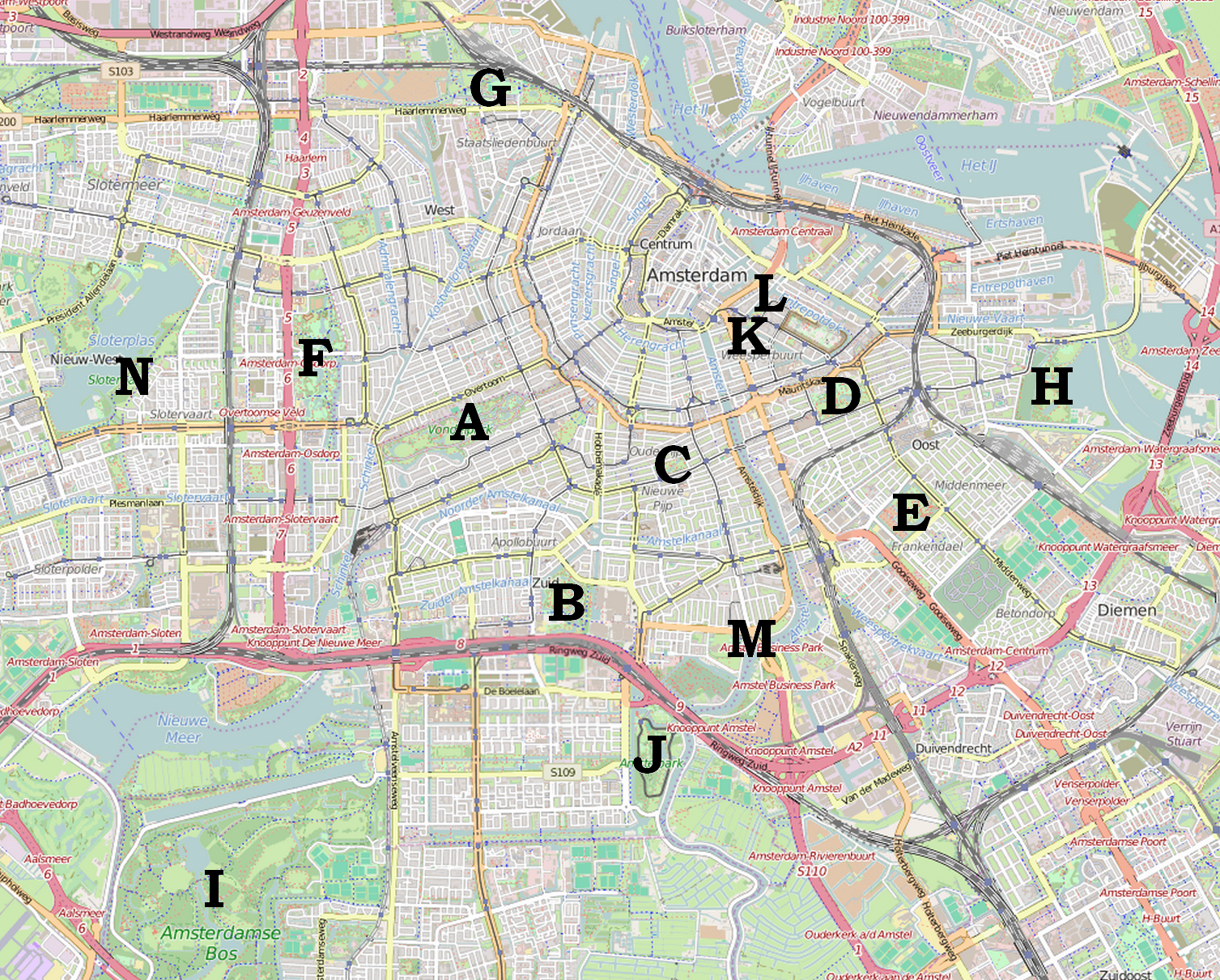
A: Vondelpark; B: Beatrixpark; C: Sarphatipark; D: Oosterpark; E: Park Frankendael; F: Rembrandtpark; G: Westerpark; H: Flevopark; I: Amsterdamse Bos; J: Amstelpark; K: Hortus Botanicus; L: Wertheimerpark; M: Martin Luther Kingpark; N: Sloterpark

Amsterdam has many parks, open spaces, and squares throughout the city. The Vondelpark, the largest park in the city, is located in the Oud-Zuid neighbourhood and is named after the 17th-century Amsterdam author Joost van den Vondel. Yearly, the park has around 10 million visitors. In the park is an open-air theatre, a playground, and several horeca facilities. In the Zuid borough, is the Beatrixpark, named after Queen Beatrix. Between Amsterdam and Amstelveen is the Amsterdamse Bos ("Amsterdam Forest"), the largest recreational area in Amsterdam. Annually, almost 4.5 million people visit the park, which has a size of 1,000 hectares (2,500 acres) and is approximately three times the size of Central Park. The Amstelpark in the Zuid borough houses the Rieker windmill, which dates to 1636. Other parks include the Sarphatipark in the De Pijp neighbourhood, the Oosterpark in the Oost borough and the Westerpark in the Westerpark neighbourhood. The city has three beaches: Nemo Beach and Citybeach "Het Stenen Hoofd" (Silodam) in the Centrum borough, and Strand IJburg on IJburg in Oost.

The city has many open squares (plein in Dutch). The namesake of the city as the site of the original dam, Dam Square, is the main city square and has the Royal Palace and National Monument. Museumplein hosts various museums, including the Rijksmuseum, Van Gogh Museum, and Stedelijk Museum. Other squares include Rembrandtplein, Muntplein, Nieuwmarkt, Leidseplein, Spui and Waterlooplein.

== Economy ==
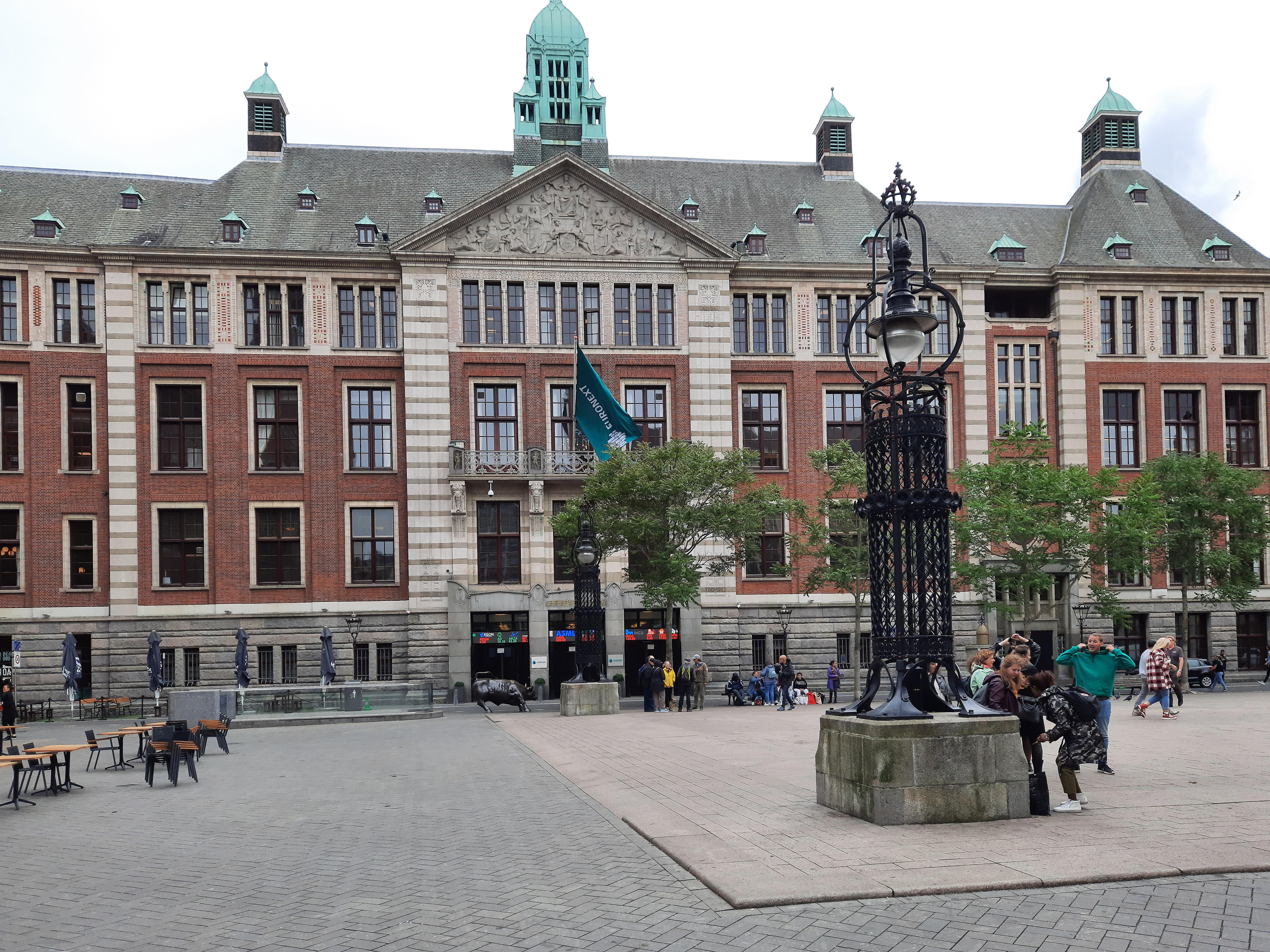
The Amsterdam Stock Exchange, the oldest stock exchange in the world

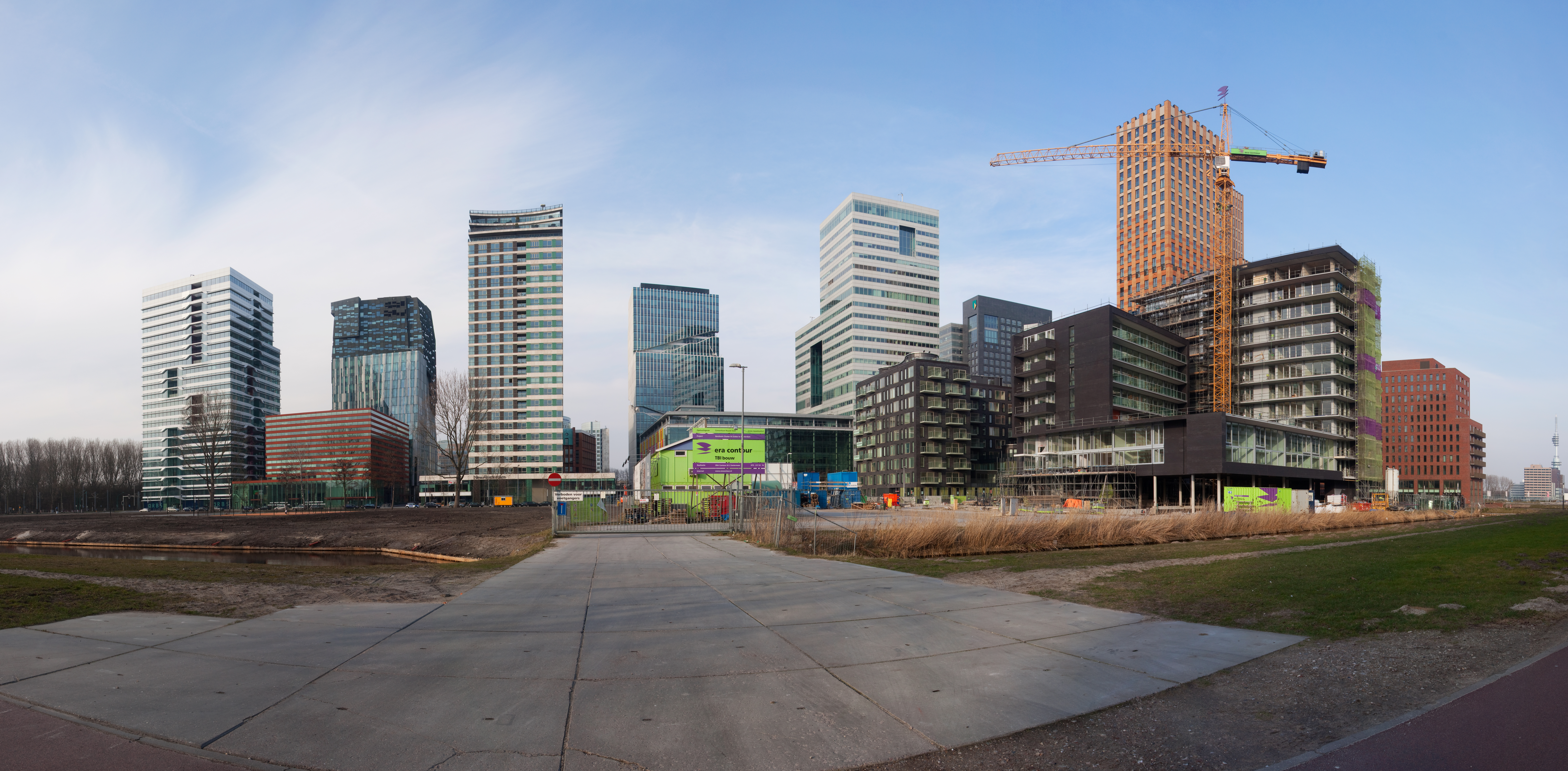
The Zuidas, the city's main business district

Amsterdam is the financial and business capital of the Netherlands. According to the 2007 European Cities Monitor (ECM) – an annual location survey of Europe's leading companies carried out by global real estate consultant Cushman & Wakefield – Amsterdam is one of the top European cities in which to locate an international business, ranking fifth in the survey, with the survey determining London, Paris, Frankfurt and Barcelona as the four European cities surpassing Amsterdam in this regard.

A substantial number of large corporations and banks' headquarters are located in the Amsterdam area, including: AkzoNobel, Heineken International, ING Group, ABN AMRO, TomTom, Booking.com and Philips. Although many small offices remain along the historic canals, centrally based companies have increasingly relocated outside Amsterdam's city centre. Consequently, the Zuidas (English: South Axis) has become the new financial and legal hub of Amsterdam, with the country's five largest law firms and several subsidiaries of large consulting firms, such as Boston Consulting Group and Accenture, as well as the World Trade Centre (Amsterdam) located in the Zuidas district. In addition to the Zuidas, there are three smaller financial districts in Amsterdam:

- around Amsterdam Sloterdijk railway station. Where one can find the offices of several newspapers, such as De Telegraaf, as well as those of Deloitte, the GVB (municipal public transport company), and the Dutch tax offices (Belastingdienst);
- around the Johan Cruyff Arena in Amsterdam Zuidoost, with the headquarters of ING Group;
- around the Amstel railway station in the Amsterdam-Oost district to the east of the historical city. Amsterdam's tallest building, the Rembrandt Tower, is located here. As are the headquarters of Philips, the Dutch multinational conglomerate.

Amsterdam has been a leading city to reduce the use of raw materials and has created a plan to become a circular city by 2050.

The adjoining municipality of Amstelveen is the location of KPMG International's global headquarters. Other non-Dutch companies have chosen to settle in communities surrounding Amsterdam, for they allow freehold property ownership, whereas Amsterdam retains ground rent.

The Amsterdam Stock Exchange (AEX), now part of Euronext, is the world's oldest stock exchange and, due to Brexit, has overtaken LSE as the largest bourse in Europe. It is near Dam Square in the city centre.

Amsterdam-Noord is also home to the Energy Transition Campus Amsterdam, Shell's technology centre, which was opened in 2021 to start-ups, companies and research institutions as a shared research and testing site for energy technologies.

=== Port of Amsterdam ===
The Port of Amsterdam is the fourth-largest port in Europe, the 38th largest port in the world, and the second-largest port in the Netherlands, after Port of Rotterdam, by metric tons of cargo. In 2014, the Port of Amsterdam had a cargo throughput of 97,4 million tons of cargo, which was mostly bulk cargo. Amsterdam has the biggest cruise port in the Netherlands with more than 150 cruise ships every year. In 2019, the new lock in IJmuiden opened; since then, the port has been able to grow to 125 million tonnes in capacity.

=== Tourism ===
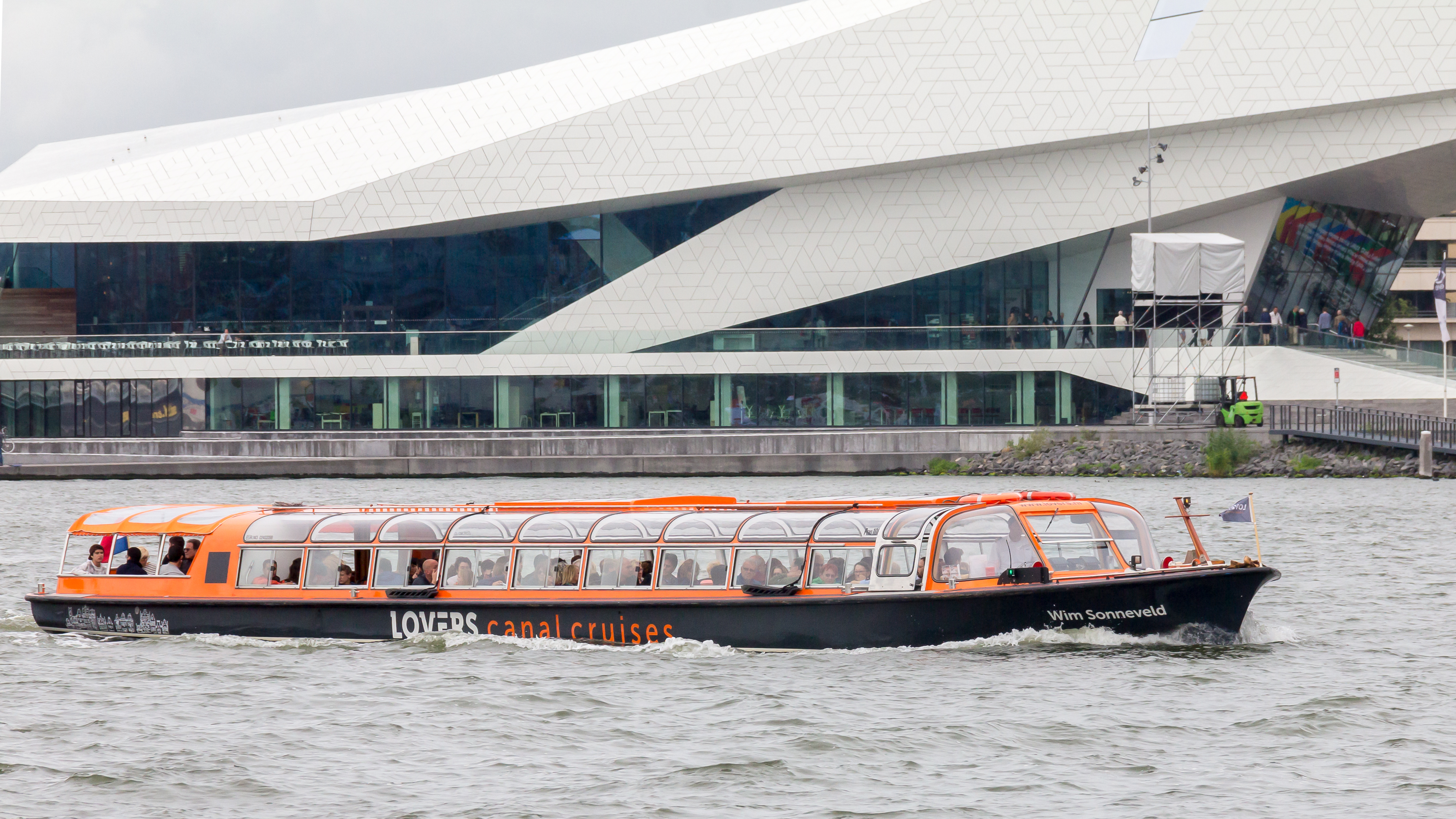
Boats give tours of the city, such as this one in front of the EYE Film Institute Netherlands.

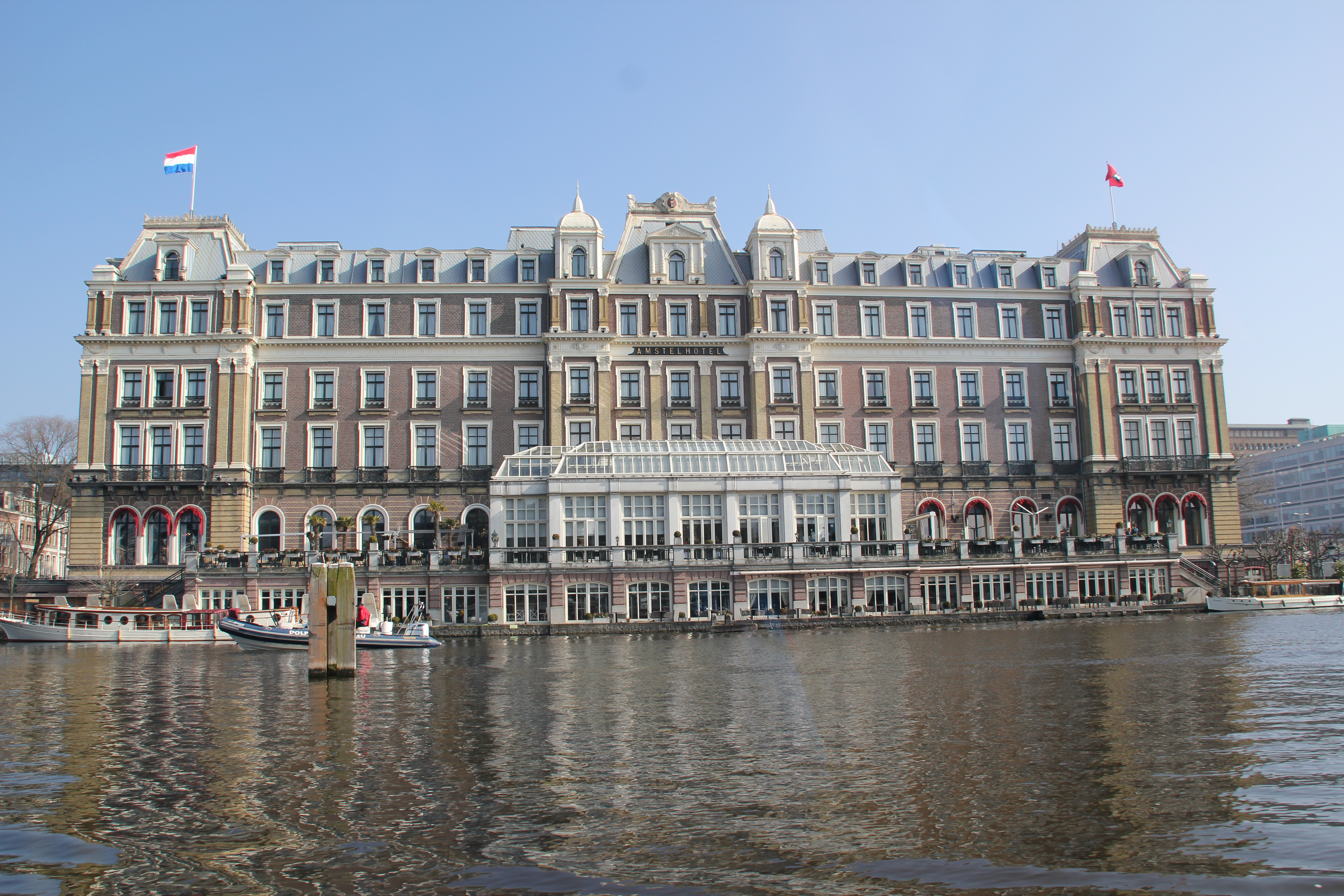
The InterContinental Amstel Amsterdam, commonly referred to as the Amstel Hotel located on the east bank of the river Amstel

Amsterdam is one of the most popular tourist destinations in Europe, receiving more than 5.34 million international visitors in 2009; this is excluding the 16 million day-trippers visiting the city every year. The number of visitors has been growing steadily over the past decade. This can be attributed to an increasing number of European visitors. Two-thirds of the hotels are located in the city's centre. Hotels with four or five stars contribute 42% of the total beds available and 41% of the overnight stays in Amsterdam. The room occupation rate was 85% in 2017, up from 78% in 2006. The majority of tourists (74%) originate from Europe. The largest group of non-European visitors come from the United States, accounting for 14% of the total. Certain years have a theme in Amsterdam to attract extra tourists. For example, the year 2006 was designated "Rembrandt 400", to celebrate the 400th birthday of Rembrandt van Rijn. Some hotels offer special arrangements or activities during these years. The average number of guests per year staying at the four campsites around the city ranges from 12,000 to 65,000.

In 2023, the city began running the Stay Away ad campaign to dissuade British men between the ages of 18 and 35 from coming to the city as tourists. One ad shows young men being handcuffed by police and is part of a new campaign to clean up the city's reputation. On 25 May 2023, in a bid to crackdown on wild tourist behaviour, the city banned cannabis smoking in public areas in and around the red light district.

==== De Wallen (red-light district) ====
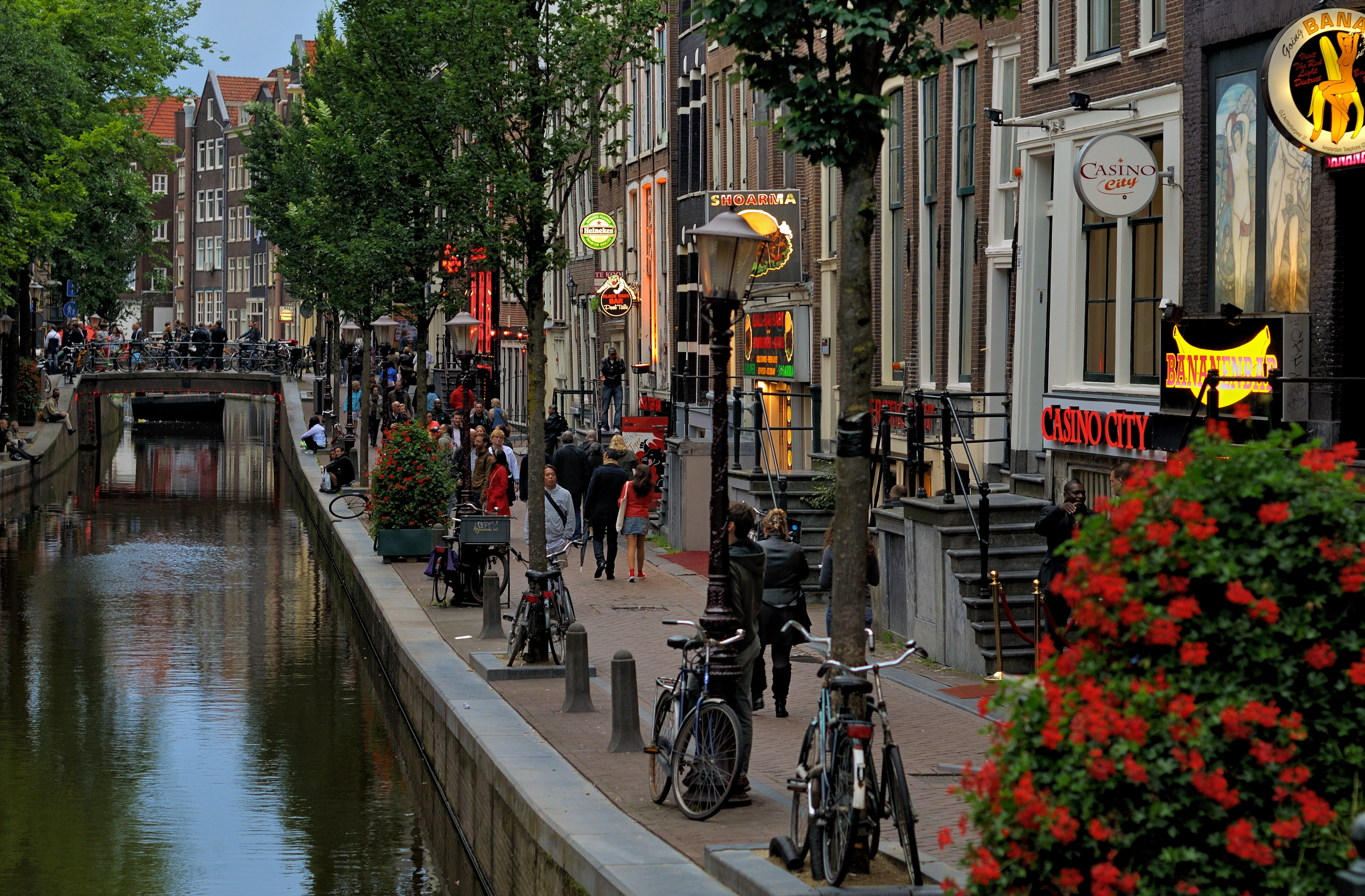
De Wallen, Amsterdam's red-light district, offers activities such as legal prostitution and a number of coffee shops that sell cannabis. It is one of the main tourist attractions.

De Wallen, also known as Walletjes or Rosse Buurt, is a designated area for legalised prostitution and is Amsterdam's largest and best-known red-light district. This neighbourhood has become a famous attraction for tourists. It consists of a network of canals, streets, and alleys containing several hundred small, one-room apartments rented by sex workers who offer their services from behind a window or glass door, typically illuminated with red lights. In recent years, the city government has been closing and repurposing the famous red-light district windows to clean up the area and reduce the amount of party and sex tourism.

=== Retail ===
Shops in Amsterdam range from large high-end department stores such as De Bijenkorf founded in 1870 to small specialty shops. Amsterdam's high-end shops are found in the streets P.C. Hooftstraat and Cornelis Schuytstraat, which are located in the vicinity of the Vondelpark. One of Amsterdam's busiest high streets is the narrow, medieval Kalverstraat in the heart of the city. Other shopping areas include the Negen Straatjes and Haarlemmerdijk and Haarlemmerstraat. Negen Straatjes are nine narrow streets within the Grachtengordel, the concentric canal system of Amsterdam. The Negen Straatjes differ from other shopping districts with the presence of a large diversity of privately owned shops. The Haarlemmerstraat and Haarlemmerdijk were voted the best shopping street in the Netherlands in 2011. These streets have as the Negen Straatjes a large diversity of privately owned shops. However, as the Negen Straatjes is dominated by fashion stores, the Haarlemmerstraat and Haarlemmerdijk offer a wide variety of stores, just to name some specialties: candy and other food-related stores, lingerie, sneakers, wedding clothing, interior shops, books, Italian deli's, racing and mountain bikes, skatewear, etc.

The city also features a large number of open-air markets such as the Albert Cuyp Market, Westerstraat-markt, Ten Katemarkt, and Dappermarkt. Some of these markets are held daily, like the Albert Cuypmarkt and the Dappermarkt. Others, like the Westerstraatmarkt, are held every week.

=== Fashion ===
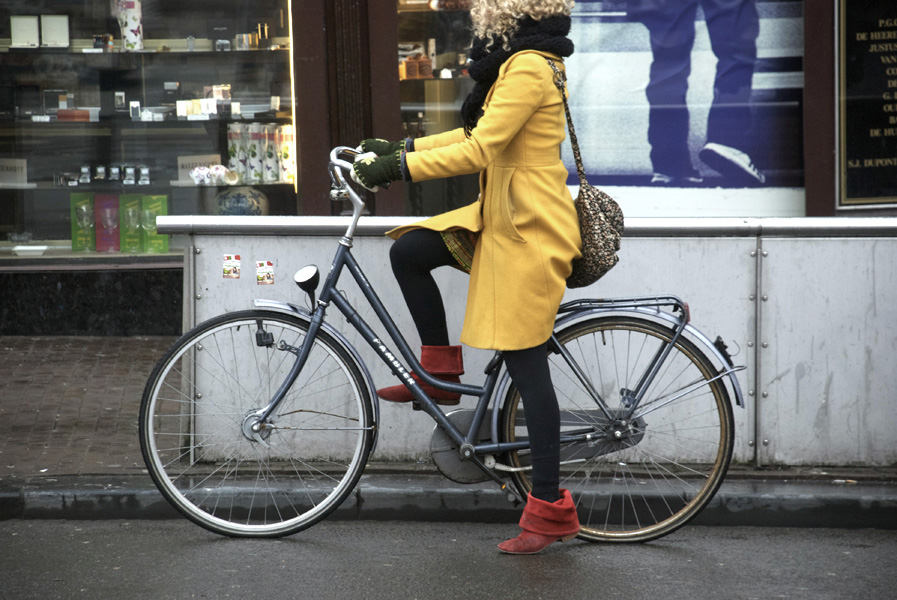
An Amsterdammer waits for a traffic light to change at the Muntplein in the heart of Amsterdam.

Several fashion brands and designers are based in Amsterdam. Fashion designers include Iris van Herpen, Mart Visser, Viktor & Rolf, Marlies Dekkers and Frans Molenaar. Fashion models like Yfke Sturm, Doutzen Kroes and Kim Noorda started their careers in Amsterdam. Amsterdam has its garment centre in the World Fashion Center. Fashion photographers Inez van Lamsweerde and Vinoodh Matadin were born in Amsterdam.

== Culture ==
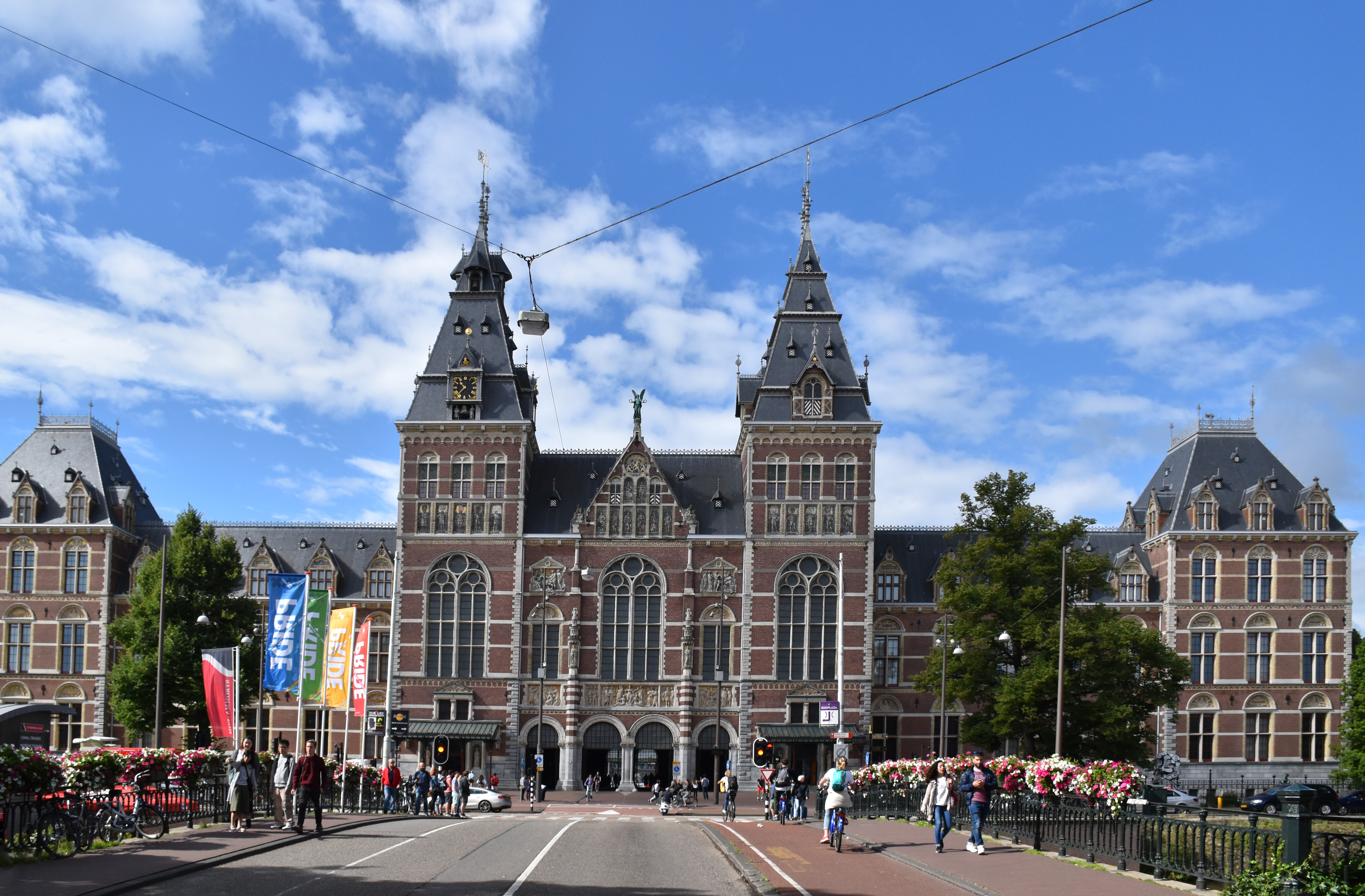
The Rijksmuseum houses Rembrandt's The Night Watch.

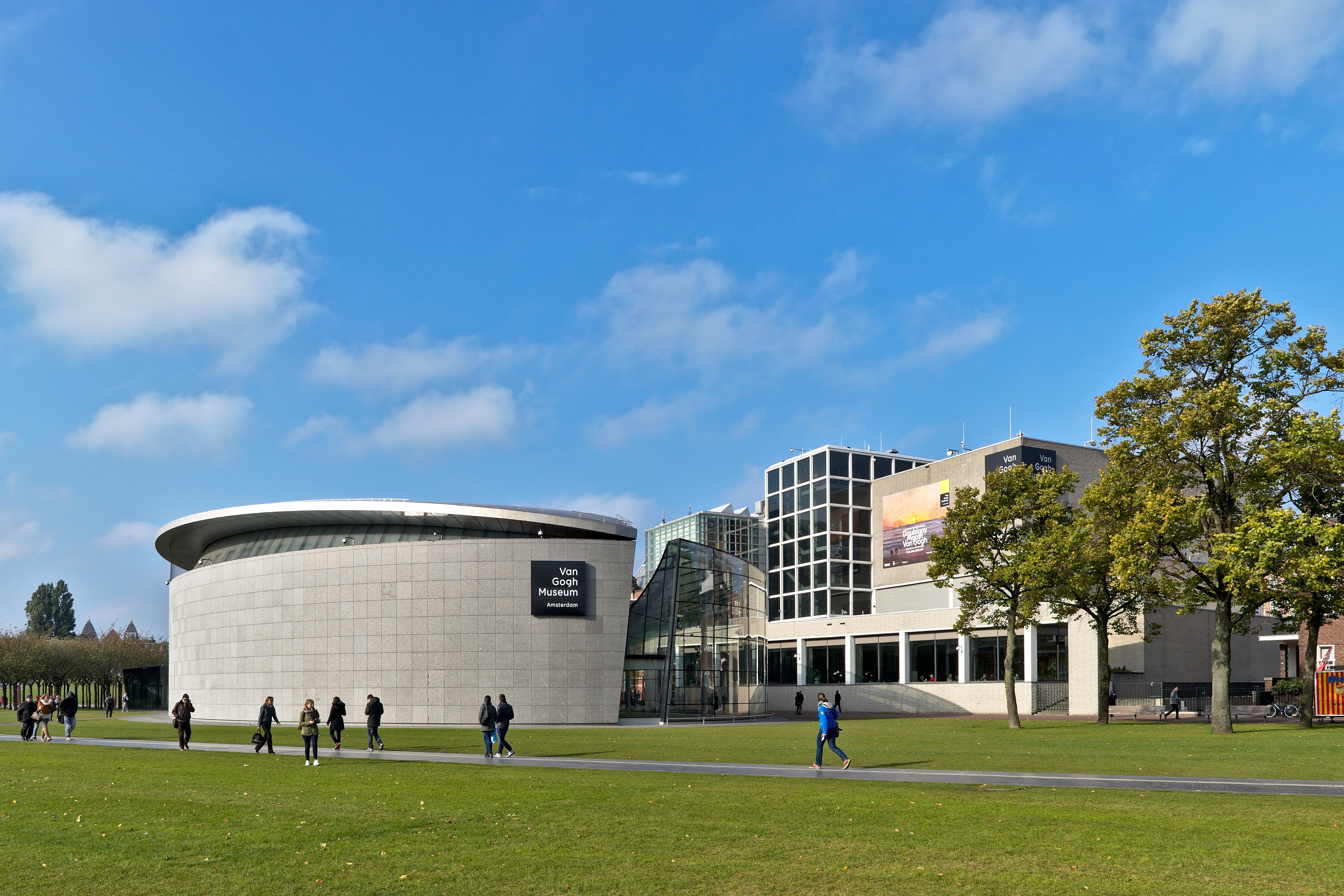
The Van Gogh Museum houses the world's largest collection of Van Gogh's paintings and letters.

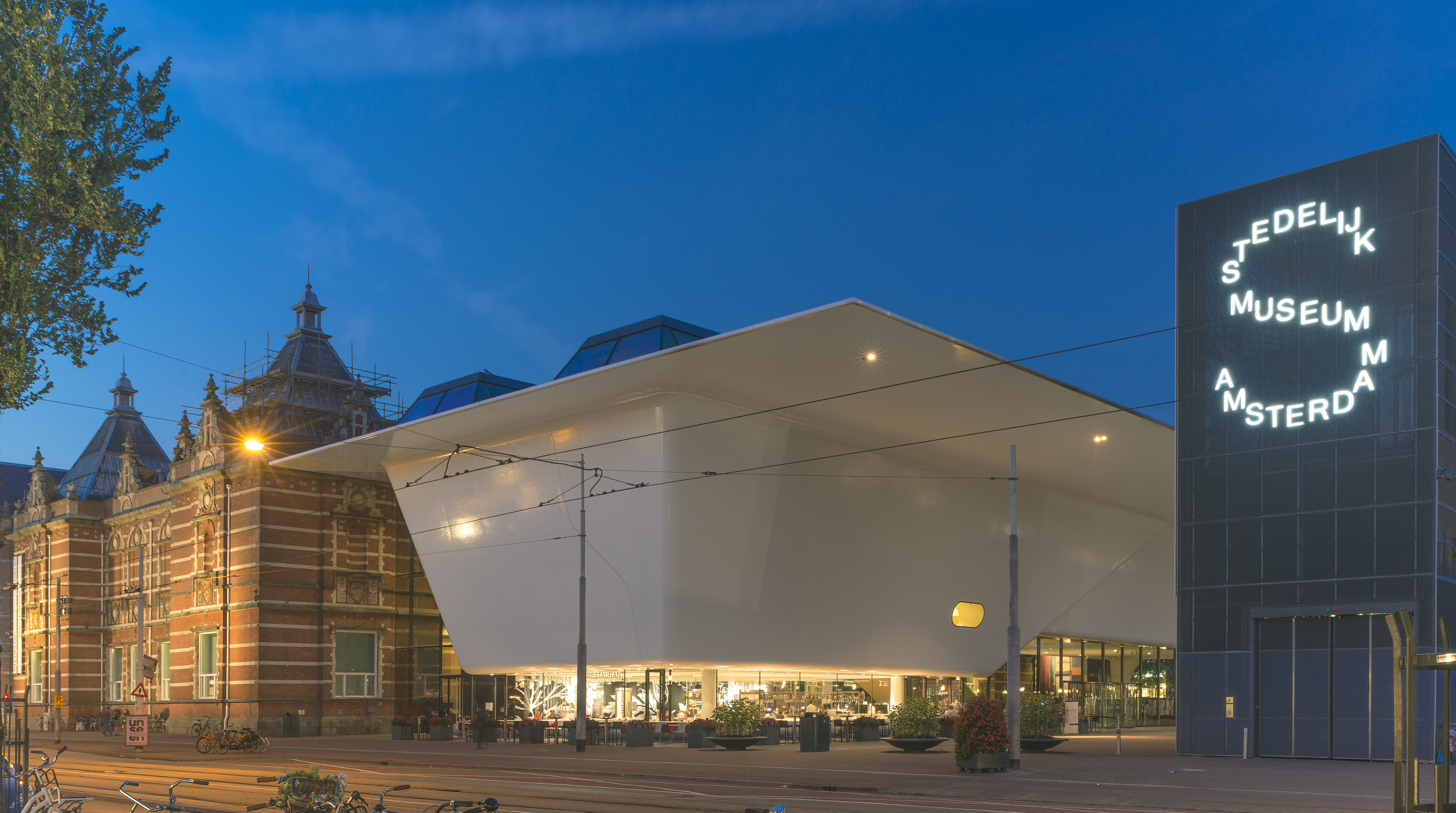
The Stedelijk Museum Amsterdam is an international museum dedicated to modern and contemporary art and design.

During the later part of the 16th century, Amsterdam's Rederijkerskamer (Chamber of rhetoric) organised contests between different Chambers in the reading of poetry and drama. In 1637, Schouwburg, the first theatre in Amsterdam was built, opening on 3 January 1638. The first ballet performances in the Netherlands were given in Schouwburg in 1642 with the Ballet of the Five Senses. In the 18th century, French theatre became popular. While Amsterdam was under the influence of German music in the 19th century there were few national opera productions; the Hollandse Opera of Amsterdam was built in 1888 for the specific purpose of promoting Dutch opera. In the 19th century, popular culture was centred on the Nes area in Amsterdam (mainly vaudeville and music-hall). An improved metronome was invented in 1812 by Dietrich Nikolaus Winkel. The Rijksmuseum (1885) and Stedelijk Museum (1895) were built and opened. In 1888, the Concertgebouworkest orchestra was established. With the 20th century came cinema, radio and television. Though most studios are located in Hilversum and Aalsmeer, Amsterdam's influence on programming is very strong. Many people who work in the television industry live in Amsterdam. Also, the headquarters of the Dutch SBS Broadcasting Group is located in Amsterdam. There are also a number of cultural centres based in the city that produce public programs about the arts, sciences, politics and history, including de Balie and the John Adams Institute.

=== Museums ===
The most important museums of Amsterdam are located on the Museumplein (Museum Square), located at the southwestern side of the Rijksmuseum. It was created in the last quarter of the 19th century on the grounds of the former World's fair. The northeastern part of the square is bordered by the large Rijksmuseum. In front of the Rijksmuseum on the square itself is a long, rectangular pond. This is transformed into an ice rink in winter. The northwestern part of the square is bordered by the Van Gogh Museum, House of Bols Cocktail & Genever Experience and Coster Diamonds. The southwestern border of the Museum Square is the Van Baerlestraat, which is a major thoroughfare in this part of Amsterdam. The Concertgebouw is located across this street from the square. To the southeast of the square are several large houses, one of which contains the American consulate. A parking garage can be found underneath the square, as well as a supermarket. The Museumplein is covered almost entirely with a lawn, except for the northeastern part of the square which is covered with gravel. The current appearance of the square was realised in 1999 when the square was remodelled. The square itself is the most prominent site in Amsterdam for festivals and outdoor concerts, especially in the summer. Plans were made in 2008 to remodel the square again because many inhabitants of Amsterdam are not happy with its current appearance.

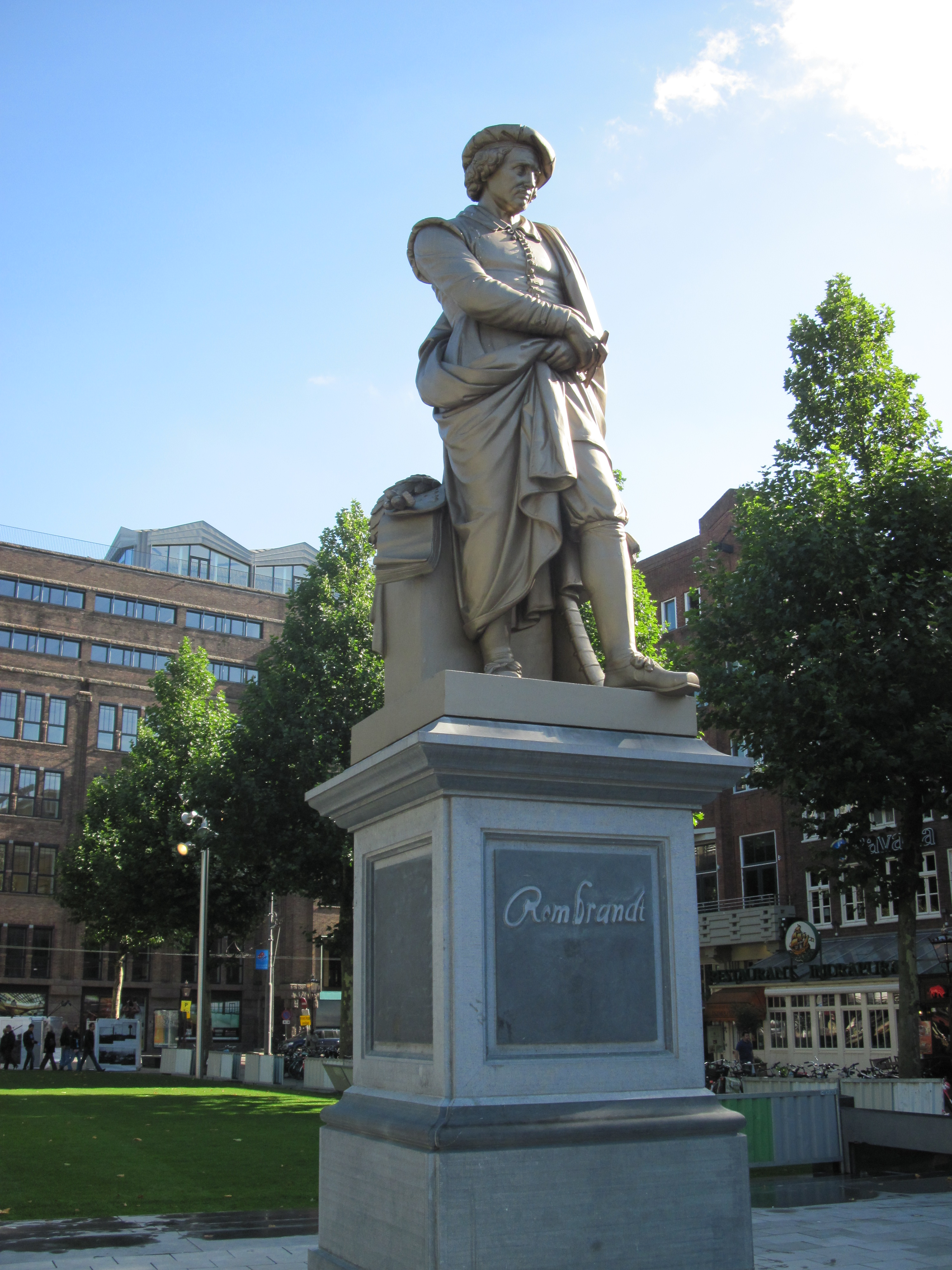
Rembrandt monument on Rembrandtplein

The Rijksmuseum possesses the largest and most important collection of classical Dutch art. It opened in 1885. Its collection consists of nearly one million objects. The artist most associated with Amsterdam is Rembrandt, whose work, and the work of his pupils, is displayed in the Rijksmuseum. Rembrandt's masterpiece The Night Watch is one of the top pieces of art in the museum. It also houses paintings from artists like Bartholomeus van der Helst, Johannes Vermeer, Frans Hals, Ferdinand Bol, Albert Cuyp, Jacob van Ruisdael and Paulus Potter. Aside from paintings, the collection consists of a large variety of decorative art. This ranges from Delftware to giant doll-houses from the 17th century. The architect of the gothic revival building was P.J.H. Cuypers. The museum underwent a 10-year, 375 million euro renovation starting in 2003. The full collection was reopened to the public on 13 April 2013. The Rijksmuseum has remained the most visited museum in Amsterdam with 2.4 million visitors in 2024.

Van Gogh lived in Amsterdam for a short while and there is a museum dedicated to his work. The museum is housed in one of the few modern buildings in this area of Amsterdam. The building was designed by Gerrit Rietveld. This building is where the permanent collection is displayed. A new building was added to the museum in 1999. This building, known as the performance wing, was designed by Japanese architect Kisho Kurokawa. Its purpose is to house temporary exhibitions of the museum. Some of Van Gogh's most famous paintings, like The Potato Eaters and Sunflowers, are in the collection. The Van Gogh museum is the second most visited museum in Amsterdam, not far behind the Rijksmuseum in terms of the number of visits, being approximately 1.8 million in 2024.

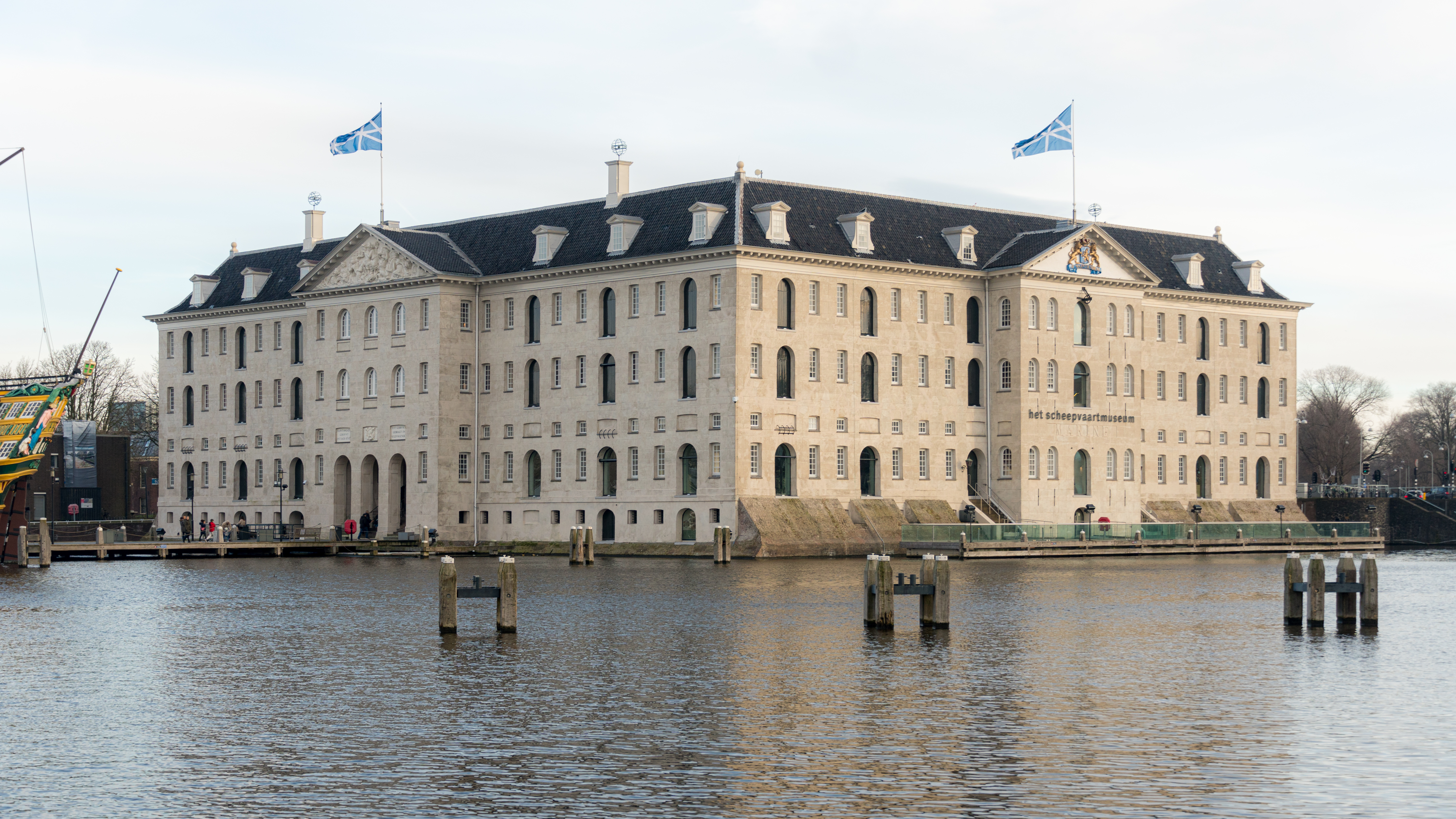
Het Scheepvaartmuseum

Next to the Van Gogh Museum stands the Stedelijk Museum. This is Amsterdam's most important museum of modern art. The museum is as old as the square it borders and was opened in 1895. The permanent collection consists of works of art from artists like Piet Mondrian, Karel Appel, and Kazimir Malevich. After renovations lasting several years, the museum opened in September 2012 with a new composite extension that has been called 'The Bathtub' due to its resemblance to one.

Amsterdam contains many other museums throughout the city. They range from small museums such as the Verzetsmuseum (Resistance Museum), KattenKabinet ("Cat Cabinet"), the Anne Frank House, and the Rembrandt House Museum, to the very large, like the Tropenmuseum (Museum of the Tropics), Amsterdam Museum (formerly known as Amsterdam Historical Museum), H'ART Museum and the Joods Historisch Museum (Jewish Historical Museum). The modern-styled Nemo is dedicated to child-friendly science exhibitions.

=== Music ===
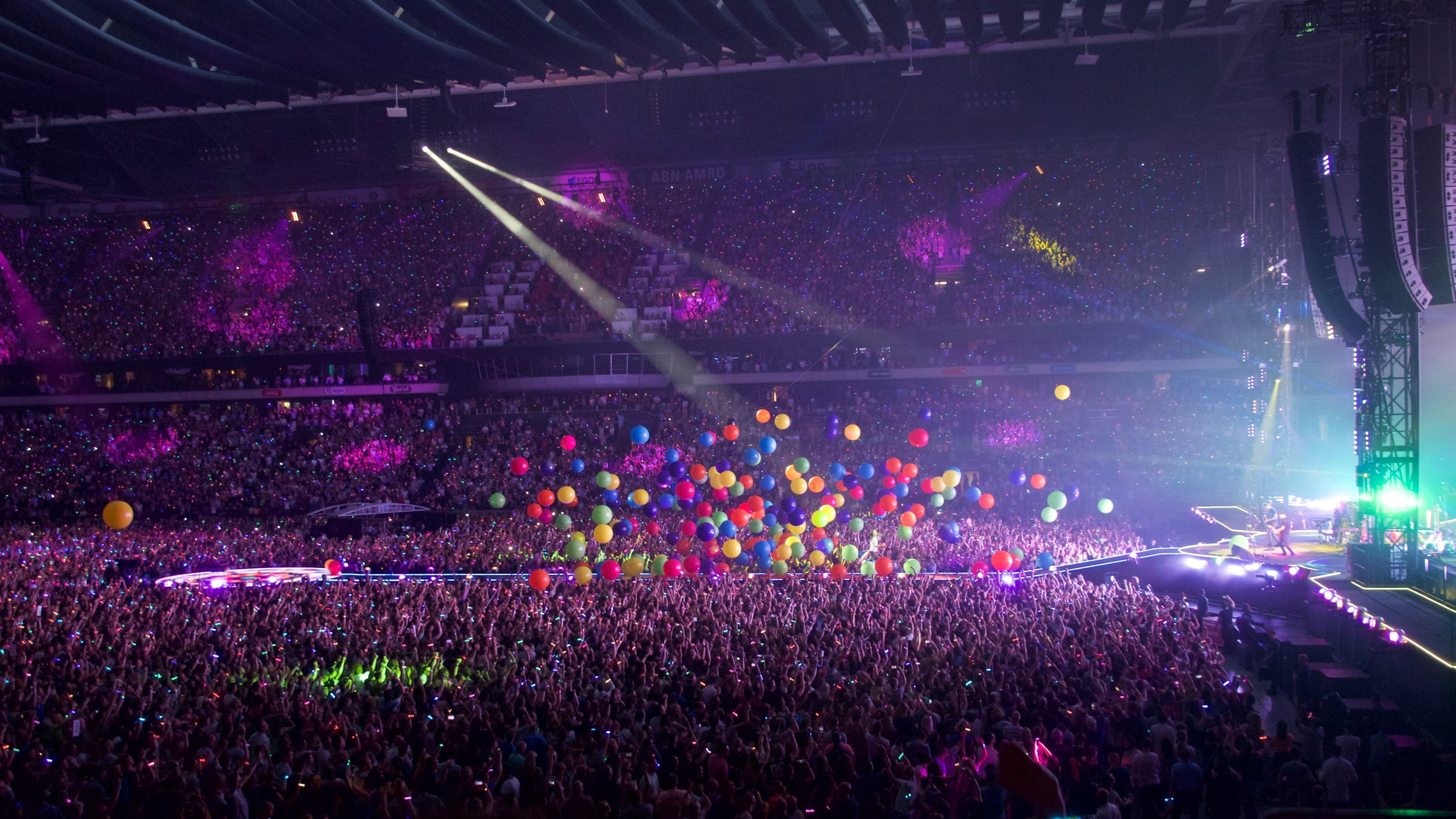
Coldplay performing at the Johan Cruyff Arena, 2016

Amsterdam's musical culture includes a large collection of songs that treat the city nostalgically and lovingly. The 1949 song "Aan de Amsterdamse grachten" ("On the canals of Amsterdam") was performed and recorded by many artists, including John Kraaijkamp Sr.; the best-known version is probably that by Wim Sonneveld (1962). In the 1950s Johnny Jordaan rose to fame with "Geef mij maar Amsterdam" ("I prefer Amsterdam"), which praises the city above all others (explicitly Paris); Jordaan sang especially about his own neighbourhood, the Jordaan ("Bij ons in de Jordaan"). Colleagues and contemporaries of Johnny include Tante Leen and Manke Nelis. Another notable Amsterdam song is "Amsterdam" by Jacques Brel (1964). A 2011 poll by Amsterdam newspaper Het Parool that Trio Bier's "Oude Wolf" was voted "Amsterdams lijflied". Notable Amsterdam bands from the modern era include the Osdorp Posse and the Ex.

AFAS Live (formerly known as the Heineken Music Hall) is a concert hall located near the Johan Cruyff Arena (known as the Amsterdam Arena until 2018). Its main purpose is to serve as a podium for pop concerts for big audiences. Many famous international artists have performed there. Two other notable venues, Paradiso and the Melkweg are located near the Leidseplein. Both focus on broad programming, ranging from indie rock to hip-hop, R&B, and other popular genres. Other subcultural music venues are OCCII, OT301, De Nieuwe Anita, Winston Kingdom, and Zaal 100. Jazz has a strong following in Amsterdam, with the Bimhuis being the premier venue. In 2012, Ziggo Dome was opened, also near Amsterdam Arena, a state-of-the-art indoor music arena.

AFAS Live is also host to many electronic dance music festivals, alongside many other venues. Armin van Buuren and Tiësto, some of the world's leading Trance DJs hail from the Netherlands and frequently perform in Amsterdam. Each year in October, the city hosts the Amsterdam Dance Event (ADE) which is one of the leading electronic music conferences and one of the biggest club festivals for electronic music in the world, attracting over 350,000 visitors each year. Another popular dance festival is 5daysoff, which takes place in the venues Paradiso and Melkweg. In the summertime, there are several big outdoor dance parties in or nearby Amsterdam, such as Awakenings, Dance Valley, Mysteryland, Loveland, A Day at the Park, Welcome to the Future, and Valtifest.

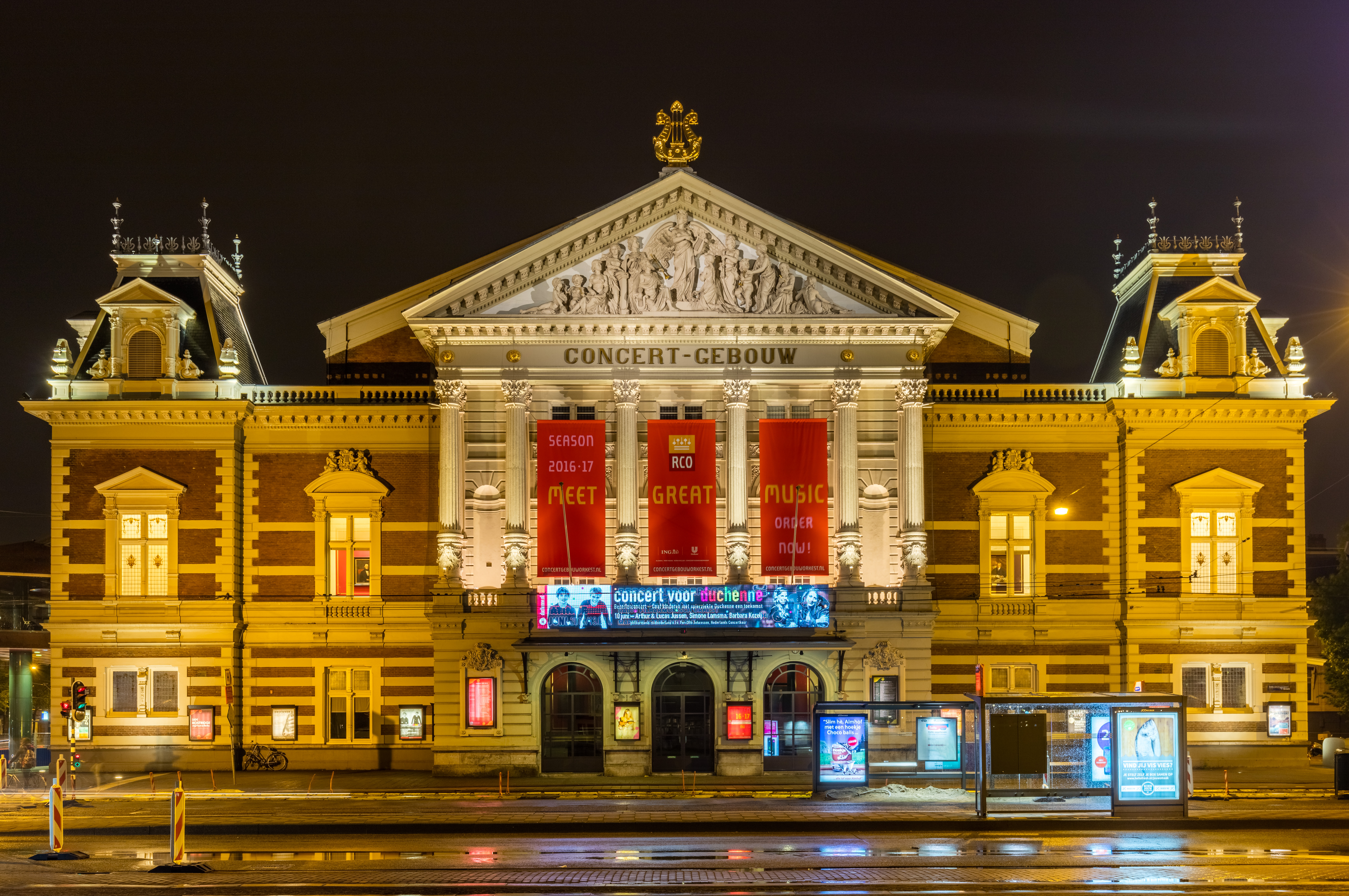
The Concertgebouw or Royal Concert Hall houses performances of the Royal Concertgebouw Orchestra and other musical events.

Amsterdam has a world-class symphony orchestra, the Royal Concertgebouw Orchestra. Their home is the Concertgebouw, which is across the Van Baerlestraat from the Museum Square. It is considered by critics to be a concert hall with some of the best acoustics in the world. The building contains three halls, Grote Zaal, Kleine Zaal, and Spiegelzaal. Some nine hundred concerts and other events per year take place in the Concertgebouw, for a public of over 700,000, making it one of the most-visited concert halls in the world. The opera house of Amsterdam is located adjacent to the city hall. Therefore, the two buildings combined are often called the Stopera, (a word originally coined by protesters against its very construction: Stop the Opera[-house]). This huge modern complex, opened in 1986, lies in the former Jewish neighbourhood at Waterlooplein next to the river Amstel. The Stopera is the home base of Dutch National Opera, Dutch National Ballet and Het Balletorkest. Muziekgebouw aan 't IJ is a concert hall, which is located in the IJ near the central station. Its concerts perform mostly modern classical music. Located adjacent to it, is the Bimhuis, a concert hall for improvised and jazz music.

=== Theatre and dance ===
The Stadsschouwburg on the Leidseplein, since 2018 known as Internationaal Theater Amsterdam

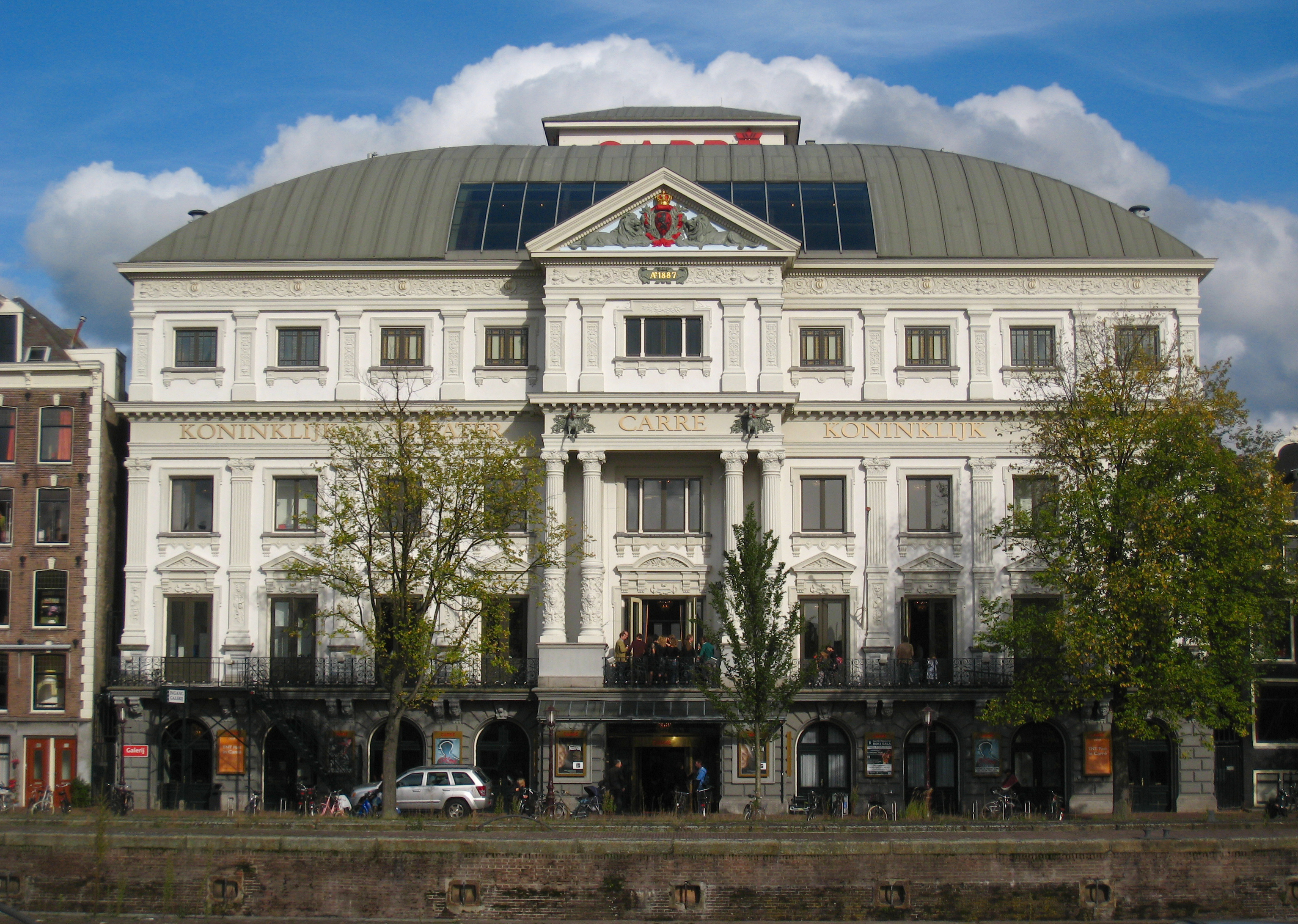
Royal Theater Carré, originally built as a permanent circus building

The Stadsschouwburg on the Leidseplein, whose current building dates from 1894, is the largest of the city's theatres. It was long the home of the repertory company Toneelgroep Amsterdam, which played both the main auditorium and the Rabozaal, added in 2009. The theatre and the company merged on 1 January 2018 and have operated since the 2018–19 season under the name Internationaal Theater Amsterdam (ITA), producing and presenting work in a single organisation. The venue hosts festivals including the Holland Festival, Julidans and the Nederlands Theater Festival.

Dutch National Opera and Ballet on the Waterlooplein is the city's principal opera house. Royal Theatre Carré on the Amstel opened on 3 December 1887 as a permanent stone circus building for the circus director Oscar Carré, and turned to variety, revue and drama within a few years; it is now used mainly for musicals, cabaret and pop concerts.

DeLaMar, near the Leidseplein, reopened in November 2010 after a rebuilding financed by the VandenEnde Foundation, on the site of the former Nieuwe de la Mar Theater. Its two auditoriums seat 939 and 601, and it programmes mainly plays, musicals and cabaret. Theater Amsterdam, on the Danzigerkade in the western Houthavens, opened in May 2014 as a privately financed venue built around a single long-running production, ANNE, based on the diary of Anne Frank; it was the first theatre purpose-built for the SceneAround system, in which the audience sits on a revolving stand. The building is now used largely as an events venue.

On the east side of town, the Badhuistheater is a small theatre in a converted bathhouse, which often programmes work in English.

The Netherlands has a tradition of cabaret, or kleinkunst, which combines music, storytelling, commentary, theatre and comedy. It dates back to the 1930s, and artists such as Wim Kan, Wim Sonneveld and Toon Hermans were among its pioneers. Amsterdam is home to the Kleinkunstacademie, a conservatory training programme for the form. Contemporary performers include Youp van 't Hek, Freek de Jonge, Herman Finkers, Hans Teeuwen, Theo Maassen, Herman van Veen, Najib Amhali, Raoul Heertje, Jörgen Raymann and Brigitte Kaandorp. The English-language comedy scene was established with the founding of Boom Chicago in 1993, which has its own theatre near the Leidseplein.

=== Nightlife ===
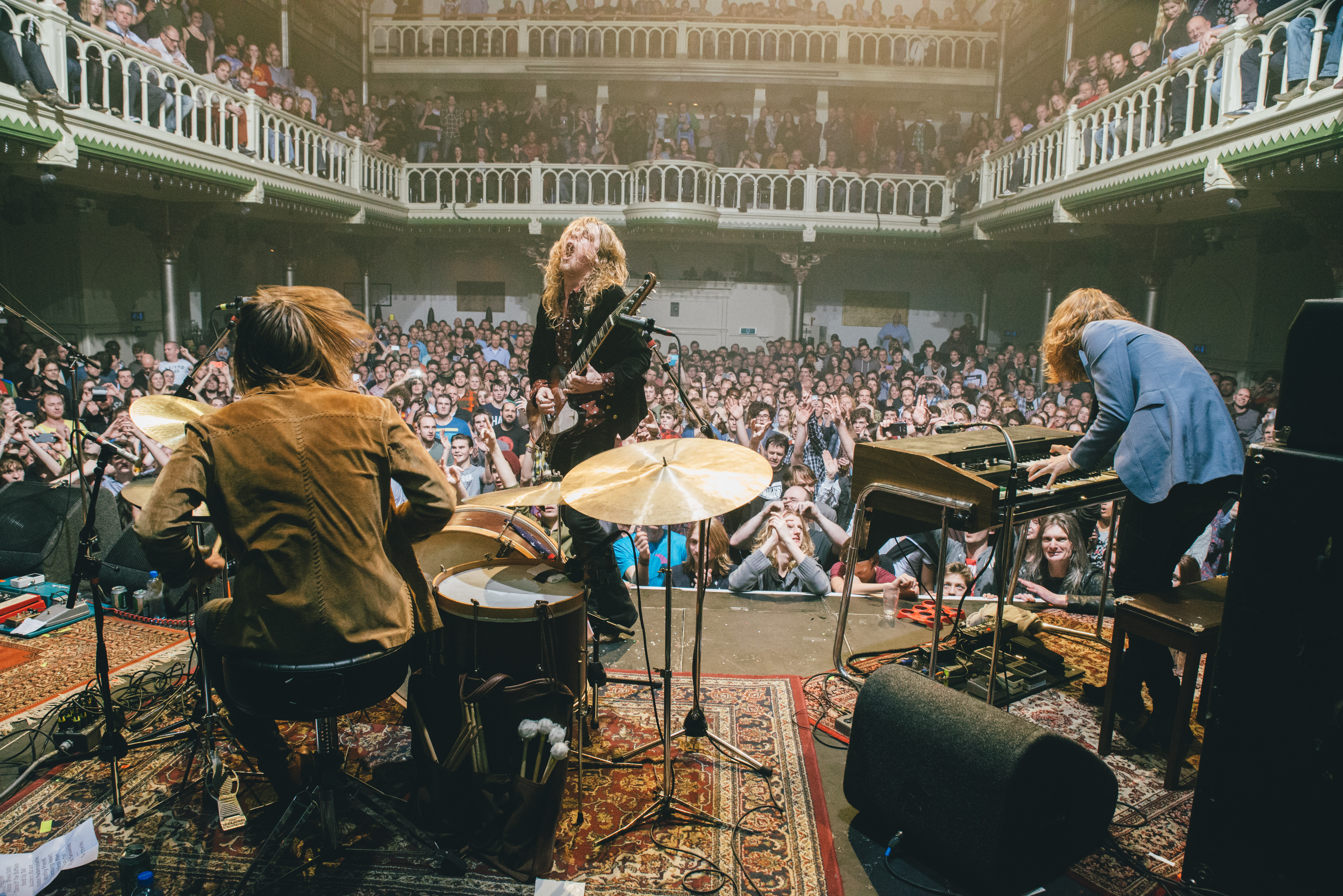
DeWolff performing at Paradiso

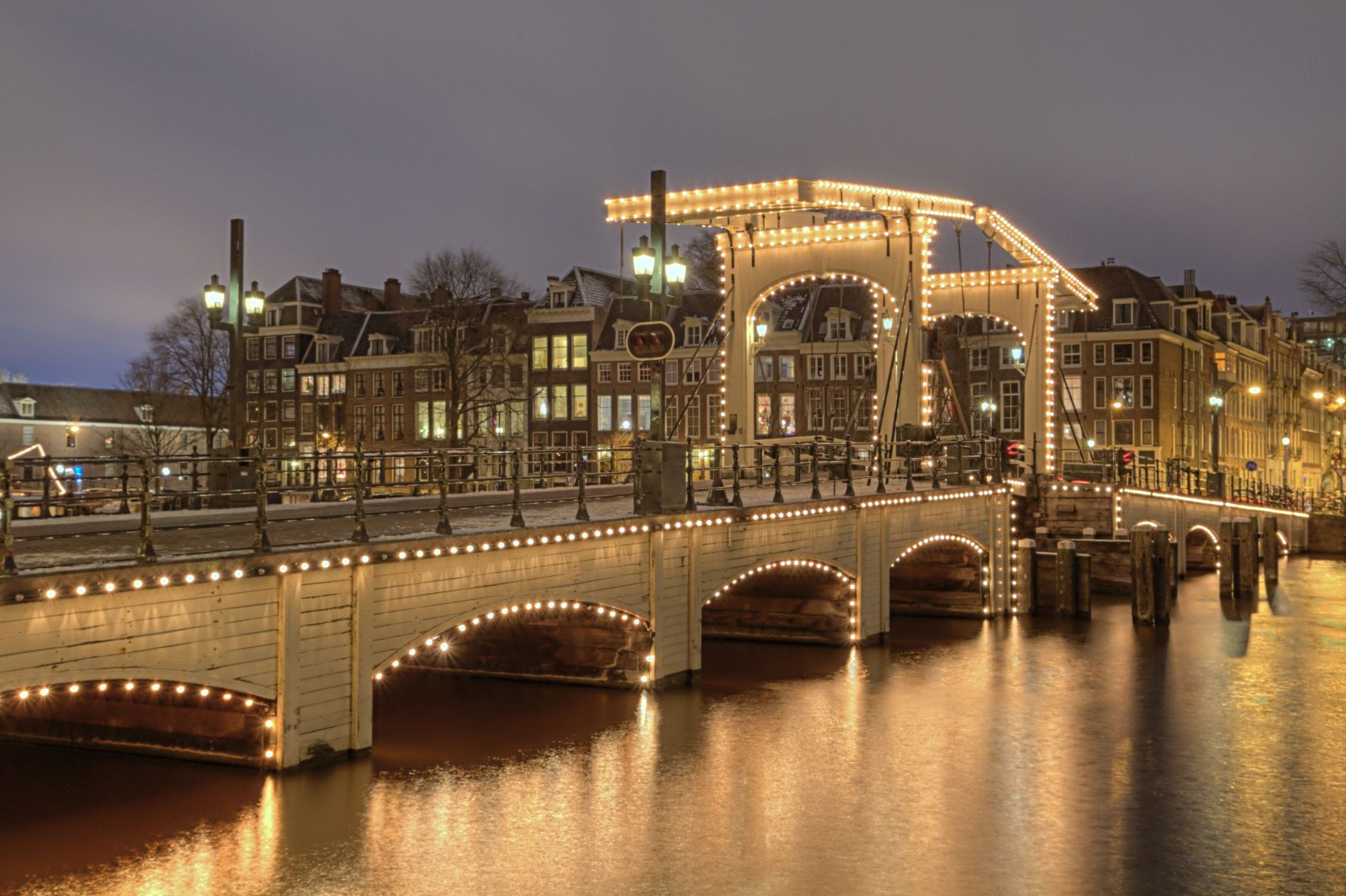
The Magere Brug or "Skinny Bridge" over the Amstel at night

Amsterdam is famous for its vibrant and diverse nightlife. Amsterdam has many cafés (bars). They range from large and modern to small and cosy. The typical Bruine Kroeg (brown café) breathes a more old-fashioned atmosphere with dimmed lights, candles, and somewhat older clientele. These brown cafés mostly offer a wide range of local and international artisanal beers. Most cafés have terraces in summertime. A common sight on the Leidseplein during summer is a square full of terraces packed with people drinking beer or wine. Many restaurants can be found in Amsterdam as well. Since Amsterdam is a multicultural city, a lot of different ethnic restaurants can be found. Restaurants range from being rather luxurious and expensive to being ordinary and affordable. Amsterdam also possesses many discothèques. The two main nightlife areas for tourists are the Leidseplein and the Rembrandtplein. The Paradiso, Melkweg and Sugar Factory are cultural centres, which turn into discothèques on some nights.

=== Festivals ===
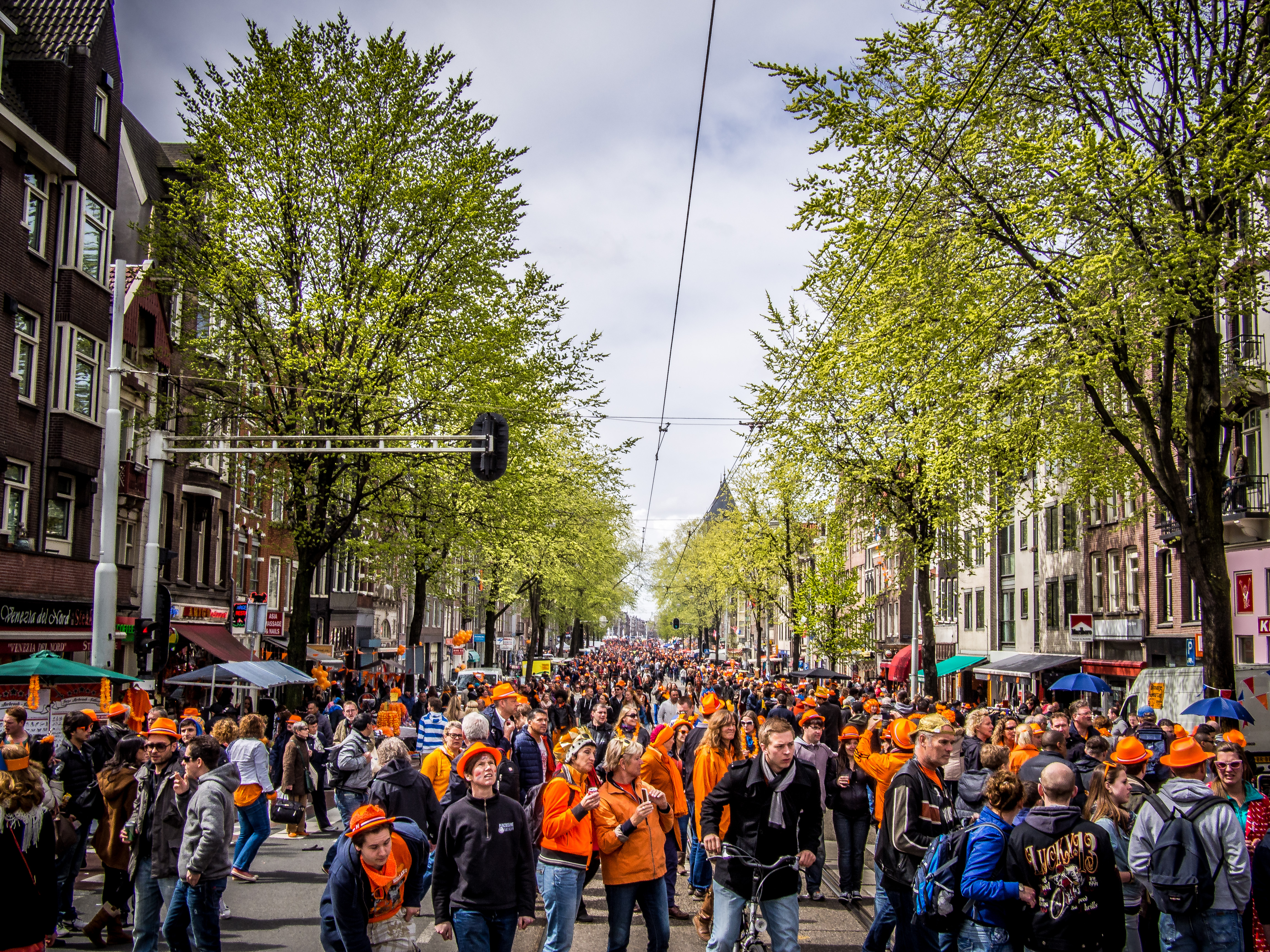
Queen's Day in Amsterdam in 2013

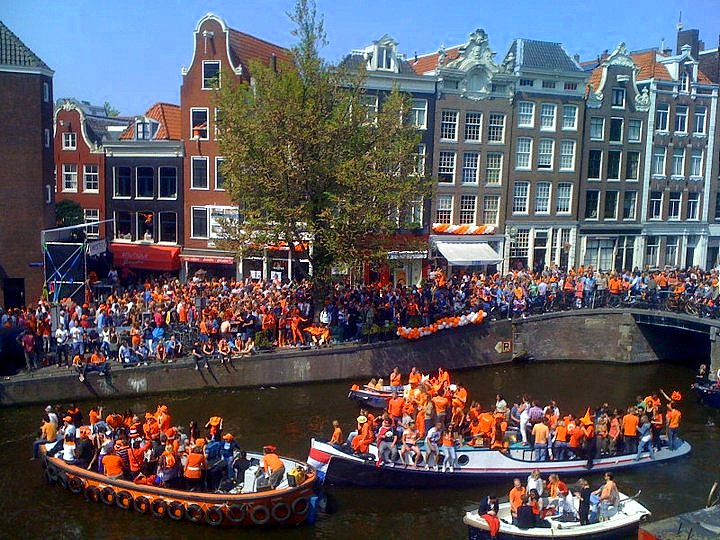
People dressed in orange on the canals of Amsterdam in 2010 during Koningsdag or King's Day

In 2008, there were 140 festivals and events in Amsterdam. During the same year, Amsterdam was designated as the World Book Capital for one year by UNESCO.

Famous festivals and events in Amsterdam include: Koningsdag (which was named Koninginnedag until the crowning of King Willem-Alexander in 2013) (King's Day – Queen's Day); the Holland Festival for the performing arts; the yearly Prinsengrachtconcert (classical concerto on the Prinsen canal) in August; the 'Stille Omgang' (a silent Roman Catholic evening procession held every March); Amsterdam Gay Pride; The Cannabis Cup; and the Uitmarkt. On Koningsdag—which is held each year on 27 April—hundreds of thousands of people travel to Amsterdam to celebrate with the city's residents. The entire city becomes overcrowded with people buying products from the free market, or visiting one of the many music concerts.

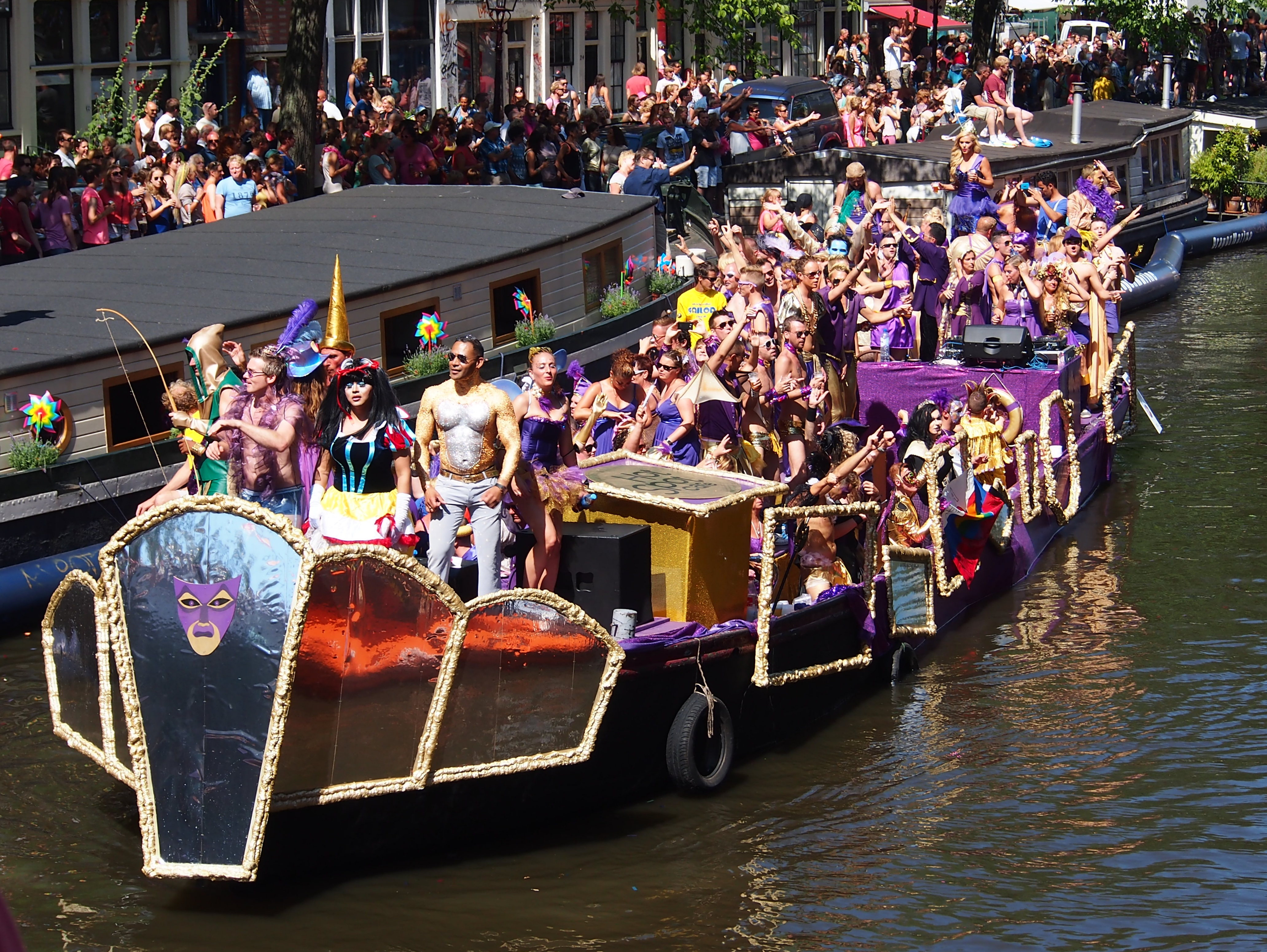
One of the decorated boats participating in the 2013 Canal Parade of the Amsterdam Gay Pride

The yearly Holland Festival attracts international artists and visitors from all over Europe. Amsterdam Gay Pride is a yearly local LGBT parade of boats in Amsterdam's canals, held on the first Saturday in August. The annual Uitmarkt is a three-day cultural event at the start of the cultural season in late August. It offers previews of many different artists, such as musicians and poets, who perform on podia.

== Sports ==
Amsterdam is home of the Eredivisie football club AFC Ajax. The stadium Johan Cruyff Arena is the home of Ajax. It is located in the south-east of the city next to the new Amsterdam Bijlmer ArenA railway station. Before moving to their current location in 1996, Ajax played their regular matches in the now demolished De Meer Stadion in the eastern part of the city or in the Olympic Stadium. In 1928, Amsterdam hosted the Summer Olympics. The Olympic Stadium built for the occasion has been completely restored and is now used for cultural and sporting events, such as the Amsterdam Marathon. In 1920, Amsterdam assisted in hosting some of the sailing events for the Summer Olympics held in neighbouring Antwerp, Belgium by hosting events at Buiten IJ. They had also made a bid to host the 1952 and 1992 Summer Olympics but lost to Helsinki and Barcelona.

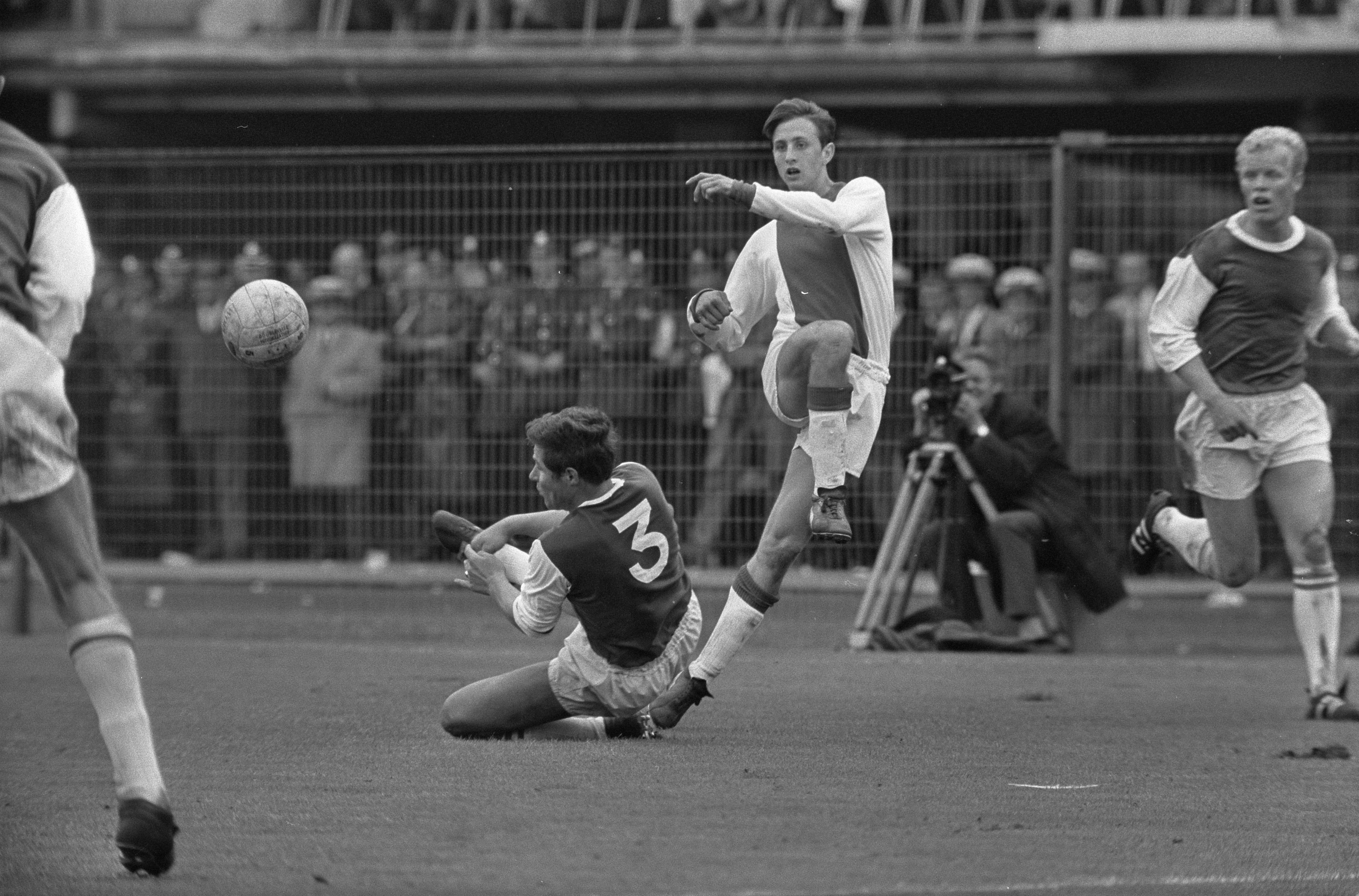
AFC Ajax player Johan Cruyff, 1967

The city holds the Dam to Dam Run, a 16 km (10 mi) race from Amsterdam to Zaandam, as well as the Amsterdam Marathon. The ice hockey team Amstel Tijgers plays in the Jaap Eden ice rink. The team competes in the Dutch Ice Hockey Premier League. Speed skating championships have been held on the 400-meter lane of this ice rink.

Amsterdam holds two American football franchises: the Amsterdam Crusaders and the Amsterdam Panthers. The Amsterdam Pirates baseball team competes in the Dutch Major League. There are three field hockey teams: Amsterdam, Pinoké, and Hurley, who play their matches around the Wagener Stadium in the nearby city of Amstelveen. The basketball team MyGuide Amsterdam competes in the Dutch premier division and play their games in the Sporthallen Zuid.

There is one rugby club in Amsterdam, which also hosts sports training classes such as RTC (Rugby Talenten Centrum or Rugby Talent Centre) and the National Rugby Stadium.

Since 1999, the city of Amsterdam honours the best sportsmen and women at the Amsterdam Sports Awards. Boxer Raymond Joval and field hockey midfielder Carole Thate were the first to receive the awards, in 1999.

Amsterdam hosted the World Gymnaestrada in 1991 and again in 2023.

== Politics ==
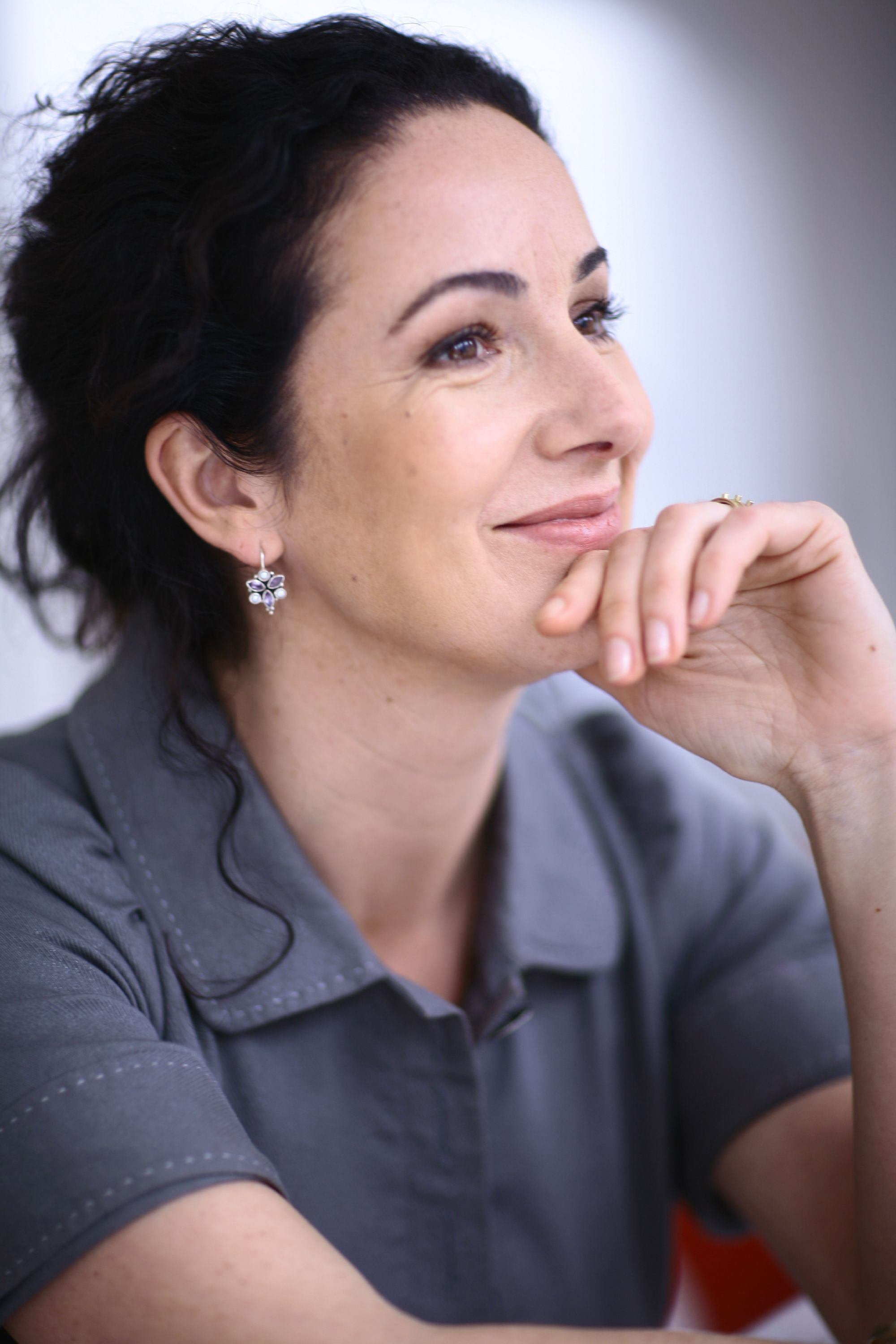
Femke Halsema has been the Mayor of Amsterdam since 2018.

The city of Amsterdam is a municipality under the Dutch Municipalities Act. It is governed by a directly elected municipal council, a municipal executive, and a mayor. Since 1981, the municipality of Amsterdam has gradually been divided into semi-autonomous boroughs, called stadsdelen or 'districts'. Over time, a total of 15 boroughs were created. In May 2010, under a major reform, the number of Amsterdam boroughs was reduced to eight: Amsterdam-Centrum covering the city centre including the canal belt, Amsterdam-Noord consisting of the neighbourhoods north of the IJ lake, Amsterdam-Oost in the east, Amsterdam-Zuid in the south, Amsterdam-West in the west, Amsterdam Nieuw-West in the far west, Amsterdam Zuidoost in the southeast, and Westpoort covering the Port of Amsterdam area.

=== City government ===
As with all Dutch municipalities, Amsterdam is governed by a directly elected municipal council, a municipal executive and a government appointed mayor (burgemeester). The mayor is a member of the municipal executive board but also has individual responsibilities in maintaining public order. On 27 June 2018, Femke Halsema (former member of House of Representatives for GroenLinks from 1998 to 2011) was appointed as the first woman to be Mayor of Amsterdam by the King's Commissioner of North Holland for a six-year term after being nominated by the Amsterdam municipal council and began serving a six-year term on 12 July 2018. She replaces Eberhard van der Laan (Labour Party) who was the Mayor of Amsterdam from 2010 until his death in October 2017. After the 2014 municipal council elections, a governing majority of D66, VVD and SP was formed – the first coalition without the Labour Party since World War II. Next to the mayor, the municipal executive consists of eight wethouders ('alderpersons') appointed by the municipal council: four D66 alderpersons, two VVD alderpersons and two SP alderpersons.

On 18 September 2017, it was announced by Eberhard van der Laan in an open letter to Amsterdam citizens that Kajsa Ollongren would take up his office as acting Mayor of Amsterdam with immediate effect due to ill health. Ollongren was succeeded as acting Mayor by Eric van der Burg on 26 October 2017 and by Jozias van Aartsen on 4 December 2017.

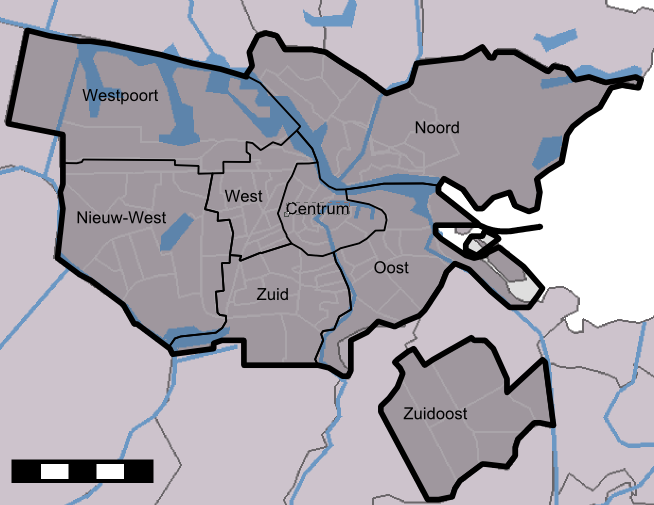
Boroughs of Amsterdam until 24 March 2022

Unlike most other Dutch municipalities, Amsterdam is subdivided into seven boroughs, called stadsdelen or 'districts', and the urban area of Weesp. This system was gradually implemented in the 1980s to improve local governance. The boroughs are responsible for many activities that had previously been run by the central city. Before the 2010 reform, the number of Amsterdam boroughs had reached fifteen. Fourteen of those had their own district council (deelraad), elected by a popular vote. The fifteenth, Westpoort, covers the harbour of Amsterdam and has very few residents. Therefore, it was governed by the central municipal council.

Under the borough system, municipal decisions are made at the borough level, except for those affairs on the whole city such as major infrastructure projects, which are the jurisdiction of the central municipal authorities. In 2010, the borough system was restructured, in which many smaller boroughs merged into larger boroughs. In 2014, under a reform of the Dutch Municipalities Act, the Amsterdam boroughs lost much of their autonomous status, as their district councils were abolished.

The municipal council of Amsterdam voted to maintain the borough system by replacing the district councils with smaller, but still directly elected district committees (bestuurscommissies). Under a municipal ordinance, the new district committees were granted responsibilities through the delegation of regulatory and executive powers by the central municipal council.

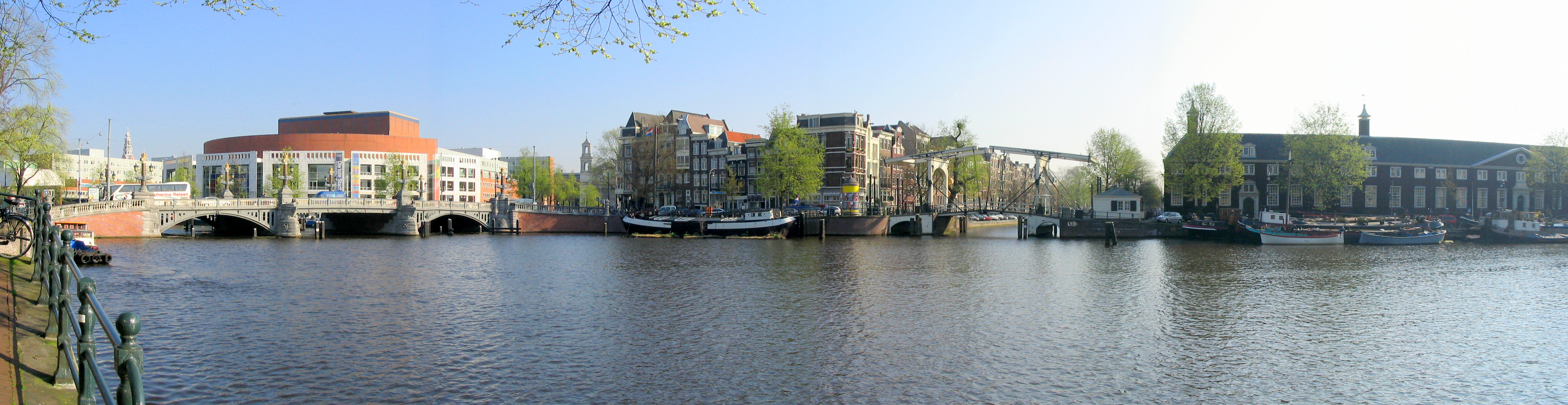
View of the Stopera (left), behind the Blauwbrug (blue bridge), where the Amsterdam city hall and opera house are located, and the H'ART Museum (right) on the Amstel

=== Metropolitan area ===
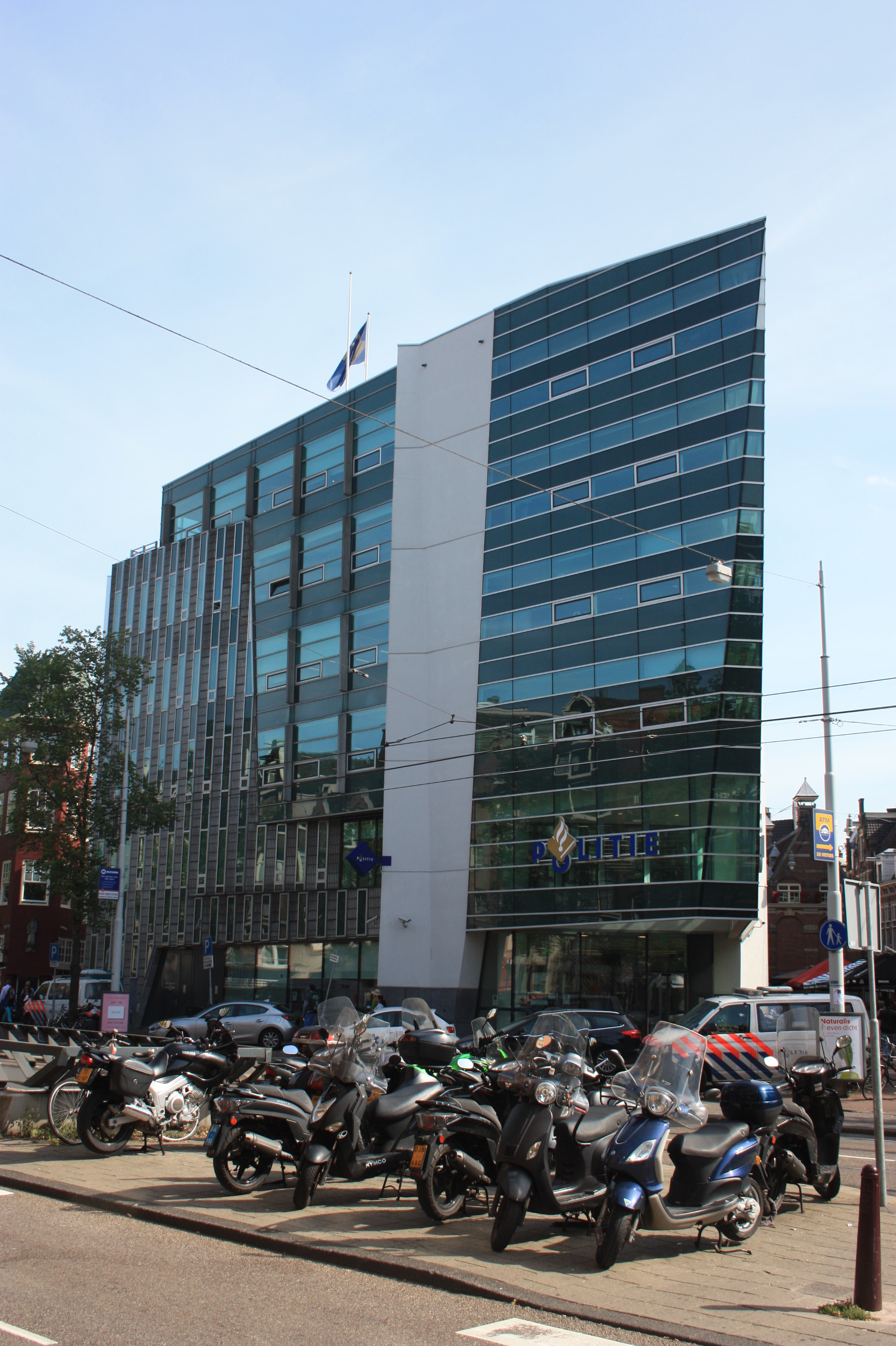
Police headquarters of Amsterdam

"Amsterdam" is usually understood to refer to the municipality of Amsterdam. Colloquially, some areas within the municipality, such as the town of Durgerdam, may not be considered part of Amsterdam.

Statistics Netherlands uses three other definitions of Amsterdam: metropolitan agglomeration Amsterdam (Grootstedelijke Agglomeratie Amsterdam, not to be confused with Grootstedelijk Gebied Amsterdam, a synonym of Groot Amsterdam), Greater Amsterdam (Groot Amsterdam, a COROP region) and the urban region Amsterdam (Stadsgewest Amsterdam). The Amsterdam Department for Research and Statistics uses a fourth conurbation, namely the Stadsregio Amsterdam ('City Region of Amsterdam'). The city region is similar to Greater Amsterdam but includes the municipalities of Zaanstad and Wormerland.

The smallest of these areas is the municipality of Amsterdam with a population of about 870,000 in 2021. The larger conurbation had a population of over one million. It includes the municipalities of Zaanstad, Wormerland, Oostzaan, Diemen, and Amstelveen only, as well as the municipality of Amsterdam. Greater Amsterdam includes 15 municipalities and had a population of 1,400,000 in 2021. Though much larger in area, the population of this area is only slightly larger, because the definition excludes the relatively populous municipality of Zaanstad. The largest area by population, the Metropolitan Region Amsterdam (Dutch: Metropoolregio Amsterdam), had a population of 2.33 million in 2013. It includes for instance Zaanstad, Wormerland, Muiden, Abcoude, Haarlem, Almere and Lelystad but excludes Graft-De Rijp. Amsterdam is part of the conglomerate metropolitan area Randstad, with a total population of 6,659,300 inhabitants in 2008.

Of these various metropolitan area configurations, only the Stadsregio Amsterdam (City Region of Amsterdam) has a formal governmental status. Its responsibilities include regional spatial planning and metropolitan public transport concessions.

=== National capital ===
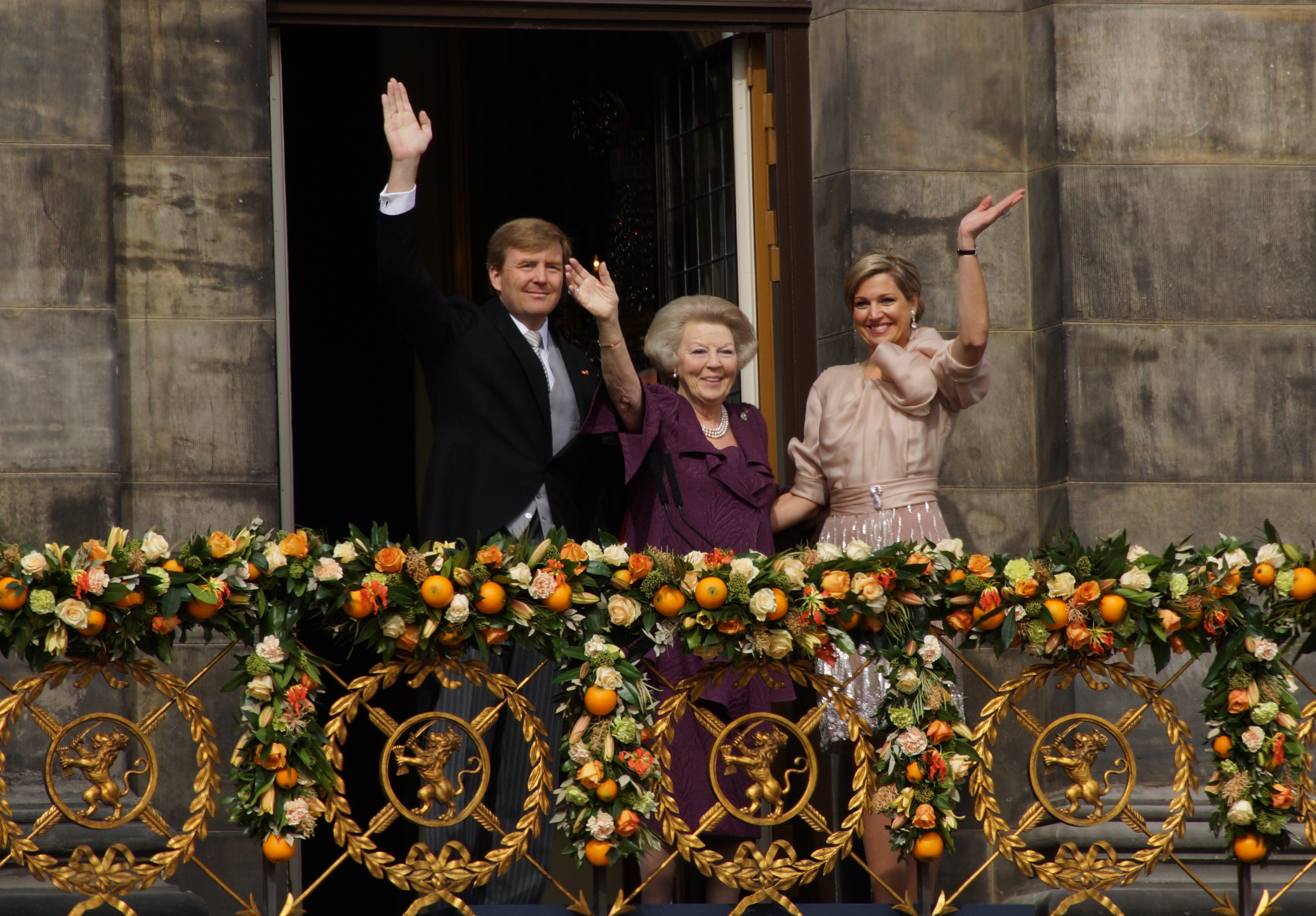
King Willem-Alexander, Princess Beatrix, and Queen Máxima greeting Amsterdammers from the Royal Palace of Amsterdam during Willem-Alexanders inauguration in 2013

Under the Dutch Constitution, Amsterdam is the capital of the Netherlands. Since the 1983 constitutional revision, the constitution mentions "Amsterdam" and "capital" in chapter 2, article 32: The king's confirmation by oath and his coronation take place in "the capital Amsterdam" ("de hoofdstad Amsterdam"). Previous versions of the constitution only mentioned "the city of Amsterdam" ("de stad Amsterdam"). For a royal investiture, therefore, the States General of the Netherlands (the Dutch Parliament) meets for a ceremonial joint session in Amsterdam. The ceremony traditionally takes place at the Nieuwe Kerk on Dam Square, immediately after the former monarch has signed the act of abdication at the nearby Royal Palace of Amsterdam. Normally, however, the Parliament sits in The Hague, the city which has historically been the seat of the Dutch government, the Dutch monarchy, and the Dutch supreme court. Foreign embassies are also located in The Hague.

=== Symbols ===
The coat of arms of Amsterdam is composed of several historical elements. First and centre are three St Andrew's crosses, aligned in a vertical band on the city's shield (although Amsterdam's patron saint was Saint Nicholas). These St Andrew's crosses can also be found on the city shields of neighbours Amstelveen and Ouder-Amstel. This part of the coat of arms is the basis of the flag of Amsterdam, flown by the city government, but also as civil ensign for ships registered in Amsterdam. Second is the Imperial Crown of Austria. In 1489, out of gratitude for services and loans, Maximilian I awarded Amsterdam the right to adorn its coat of arms with the king's crown. Then, in 1508, this was replaced with Maximilian's imperial crown when he was crowned Holy Roman Emperor. In the early years of the 17th century, Maximilian's crown in Amsterdam's coat of arms was again replaced, this time with the crown of Emperor Rudolph II, a crown that became the Imperial Crown of Austria. The lions date from the late 16th century, when the city and province became part of the Republic of the Seven United Netherlands. Last came the city's official motto: Heldhaftig, Vastberaden, Barmhartig ("Heroic, Determined, Merciful"), bestowed on the city in 1947 by Queen Wilhelmina, in recognition of the city's bravery during the Second World War.

== Transport ==
=== Metro, tram and bus ===
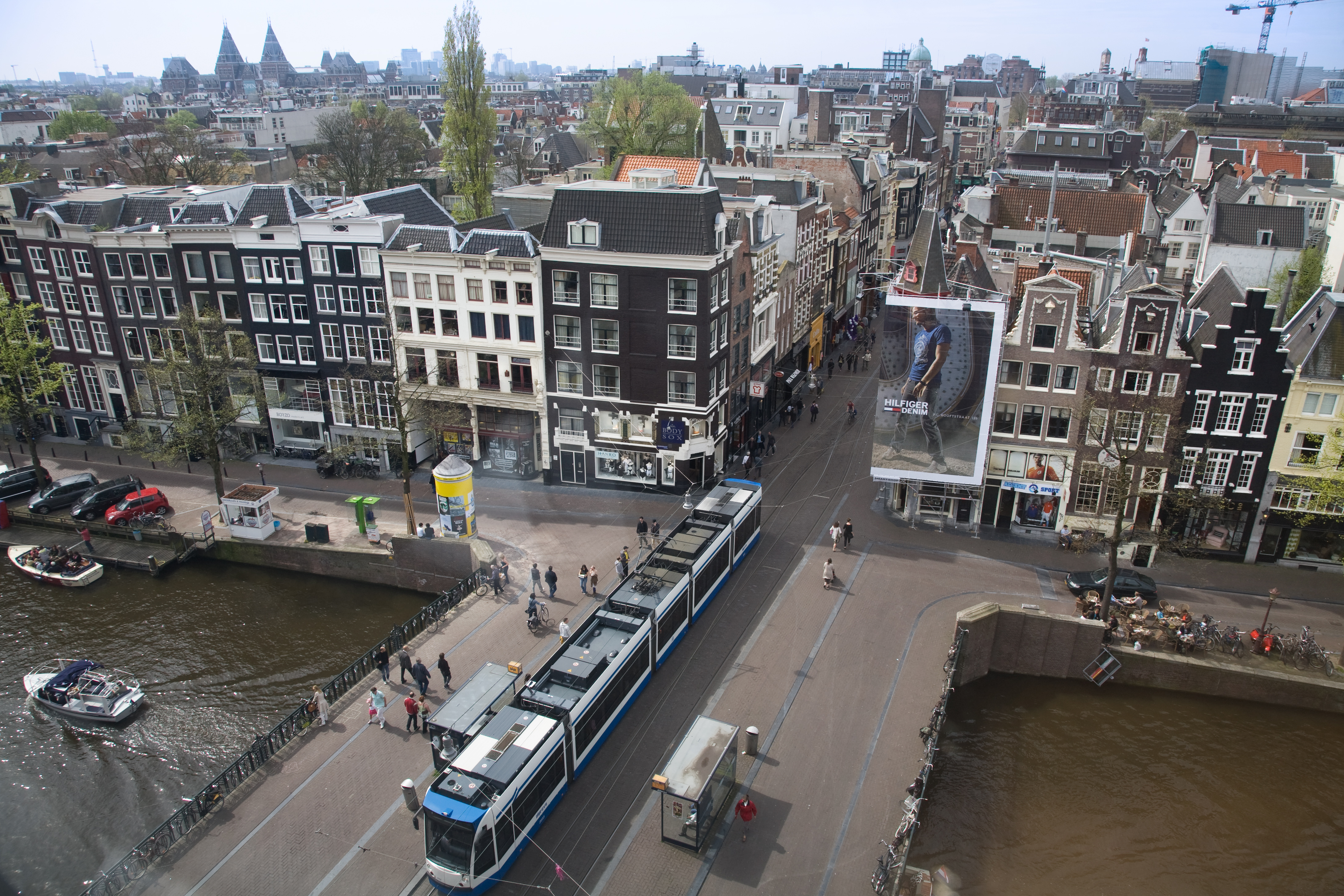
A tram crossing the Keizersgracht

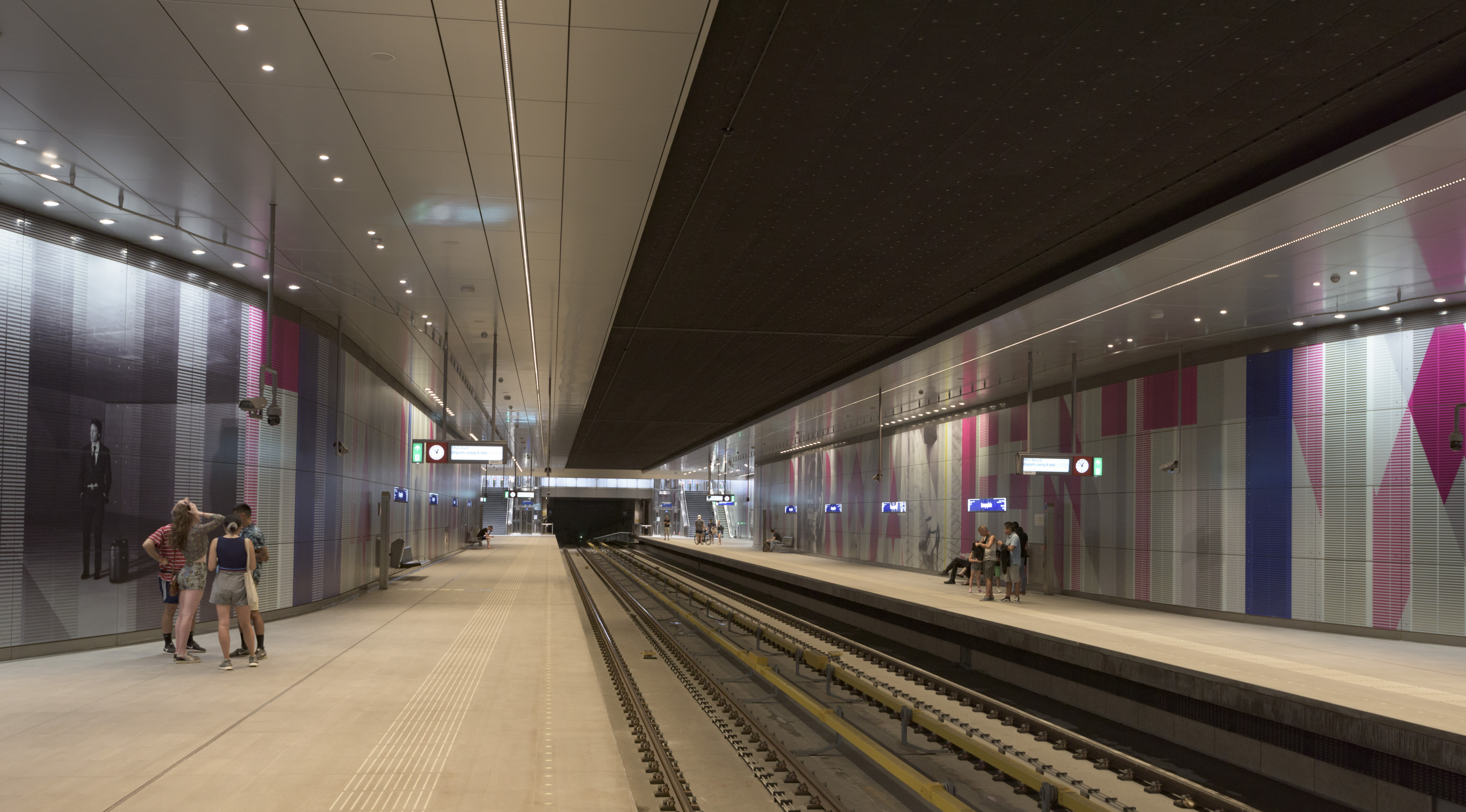
The Amsterdam Metro is a mixed subway and above ground rapid transit system consisting of five lines.

Currently, there are sixteen tram routes and five metro routes. All are operated by the municipal public transport operator GVB, which also runs the city bus network.

Four fare-free GVB ferries carry pedestrians and cyclists across the IJ lake to the borough of Amsterdam-Noord, and two fare-charging ferries run east and west along the harbour. There are also privately operated water taxis, a water bus, a boat-sharing operation, electric rental boats, and canal cruises, that transport people along Amsterdam's waterways.

Regional buses, and some suburban buses, are operated by Connexxion and EBS. International coach services are provided by FlixBus and BlaBlaCar Bus.

To facilitate easier transport to the centre of Amsterdam, the city has various P+R Locations where people can park their car at an affordable price and transfer to one of the numerous public transport lines.

=== Car ===
Amsterdam was intended in 1932 to be the hub, a kind of Kilometre Zero, of the highway system of the Netherlands, with freeways numbered One to Eight planned to originate from the city. The outbreak of the Second World War and shifting priorities led to the current situation, where only roads A1, A2, and A4 originate from Amsterdam according to the original plan. The A3 to Rotterdam was cancelled in 1970 to conserve the Groene Hart. Road A8, leading north to Zaandam and the A10 Ringroad were opened between 1968 and 1974. Besides the A1, A2, A4 and A8, several freeways, such as the A7 and A6, carry traffic mainly bound for Amsterdam.

The A10 ringroad surrounding the city connects Amsterdam with the Dutch national network of freeways. Interchanges on the A10 allow cars to enter the city by transferring to one of the 18 city roads, numbered S101 through to S118. These city roads are regional roads without grade separation, and sometimes without a central reservation. Most are accessible by cyclists. The S100 Centrumring is a smaller ring road circumnavigating the city's centre.

In the city centre, driving a car is discouraged. Parking fees are expensive, and many streets are closed to cars or are one-way. The local government sponsors carsharing and carpooling initiatives such as Autodelen and Meerijden.nu. The local government has also started removing parking spaces in the city in 2019, with the goal of removing 10,000 spaces (roughly 1,500 per year) by 2025.

=== National rail ===
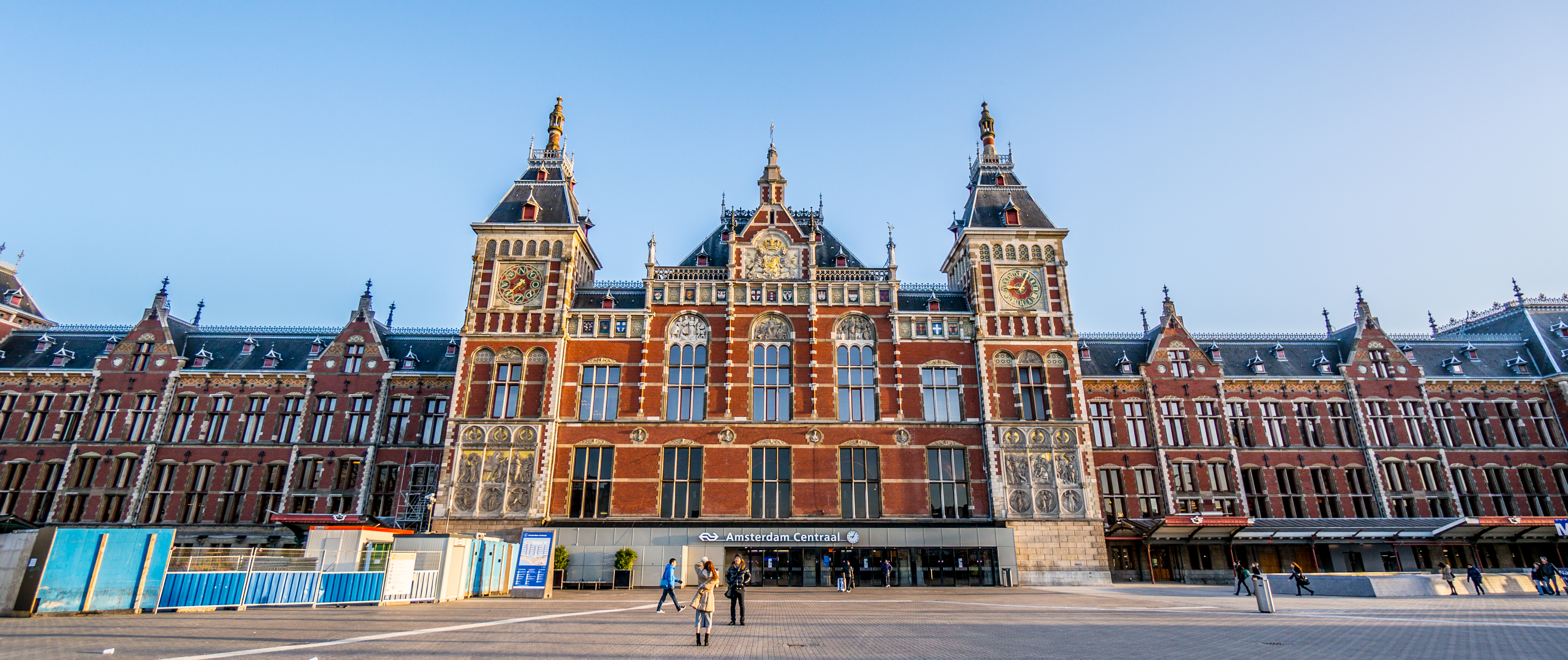
Amsterdam Centraal station, the city's main train station

Amsterdam is served by ten stations of the Nederlandse Spoorwegen (Dutch Railways). Five are intercity stops: Sloterdijk, Zuid, Amstel, Bijlmer ArenA and Amsterdam Centraal. The stations for local services are: Lelylaan, RAI, Holendrecht, Muiderpoort and Science Park. Amsterdam Centraal and Zuid are also international railway stations. From these stations, there are regular services to destinations such as Austria, Belgium, Czech Republic, France, Germany, Switzerland and the United Kingdom. Among these trains are international trains of the Nederlandse Spoorwegen and Deutsche Bahn to Berlin, Eurostar services to Antwerp, Brussels, Paris and London and ICE services to Cologne and Frankfurt.

=== Airport ===
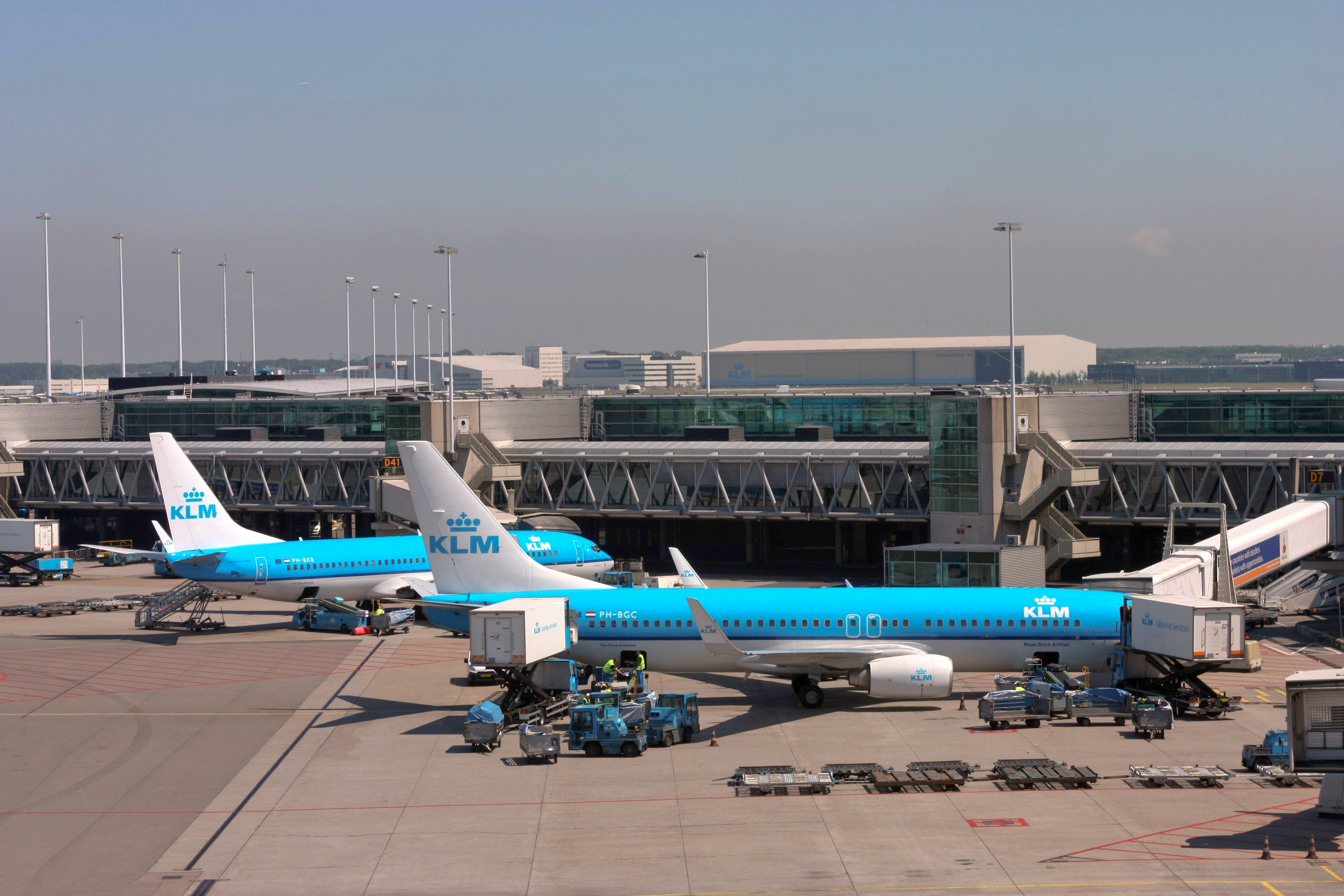
Amsterdam Airport Schiphol ranks as Europe's third-busiest airport for passenger traffic.

Amsterdam Airport Schiphol is less than 20 minutes by train from Amsterdam Centraal station and is served by domestic and international intercity trains, such as Eurostar and EuroCity. Schiphol is the largest airport in the Netherlands, the third-largest in Europe, and the 14th-largest in the world in terms of passengers. It handles over 68 million passengers per year and is the home base of KLM and Transavia. As of 2014, Schiphol was the fifth busiest airport in the world measured by international passenger numbers. This airport is 4 meters below sea level. Although Schiphol is internationally known as Amsterdam Schiphol Airport it lies in the neighbouring municipality of Haarlemmermeer, southwest of the city.

Rotterdam The Hague Airport, a smaller international airport, is also within an hour's drive of the city.

=== Cycling ===
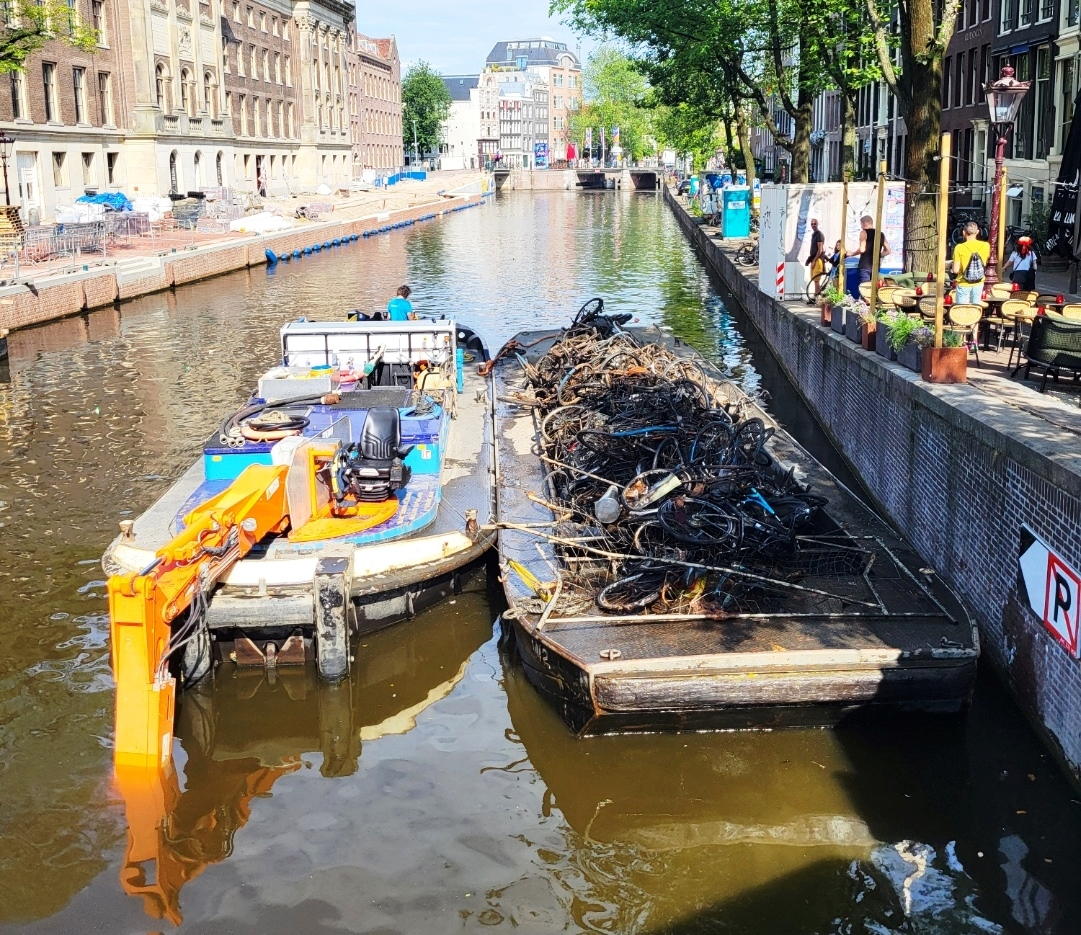
Barges regularly pull bicycles from the bottom of the canals in Amsterdam. Many residents discard old bicycles by throwing them into the canals.

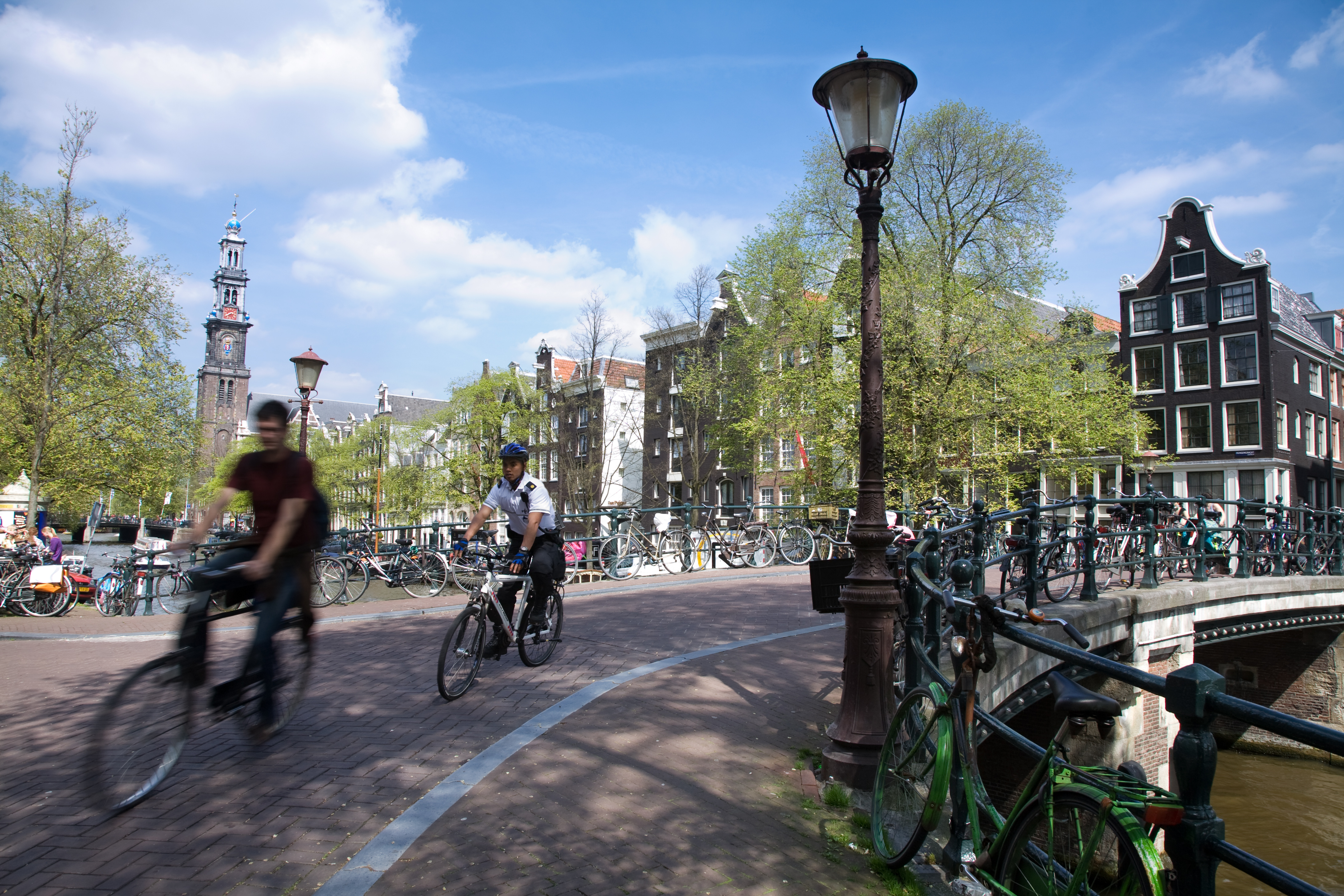
Police bicyclist crossing a bridge over the Prinsengracht

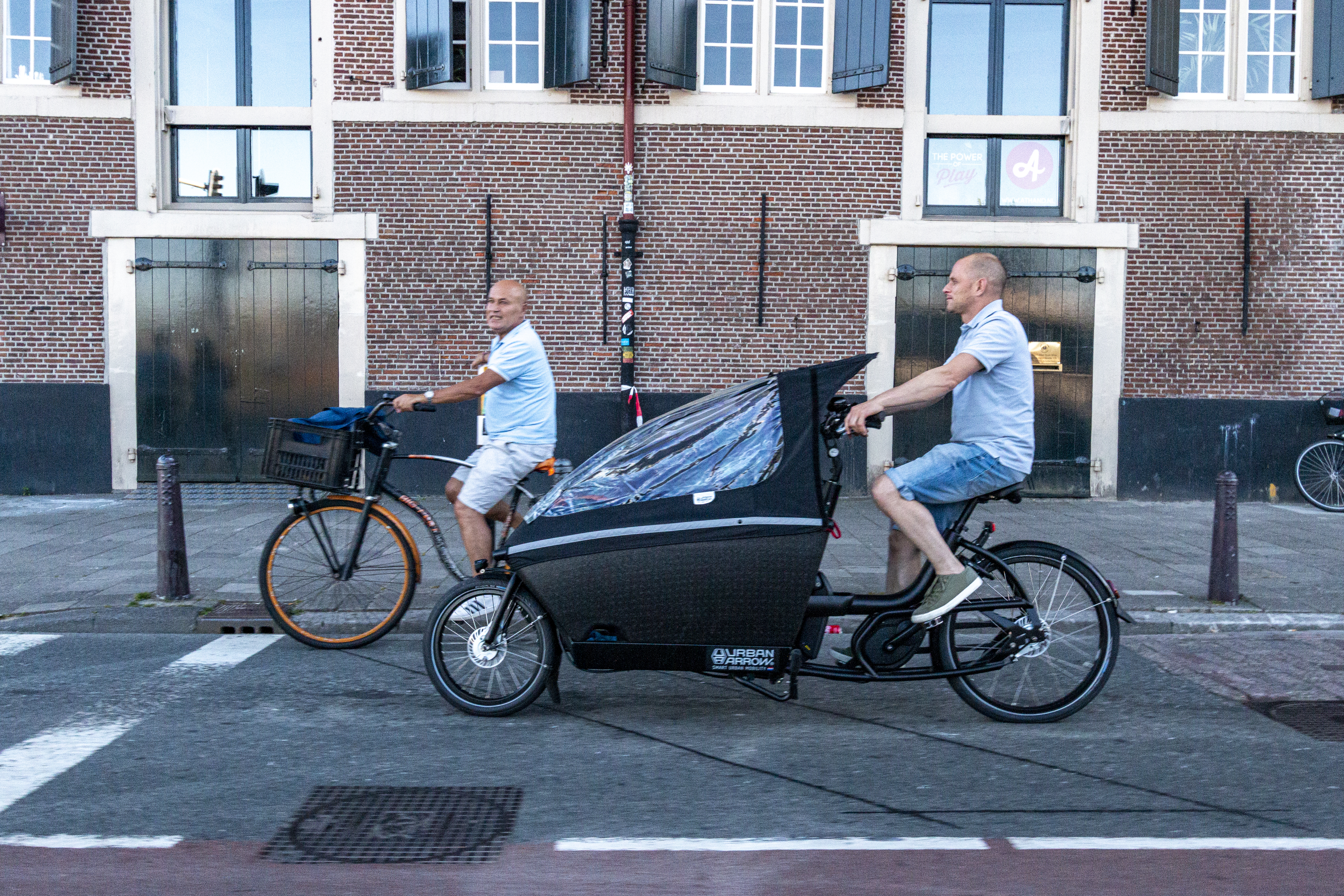
Bicyclist at Amsterdam

Amsterdam is one of the most bicycle-friendly large cities in the world and is a centre of bicycle culture with facilities for cyclists such as bike paths and bike racks, and several guarded bike storage garages (fietsenstalling) which can be used.

According to the most recent figures published by the Central Bureau of Statistics (CBS), in 2015 the 442,693 households (850,000 residents) in Amsterdam together owned 847,000 bicycles – 1.91 bicycles per household. Theft is widespread—in 2011, about 83,000 bicycles were stolen in Amsterdam. Bicycles are used by all socio-economic groups because of their convenience, Amsterdam's small size, the 400 km (249 mi) of bike paths, the flat terrain, and the inconvenience of driving an automobile.

== Education ==
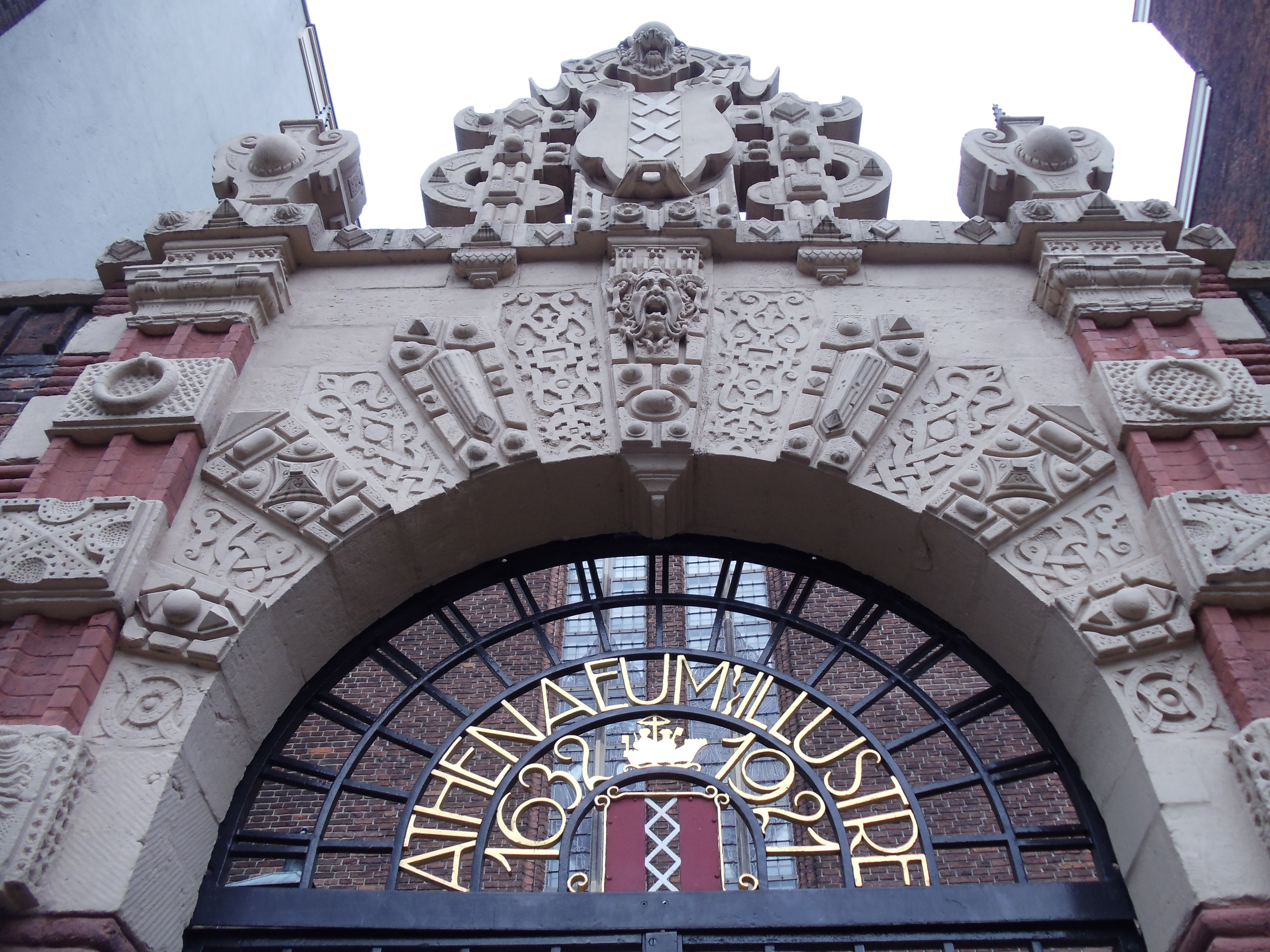
The Agnietenkapel Gate at the University of Amsterdam, founded in 1632 as the Athenaeum Illustre

Amsterdam has two universities: the University of Amsterdam (Universiteit van Amsterdam, UvA), and the Vrije Universiteit Amsterdam (VU). The University of Amsterdam is home to Room for Discussion, an independent interview platform that has welcomed a variety of prominent guests including Christine Lagarde, Mario Draghi, Charles Michel, Rob Bauer, and Sviatlana Tsikhanouskaya. Other institutions for higher education include an art school – Gerrit Rietveld Academie, a university of applied sciences – the Hogeschool van Amsterdam, and the Amsterdamse Hogeschool voor de Kunsten. Amsterdam's International Institute of Social History is one of the world's largest documentary and research institutions concerning social history, and especially the history of the labour movement. Amsterdam's Hortus Botanicus, founded in the early 17th century, is one of the oldest botanical gardens in the world, with many old and rare specimens, among them the coffee plant that served as the parent for the entire coffee culture in Central and South America.

There are over 200 primary schools in Amsterdam. Some of these primary schools base their teachings on particular pedagogic theories like the various Montessori schools. The biggest Montessori high school in Amsterdam is the Montessori Lyceum Amsterdam. Many schools, however, are based on religion. This used to be primarily Roman Catholicism and various Protestant denominations, but with the influx of Muslim immigrants, there has been a rise in the number of Islamic schools. Jewish schools can be found in the southern suburbs of Amsterdam.

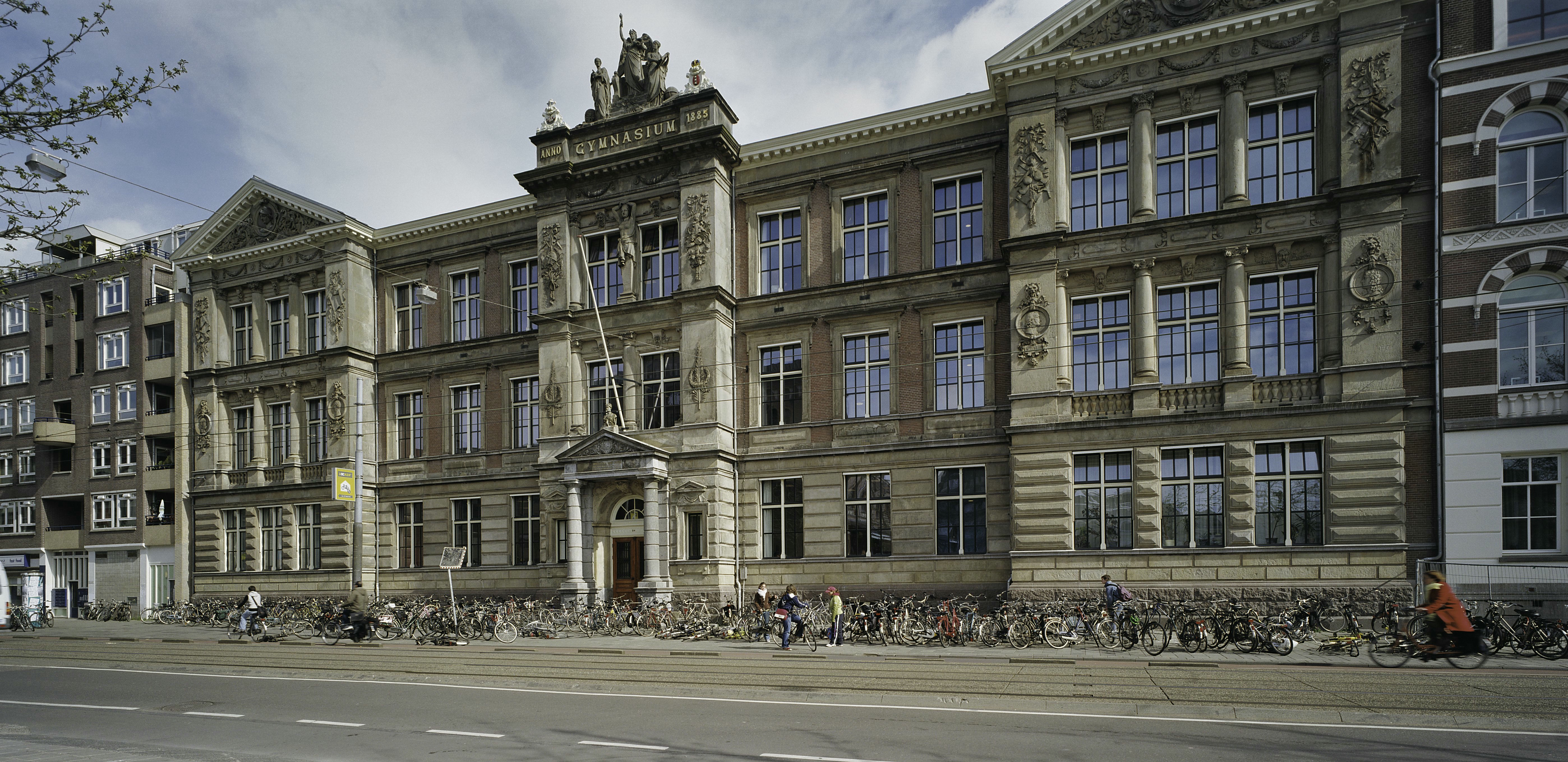
Barlaeus Gymnasium

Amsterdam is noted for having five independent grammar schools (Dutch: gymnasia), the Vossius Gymnasium, Barlaeus Gymnasium, St. Ignatius Gymnasium, Het 4e Gymnasium and the Cygnus Gymnasium where a classical curriculum including Latin and classical Greek is taught. Though believed until recently by many to be an anachronistic and elitist concept that would soon die out, the gymnasia have recently experienced a revival, leading to the formation of a fourth and fifth grammar school in which the three aforementioned schools participate. Most secondary schools in Amsterdam offer a variety of different levels of education in the same school. The city also has various colleges ranging from art and design to politics and economics which are mostly also available for students coming from other countries.

Schools for foreign nationals in Amsterdam include the Amsterdam International Community School, British School of Amsterdam, Albert Einstein International School Amsterdam, Lycée Vincent van Gogh La Haye-Amsterdam primary campus (French school), International School of Amsterdam, and the Japanese School of Amsterdam.

== Media ==
Amsterdam is a prominent centre for national and international media. Some locally based newspapers include Het Parool, a national daily paper; De Telegraaf, the largest Dutch daily newspaper; the daily newspapers Trouw, de Volkskrant and NRC; De Groene Amsterdammer, a weekly newspaper; the free newspapers Metro and The Holland Times (printed in English).

Amsterdam is home to the second-largest Dutch commercial TV group SBS Broadcasting Group, consisting of TV stations SBS6, Net5, and Veronica. However, Amsterdam is not considered 'the media city of the Netherlands'. The town of Hilversum, 30 km (19 mi) south-east of Amsterdam, has been crowned with this unofficial title. Hilversum is the principal centre for radio and television broadcasting in the Netherlands. Radio Netherlands, heard worldwide via shortwave radio since the 1920s, is also based there. Hilversum is home to an extensive complex of audio and television studios belonging to the national broadcast production company NOS, as well as to the studios and offices of all the Dutch public broadcasting organisations and many commercial TV production companies.

In 2012, the music video for "Live My Life" by Far East Movement was filmed in various parts of Amsterdam.

Several movies have been filmed in Amsterdam, including the James Bond film Diamonds Are Forever, Ocean's Twelve, Girl with a Pearl Earring, Kidnapping Mr. Heineken, Layer Cake and The Hitman's Bodyguard. Amsterdam is also featured in John Green's book The Fault in Our Stars, which was made into a film that also partly takes place in Amsterdam.

In 2003, the British drama series Bad Girls filmed scenes on location in Amsterdam. The scenes shows the male officers on a weekend trip in the red light district where they encounter escapee Shell Dockley and return her to the UK.

Amsterdam appears as a multiplayer map in Modern Warfare II under the name Breenbergh Hotel. Amsterdam also appears in Black Ops Cold War in an update, having players fight through the city.

== Housing ==
From the late 1960s onwards many buildings in Amsterdam have been squatted both for housing and for use as social centres. A number of these squats have legalised and become well known, such as OCCII, OT301, Paradiso and Vrankrijk.

== Sister cities ==
- Manchester, United Kingdom (2007)
- Zapopan, Mexico (2011)

== See also ==
- List of populated places in the Netherlands
- List of cities, towns and villages in North Holland
- List of cities in the Netherlands by province
- List of national capitals
- List of national capitals by latitude
- List of capital cities by elevation
- List of national capitals by population
- van Dam

== Notes ==
Preceded by Herning, Denmark (1987)	World Gymnaestrada host city 1991	Succeeded by Berlin, Germany (1995)
Preceded by Dornbirn, Austria (2019)	World Gymnaestrada host city 2023	Succeeded by TBA
