= Bloed, zweet en tranen =

2002 single by André Hazes

Single by André Hazes

from the album Strijdlustig
- Released: 2002
- Genre: Levenslied
- Length: 4:00
- Label: EMI Netherlands
- Songwriters: John van de Ven, André Hazes, Ton Leijten

André Hazes singles chronology
"Niet mee bemoeien" (2001)	"Bloed, zweet en tranen" (2002)	"You’ve lost that loving feeling" (2002)

"Bloed, zweet en tranen" (Dutch pronunciation: [blut ˈsʋeːt ɛn ˈtraːnə(n)]) is a song by André Hazes. It is the fifth track of his 2002 album Strijdlustig, it was released as the b-side to his single "Ik hou van jou" that same year. The song reached the Top 100 in the Netherlands, peaking at number 17. It is one of André Hazes's most popular songs. It was to be the last single that André Hazes would release under his own name, with the following single being his duet with Johnny Logan.

Having seen a little commercial success in 2002, the song has become an evergreen of sorts to supporters of the Netherlands national football team, and received heavy rotation during the FIFA 2010 World Cup amongst the supporters. Which is the reason the song began to chart again on Radio 2-Top 2000 in 2010. The song has also been played at the Amsterdam ArenA at home matches of AFC Ajax, the football club of André Hazes hometown Amsterdam, since its release in 2002. One of the highlights was when his son Dré Hazes Jr. performed the song on 15 May 2011 live at the ArenA, during the National Championship match between Ajax and FC Twente, the day Ajax clinched their 30th Eredivisie title.

== Listings ==
The single was on the Single Top 100 for six weeks peaking at #17. It however never received any notation in the Netherlands Top 40.

== Charts ==
=== Netherlands Single Top 100 ===
Hitlists: 07-09-2002 to 18-10-2002
Week:	1	2	3	4	5	6	
Position:	95	85	89	17	28	85	out

=== Radio 2 Top 2000 ===
Single in the Radio 2 Top 2000	'99	'00	'01	'02	'03	'04	'05	'06	'07	'08	'09	'10	'11	'12	'13	'14	'15	'16	'17	'18	'19	'20
Bloed, zweet en tranen	*	*	*	-	-	-	-	-	-	-	140	76	106	56	138	170	197	203	172	171	138	142

== René Froger version ==
"Bloed, zweet en tranen (Euro Cup version)"

Single by René Froger
- B-side: "'Bloed, zweet en tranen (Sing along version)'"
- Released: 30 May 2008
- Genre: Levenslied
- Length: 3:50
- Label: EMI Netherlands
- Songwriters: John van de Ven, Freek de Jonge, André Hazes, Ton Leijten

René Froger singles chronology
"Jij moet verder" (2008)	"Bloed, zweet en tranen (Euro Cup version)" (2008)	"De zon schijnt voor iedereen" (2008)

In 2008 René Froger sang the song once more at the hitparade in cooperation with the Dutch football association (KNVB) ahead of the UEFA Euro 2008.

== Chart performance ==
=== Netherlands Top 40 ===
Hitlists: 14-06-2008 to 05-07-2008
Week:	1	2	3	4	
Position:	28	11	13	22	out

=== Netherlands Single Top 100 ===
Hitlists: 07-06-2008 to 28-06-2008
Week:	1	2	3	4	
Position:	6	3	3	2	out
