= We gaan naar Londen =

Single by Willy Alberti en de Ajax Supporters
- B-side: "Een, twee, drie, vier"
- Released: 1971
- Genre: Levenslied
- Length: 2:13
- Label: CNR Music
- Songwriters: Harry de Groot, Cock Van Raayen, Ferry van Delden, A.H. Willemsen
- Producer: Bert Schouten

"We gaan naar Londen" (Dutch pronunciation: [ʋə ˈɣaːnaːr ˈlɔndə(n)]; English: We're going to London) is a Levenslied song by Willy Alberti sung with the Supporters of the Dutch association football club AFC Ajax from Amsterdam, which was released on CNR Music in 1971. The song is the A-side to the record "We gaan naar Londen / Een, twee, drie, vier" which was released as a 7"-single.

The song is a cover of We gaan naar Rome by Willy Derby (1934), with lyrics modified to fit Ajax' European Cup stint in 1971. The song was released prospectively regarding the 1971 European Cup Final which was contested at Wembley Stadium in London. Ajax defeated Panathinaikos F.C. from Athens, Greece 2–0 in the final, winning their first of three consecutive European championships.

Willy Alberti also released other records relating to his favorite football club Ajax throughout his career, having released the single "Ajax olé olé olé (je bent mijn glorie)" two years prior.

== Chart performance ==
=== Netherlands Top 40 ===
Hitlists: Week 20 1971 to Week 24 1971
Week:	1	2	3	4	
Position:	10	26	17	28	out

=== Netherlands Single Top 100 ===
Hitlists: 29-05-1971 to 05-06-1971
Week:	1	2	
Position:	24	20	out
