= Ajax (song) =

Single by Tante Leen
- B-side: "Ik krijg de kriebels"
- Released: 1969
- Genre: Levenslied
- Length: 3:04
- Label: Imperial

Tante Leen singles chronology
"Moeders mooiste" (1967)	"Ajax" (1969)	"Waar liefde woont" (1969)

"Ajax" is a Levenslied song by Tante Leen which was released on Imperial Records in 1969. It is dedicated to Tante Leen's hometown association football club AFC Ajax from Amsterdam. The song is the A-side to the record "Ajax / Ik krijg de kriebels" (English: I get the jitters) which was released as a 7"-single. The record features guest vocal by the men's choir "GETEA" under guidance of W. Rietveld. The song is one of many records Tante Leen has released and dedicated to her favorite football club throughout the span of her career.
