= Ajax Hup Hup Hup =

Single by Tante Leen
- B-side: "Mijn man is Ajaxied"
- Released: 1966
- Genre: Levenslied
- Label: His Master's Voice

Tante Leen singles chronology
"Als..." (1966)	"Ajax Hup Hup Hup" (1966)	"Kleine kinderen worden groot" (1967)

"Ajax Hup Hup Hup" is a Levenslied song by Tante Leen which was released on His Master's Voice in 1966. It is dedicated to Tante Leen's hometown association football club AFC Ajax from Amsterdam. The song is the A-side to the record "Ajax Hup Hup Hup / Mijn man is Ajaxied" which was released as a 7"-single. The song is the first of many records Tante Leen has released and dedicated to her favorite football club throughout the span of her career.

== Johnny Jordaan version ==
The song was re-released a year later, this time sung by her significant other Johnny Jordaan and featured on his album De zilvervloot of 1967.
