= Wij houden van Oranje =

1988 single by André Hazes

Single by André Hazes
- English title: We Love Orange
- B-side: "Wij houden van Oranje" (Instr.)
- Released: 1988
- Genre: Pop, schlager
- Length: 2:45
- Label: Philips
- Producer: Hans van Hemert

"Wij houden van Oranje" (Dutch pronunciation: [ʋə ˈɦʌudə(ɱ) vɑn oːˈrɑɲə]; stylized as "Wij ♥ Oranje"; transl. "We Love Orange") is a 1988 Dutch song and football chant performed by the Dutch levenslied singer André Hazes and produced by Hans van Hemert. It is based on the melody of the well-known Scottish song "Auld Lang Syne", written by Robert Burns. Orange is the colour of the Dutch royal family. André Hazes sang the song for the first time in 1988 during the European football championships. The Dutch football team sang along on Hazes' single.

André's "Wij houden van Oranje" peaked at No. 3 on the Dutch Top 40. Rapper Ali B recorded a cover version (featuring Hazes) that peaked at No. 2 on the same charts in 2006.
