= Ajax, Olé Olé Olé =

Single by Willy Alberti
- B-side: "Hoi, Hoi, Hoi, (Je bent mijn glorie)"
- Released: 12 May 1969
- Genre: Levenslied
- Length: 3:37
- Label: Philips Records
- Songwriters: G. Marco, J. De Leur
- Producer: Jack Bulterman

"Ajax, Olé Olé Olé" is a Levenslied song by Willy Alberti sung with the Supporters of the Dutch association football club AFC Ajax from Amsterdam who were credited as the Ajax choir. The single was released on Philips Records in 1969. The song is the A-side to the record "Ajax, Olé Olé Olé / Hoi, Hoi, Hoi, (Je bent mijn glorie)" which was released as a 7"-single.

Willy Alberti also released other records relating to his favorite football club Ajax throughout his career, having released the single "We gaan naar Londen" two years later.
