= Tante Leen =

Dutch singer

Helena Jansen-Polder
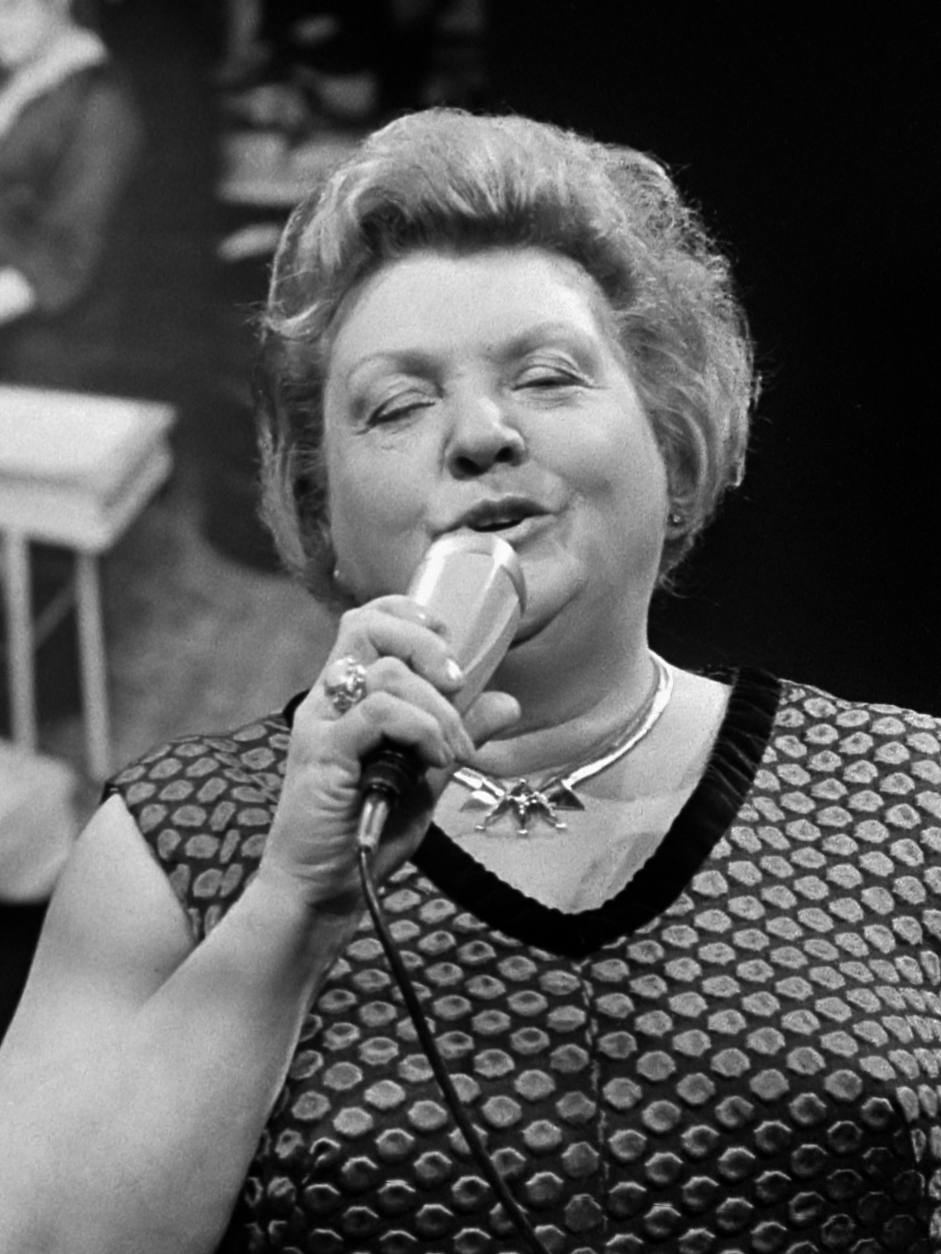
- Tante Leen in 1971
- Born: Helena Kok-Polder; 28 January 1912
- Died: 5 August 1992 (aged 80)
- Occupation: Singer
- Years active: –1975

Tante Leen (English: Auntie Leen, January 28, 1912 — August 5, 1992), real name Helena Kok-Polder, later Helena Jansen-Polder, was a Dutch folk singer from Amsterdam, Netherlands. Together with her friend and colleague Johnny Jordaan, the two together hold the title of "de Beste Stem van de Jordaan" (English: The best voice of the Jordaan).

== Career ==
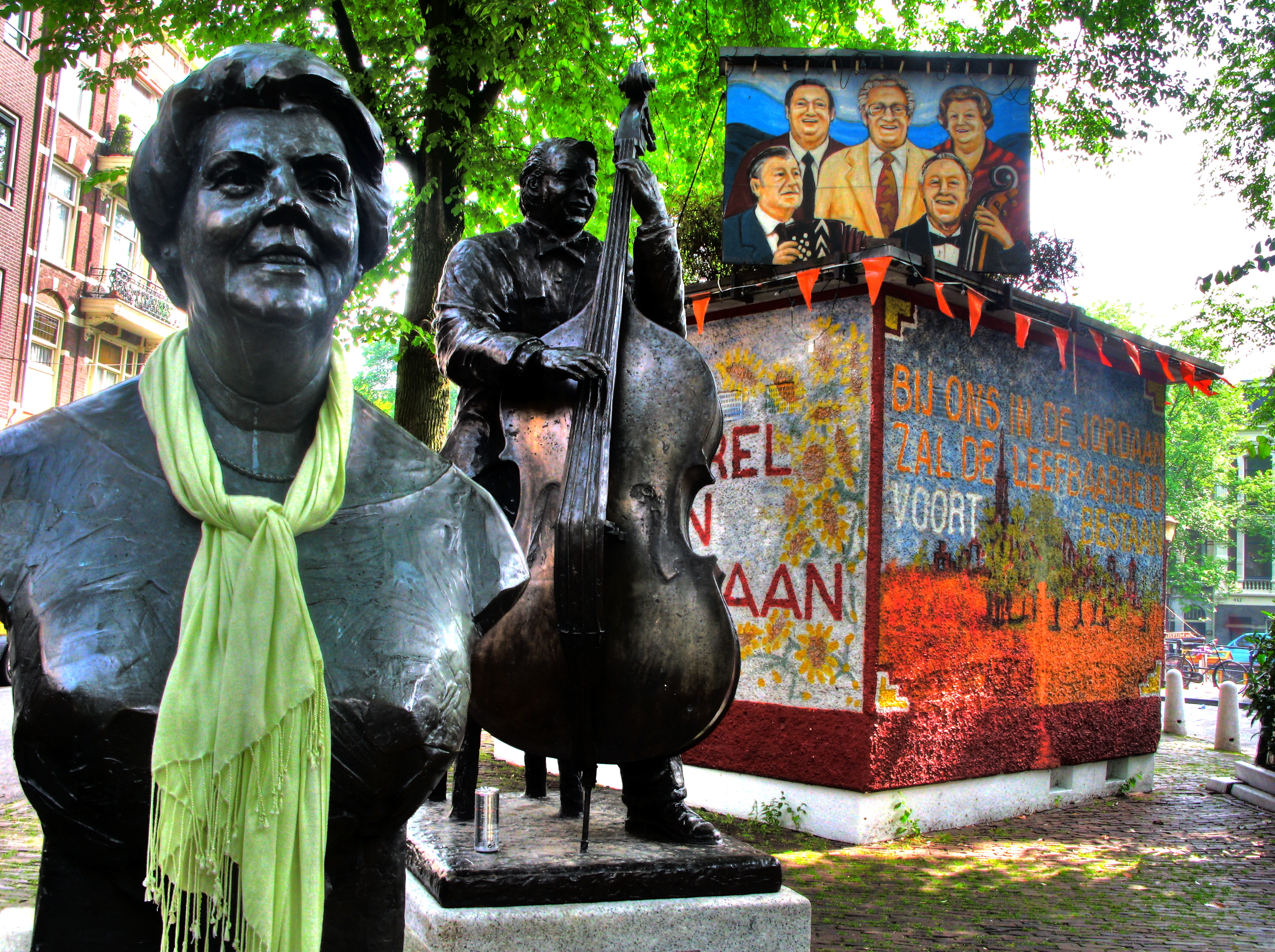
Bust of Tante Leen

Born 28 January 1912 in Amsterdam, Tante Leen didn't perform live until she was 43-years of age. Before that point she earned a living at cleaning and shrimp peeling. Regular custodians of the café in which she worked signed her up for a talent search one day which was being initiated by record label Bovema in order to find the best voice of the Jordaan. She finished in second place behind Johnny Jordaan. Since then she became known as the "Nightingale of Willemsstraat'.

Tante Leen frequently performed together with Johnny Jordaan and was often accompanied by famed accordion player Jan Schallig. Several of her song lyrics were written by song writer Jaap Valkhoff. Her biggest hit was the single "Oh, Johnny", directed towards Johnny Jordaan. He then replied to the recording by releasing the song "Tante Leen, Tante Leen, ik ga een liedje over je zingen" (English: Auntie Leen, Auntie Leen, I will sing a song about you) by Harry de Groot.

In 1960 Tante Leen opened a café with her second husband (her first husband died in World War II during a bombardment) at Nieuwendijk 103, where she would perform every night. In 1947 she gave birth to their son Freddie. Her song 'Ook kleine kinderen worden groot' (English: Small children do grow up) is dedicated to him. In 1968 she was selected to represent the Netherlands the annual Eurovision Song Contest but she declined the invitation. She ended her singing career in 1975 and spent the remainder of her life in a senior home.

Tante Leen was a strong supporter of association football club AFC Ajax, releasing several records dedicated to the club, such as Ajax Hup Hup Hup, Ajax and Ajax is niet dood! a duet with Johnny Jordaan.

In 1994 a statue was places at the Elandsgracht in her honour. Her image came to appear after that of Johnny Jordaan. The square is known as the Johnny Jordaanplein.

== Discography ==
=== Singles ===
Songs that reached the Flemish Ultra Top 50	Publication	Entrance	Top position	Weeks in list	Comments
Oh Johnny	1956	01-08-1956	1 (3 weeks)	32	-
Ik kan vergeven	1956	01-11-1956	7	12	-

=== DVDs ===
DVDs that reached the Dutch Music Top 30	Publication	Entrance	Top position	Weeks in list	Comments
Bij ons in de Jordaan	2005	17-09-2005	1 (3 weeks)	13	with Johnny Jordaan & Willy Alberti
