= Heerenveen IJsstadion railway station =

Railway station in Friesland, Netherlands

Heerenveen IJsstadion
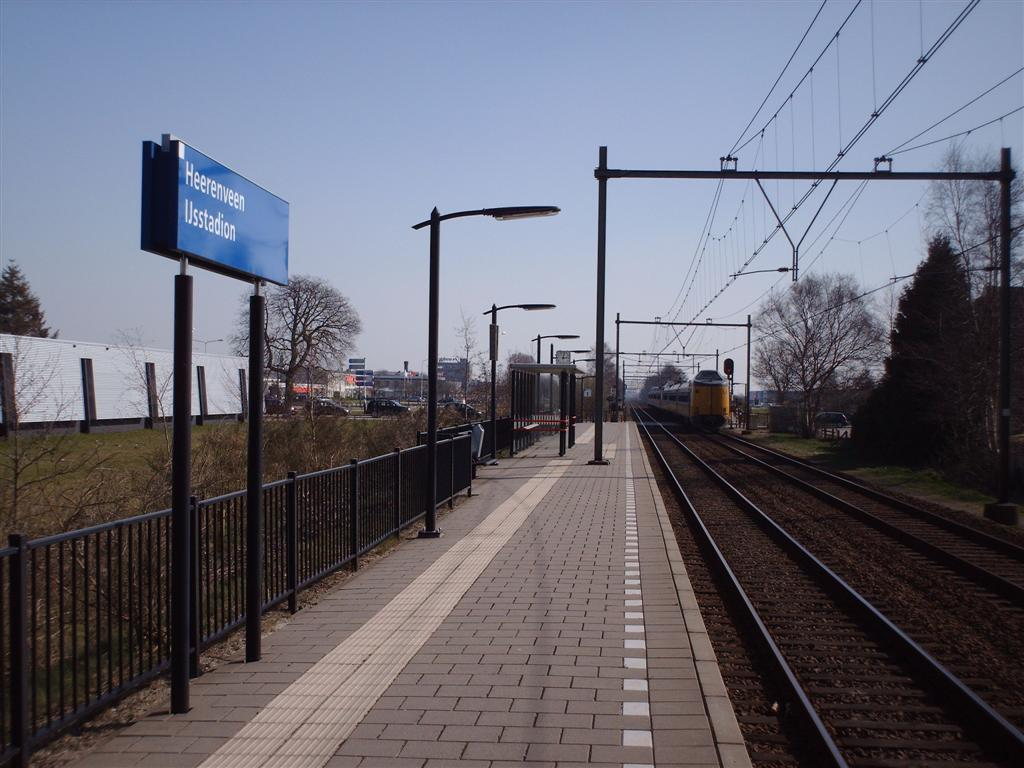

General information
- Location: Netherlands
- Coordinates: 52°56′7″N 5°56′39″E
- Line: Arnhem–Leeuwarden railway
- Platforms: 2

History
- Opened: 1 June 1975
- Closed: 22 May 1977 (regular service)
Location
- Location within Netherlands

Heerenveen IJsstadion (English: Heerenveen Ice Stadium) is a small railway station located in Heerenveen, Netherlands. The station, located about 3.5 kilometer from Heerenveen railway station, was operated by Nederlandse Spoorwegen and was only serviced in the event of sporting events at Thialf, the ice arena in Heerenveen. Services resumed on 28 February 2026 as a pilot.

The station, which has two platforms, was first opened on 1 June 1975 and provided regular service until 22 May 1977. From 2015 till 2026 there were no trains serviced to this station due to the high costs.

== See also ==
- Thialf
- List of railway stations in Friesland
