= Halte Amsterdam ArenA =

Railway station in Amsterdam, Netherlands

Amsterdam ArenA

General information
- Location: Netherlands
- Coordinates: 52°18′58″N 4°56′34″E
- Operator: Nederlandse Spoorwegen
- Platforms: 1 (train)

Other information
- Station code: Asdar

History
- Opened: 28 November 1996
Location
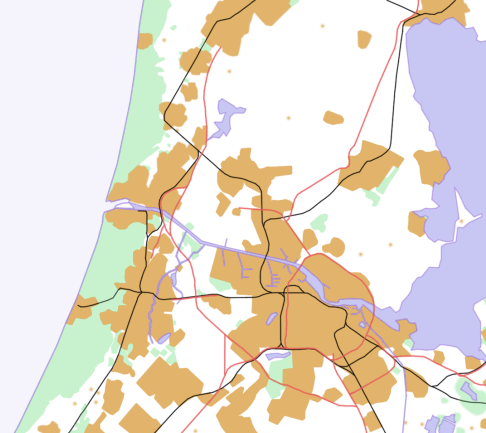
- Location within Northern Randstad Location within Netherlands

Halte Amsterdam ArenA (Asdar) is a single rail train halt in the Bijlmermeer neighbourhood of stadsdeel (borough) Amsterdam-Zuidoost in Amsterdam, Netherlands. Situated right at the Johan Cruyff Arena, a football stadium which was previously known as the Amsterdam Arena, the station is specially built for supporter trains deployed during football matches that are considered high risk to the public, such as when local football club AFC Ajax face either Feyenoord, FC Utrecht, PSV or ADO Den Haag. In away matches supporters arrive and depart via this rail station. Regular attendants of the Ajax matches usually arrive via either the Duivendrecht station or the Amsterdam Bijlmer ArenA station. Many away supporters also commonly arrive at the stadium by bus as well.

== History ==
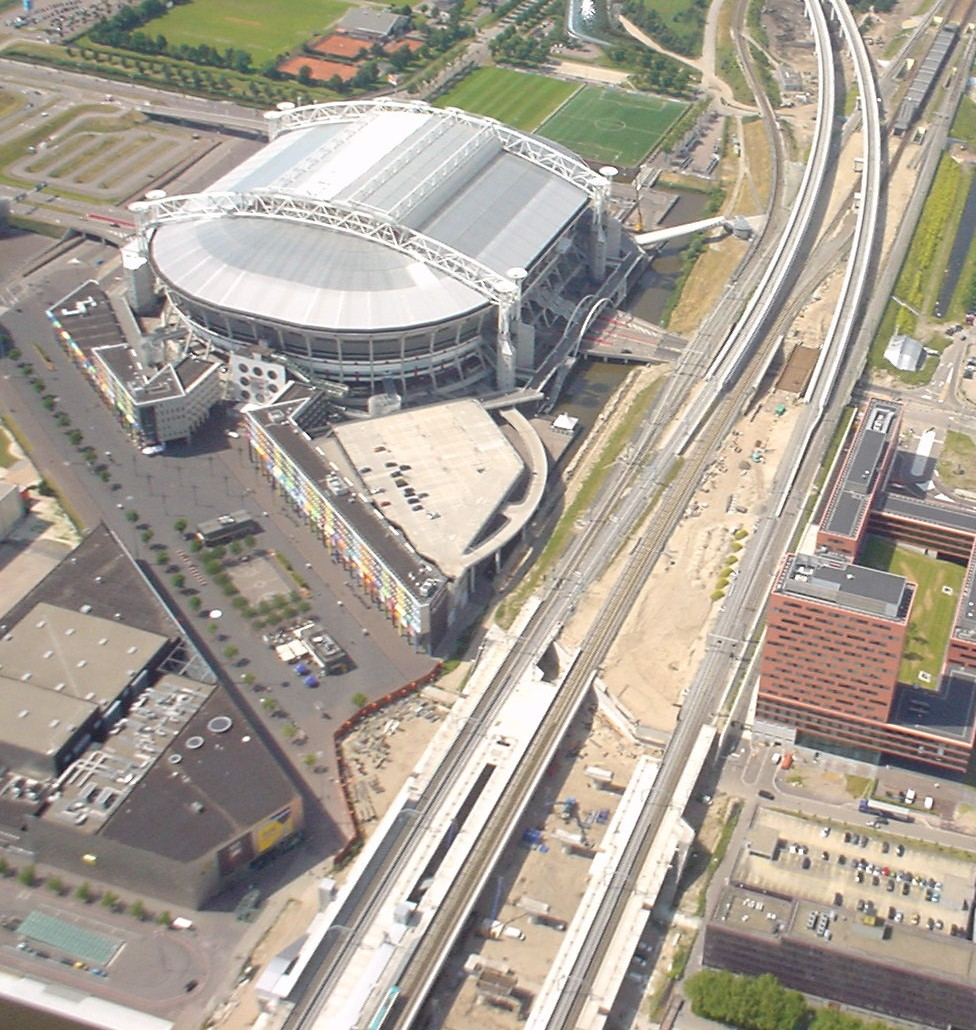
Aerial view, June 2005

Completed in 1996 along with the then newly constructed stadium, the station has one platform and one track and its train services are operated by the Nederlandse Spoorwegen. The station is specifically designed for supporter trains of away supporters of clubs for matches which are considered a high risk factor such as when Ajax play their arch-rivals Feyenoord, or against teams like FC Groningen for example. It is also sometimes used as a pickup point for Ajax fans for risk-games, or the Dutch cup final.

The stop is situated at the connector of Diemen Zuid station and Amsterdam Bijlmer Arena railway station (see diagram in article Amsterdam–Arnhem railway) and consists of a single platform which is connected to the Johan Cruyff Arena via a steel bridge. The steel bridge of the station won an architecture prize in the city. The location is just as the Stadium, in between the Amsterdam Bijlmer ArenA railway station and the Strandvliet metro station.

The stop is only accessible from the direction of Diemen Zuid. Trains arriving from the direction of Woerden, Utrecht and Breukelen have to first reach the Diemen Zuid station before heading back towards the ArenA.
