= Eindhoven Stadion railway station =

Railway station in the Netherlands

Eindhoven Stadion
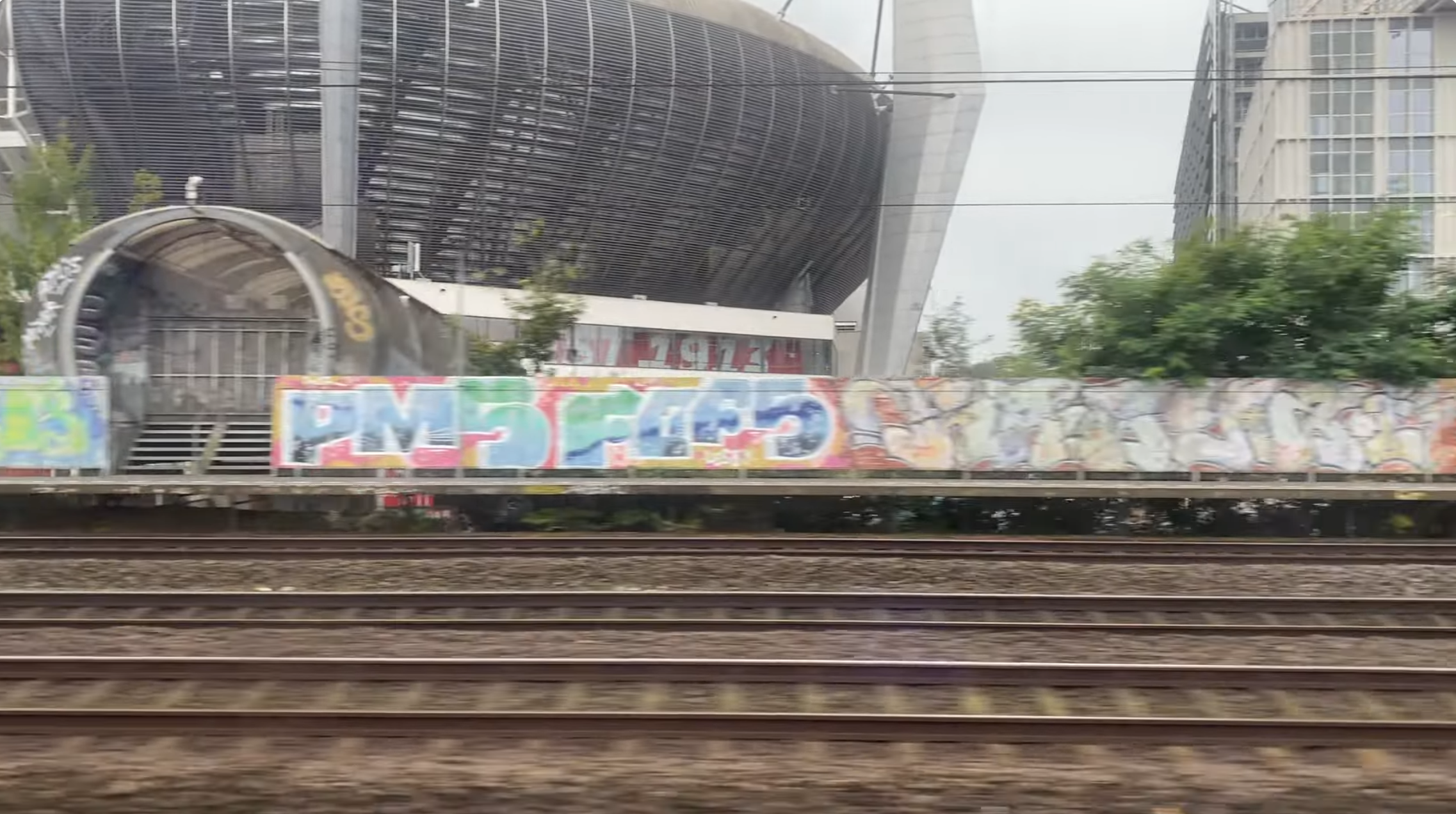
- Eindhoven Stadion as seen from inside of a passing train.

General information
- Location: Netherlands
- Coordinates: 51°26′34.67″N 5°28′2.30″E
- Line: Breda–Eindhoven railway

History
- Opened: 1990
Location
- Location within Netherlands

Eindhoven Stadion (English: Eindhoven Stadium) is a small railway station located in Eindhoven, Netherlands and is opened in 1990. The station, located about 900 meter from Eindhoven Centraal railway station, is operated by Nederlandse Spoorwegen but is only serviced in the event of football matches or other special events at Philips Stadion, the stadium of football club PSV Eindhoven.

The station has only one simple platform which has a length of approximately 250 to 275 meters. In the event of football matches or other major events at the stadium, trains traveling between Eindhoven Strijp-S and Eindhoven Centraal will stop at the station. When leaving the stadium it is only possible to travel in the direction of Eindhoven Central, where many Intercity services go from.

There are no facilities at the station, although it is equipped with fences and cameras to prevent violence. The station is completely closed as it is only possible to access and exit the station through a pedestrian bridge which connects directly to Philips Stadion. However, stairs alongside the station can be used in the event of an emergency.

== See also ==
- Philips Stadion
