= Rotterdam Stadion railway station =

Railway station in Rotterdam, Netherlands

Rotterdam Stadion
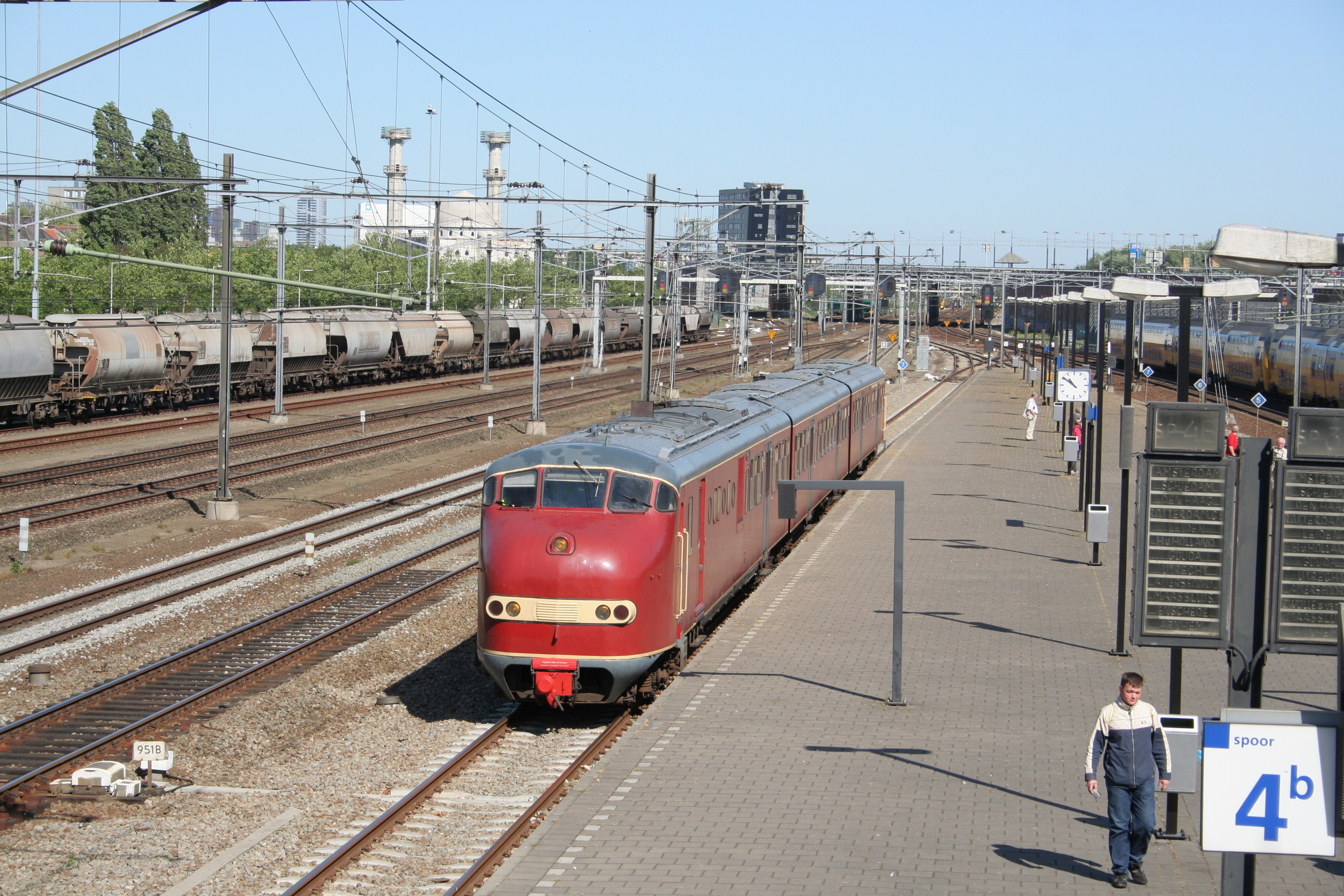
- Rotterdam Stadion

General information
- Location: Netherlands
- Coordinates: 51°53′38″N 4°31′12″E
- Platforms: 2

Other information
- Station code: Rtst

History
- Opened: 1937
Location
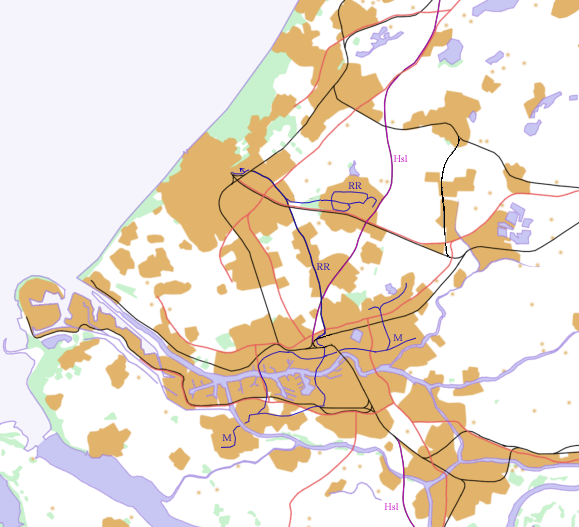
- Location within Southwest Randstad Location within Netherlands

Rotterdam Stadion is a railway station in the city of Rotterdam in the Netherlands, located on the railway line between Rotterdam and Dordrecht. The station is located in front of De Kuip, venue of the football club Feyenoord The station is only in service during football matches or other events at the stadium.

== History ==
The railway station Rotterdam Stadion was built in 1937, as a station on the Breda–Rotterdam railway. It was specially built for Stadion Feijenoord which opened earlier that year. It is not really much of a station, in fact it is a platform, between two pieces of railway track, giving it two platform tracks. A traverse makes it possible to go to the stadium. Due to hooliganism a special tube was built around the traverse to separate home and away supporters.

== The future ==
Plans are being made for a new Feyenoord stadium, at the border of the Meuse. With the new stadium, comes a make-over of the whole area. In this plan, there will be a new, big Intercity station making it a public-transportation hub. In November 2022 the Dutch government announced a big investment in infrastructure throughout the entire country. A part of this investment is upgrading Rotterdam Stadion to a full service railway station with the new name Rotterdam Stadionpark.

== Train services ==
Shuttle train services from Rotterdam Centraal and Dordrecht operate when football matches or concerts take place in the stadium.
