= Philips Stadion =

Football stadium in Eindhoven, Netherlands

- PSV Stadion (UEFA name)
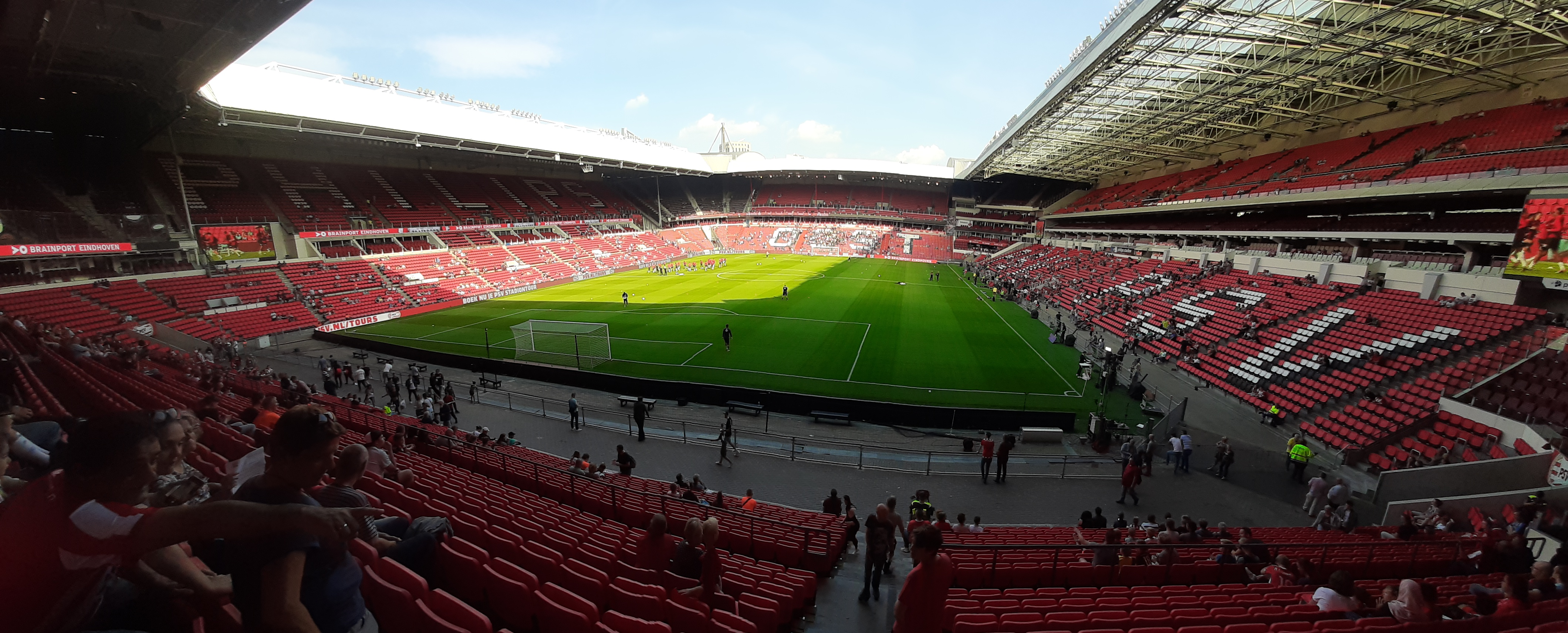
- UEFA
- Interactive map of Philips Stadion
- Former names: Philips Sportpark
- Location: Frederiklaan 10A; Eindhoven, Netherlands
- Coordinates: 51°26′30″N 5°28′3″E
- Owner: PSV Eindhoven, Eindhoven municipality (ground under stadium)
- Operator: PSV Eindhoven
- Capacity: 35,119
- Surface: Grass
- Record attendance: 35,292; PSV vs Manchester United, 15 September 2015
- Field size: 105 by 68 metres (114.8 yd × 74.4 yd)

Construction
- Opened: 12 December 1910

Tenants
- PSV Eindhoven (1916–present); Netherlands national football team (selected matches)

The Philips Stadion (Dutch pronunciation: [ˈfilɪpˌstaːdijɔn]) is a football stadium in Eindhoven, Netherlands. As the home of PSV Eindhoven (Philips Sport Vereniging), it is also known as PSV Stadion. With a capacity of 35,119, it is the third-largest football stadium in the country. Established as the Philips Sportpark, it was constructed as a sports field for Philips employees in 1910. The Philips Elftal played football matches from 1911 until 1913, when the team was succeeded by PSV. Since 1913, PSV has used the original ground as its home stadium.

The stadium has gone through several extensions in its history: After a wooden stand in 1916, seating and standing places slowly enclosed the field throughout the first decades. Two extensive renovations in the 1970s and 1990s first created a covered stadium, and then a two-tiered ground with extensive commercial spaces. The completion of the four corners in 2002 eventually led to its current capacity.

The Philips Stadion currently holds a four-star rating by UEFA. It has hosted a range of Netherlands national team fixtures since 1971. In 2013, PSV's reserve team, Jong PSV, also played their league matches at the stadium. They now play their games at the training complex De Herdgang. Furthermore, the Philips Stadion was the location for three UEFA Euro 2000 group stage matches, as well as the 2006 UEFA Cup Final. Aside from football-related purposes, the ground is occasionally used for music concerts.

== History ==
=== First decades ===
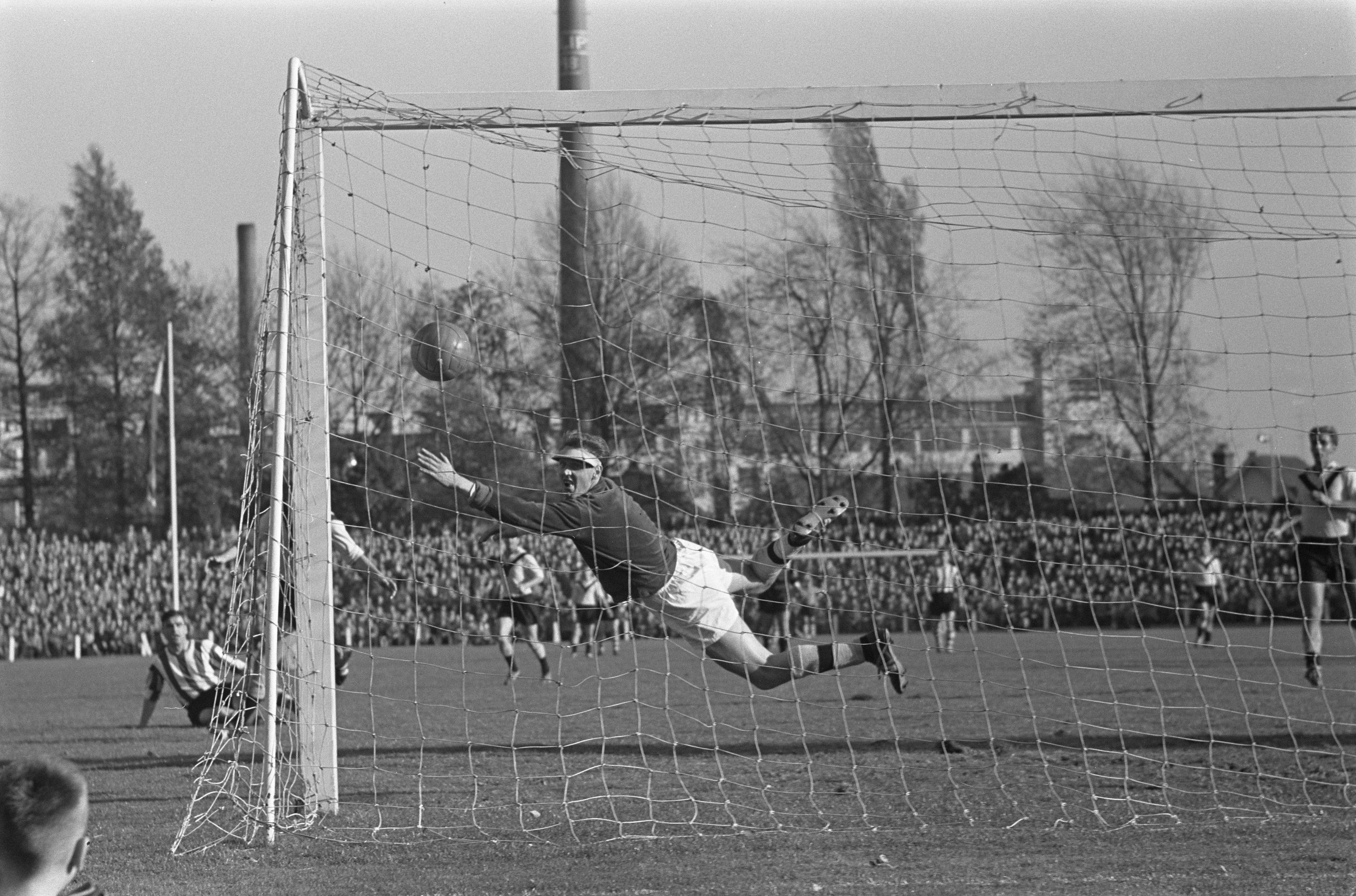
Coen Dillen (1926–1990) scores for PSV. In the background, the situation of the stands in 1959 can be seen.

In 1910, the Philips company erected new houses to serve the growing need for employee housing. The area, fittingly named Philipsdorp ("Philips Village"), was built on walking distance from the Philips factories and located (at that point) in the outskirts of Eindhoven. Urban planner Gerrit Jan de Jongh envisaged a village green in the center, creating a space for leisure and sports. In this green, a football field, a korfball field and a bandstand were planned. The area was named the Philips Sportpark. Meanwhile, Philips founded a football team for its young employees, named Philips Elftal. Their first match marks the first recorded use of the Philips Sportpark: on 15 January 1911, the Philips Elftal won their debut match against Hollandia from Woensel. The Philips Elftal continued to play at the field for two seasons; in 1913 the team was succeeded by PSV, who also took the Philips Sportpark as their home ground. PSV's first official home game was the Eindhoven derby against EVV on 10 October 1915.

In its first years, the field did not include any seating space for spectators. This changed in 1916, when the first wooden stand was built, providing room for 550 viewers. The stand was funded by Philips, which was celebrating its 25th anniversary that year. Later, the stand was replaced by a new main stand in 1933, providing seating space for 900 spectators. Five years later, during PSV's twenty-fifth anniversary, a scoreboard was installed in the stadium. The board was a gift by the official PSV fan union. In 1941, PSV decided to build stands across the entire ground. The decision was made to create an oval shape with a running track between field and stands, enabling the possibility for athletic, cycling and ice skating matches. After completion, the capacity rose to 18,000. During World War II, the ground was claimed by German occupants and used for military purposes. The final days of World War II witnessed great destruction in the city of Eindhoven and also to the stadium itself. Repairs were duly made.

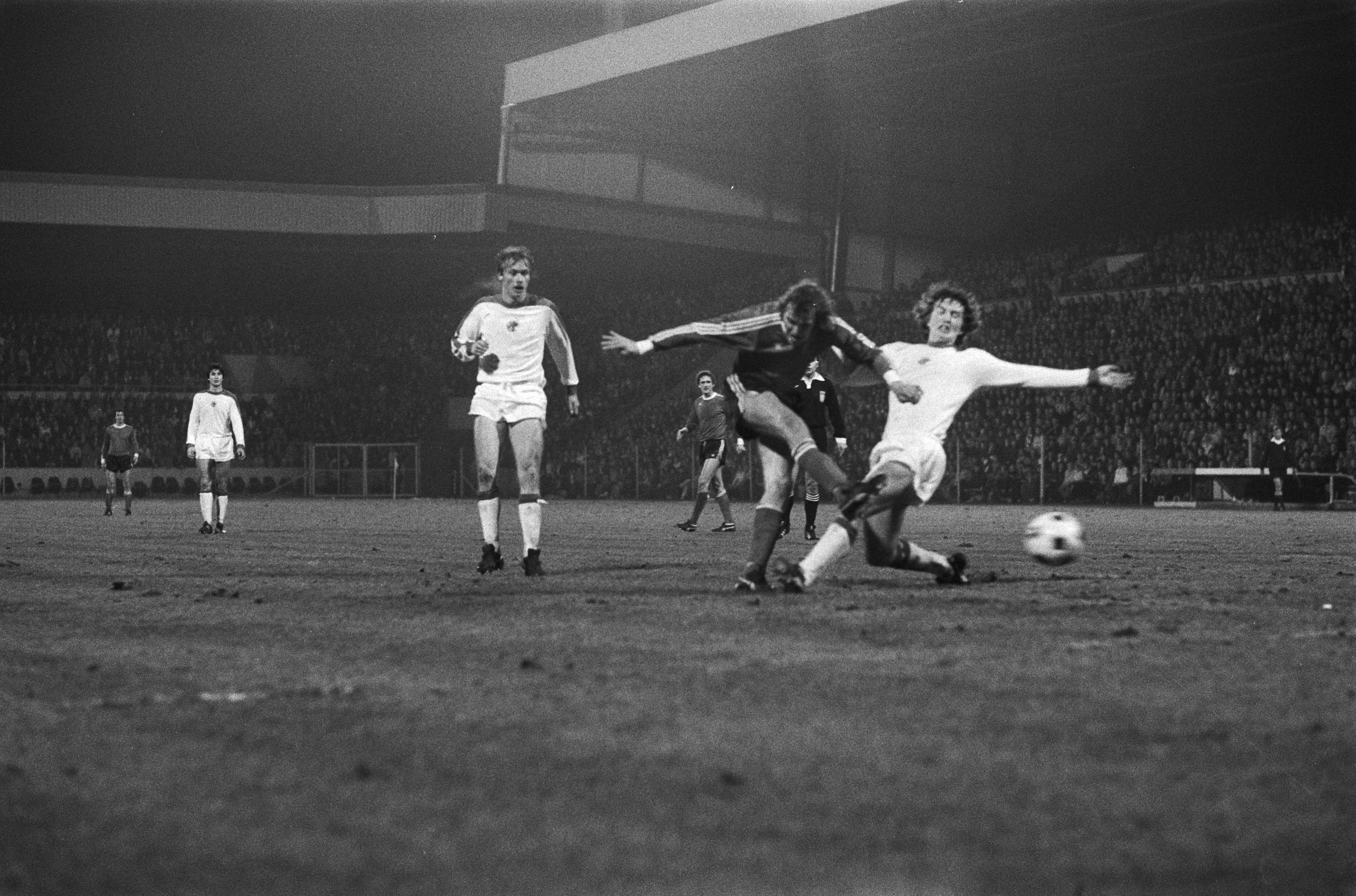
René van de Kerkhof scores for PSV in 1979. The height difference between the main stand and the remaining stands is clearly visible.

In 1953, the main stand was refurbished and extended, creating space for a press room and meeting spaces. Also, a memorial was revealed, commemorating the war victims. In 1958, the running track was removed, making space for a bigger field. New stands are built as well, increasing the capacity to 22,000. Four 40-meter high floodlights were installed by Philips in the stadium in the same year, making evening matches possible. The lights were inaugurated on April 9 with an exhibition match against RSC Anderlecht. A complete renovation of the stadium started in 1969. After its completion in 1977, the stadium was completely enclosed and every seat was covered. The main (south) stand peaked above the other stands. The capacity rose to 26,500, of which 12,000 were for standing spectators. The renovated ground was celebrated with a match against Leeds United. Earlier, the ground was used by the Netherlands national football team for the first time. On November 17, 1971, the Netherlands played a qualifying match for the 1972 UEFA European Championship against Luxembourg (8–0).

=== Upgrade to two-tiered stadium ===
In April 1987, cracks in the south stand were discovered. The damage was caused by an alkali–silica reaction. PSV chairman Jacques Ruts decided to rebuild the stand, and simultaneously provide more space for business relations and sponsors. Up until then, the stadium only offered regular spectator seats. Ruts got inspired by the way American stadiums had built luxury boxes and used them for business opportunities. After the renovation (which costed 40 million guilders), the new south stand was two-tiered, with 830 VIP-seats behind glass in the middle. Also, new offices, a press room, a youth hall and a restaurant were created. The opening of the stand was celebrated with an exhibition match against Milan on 17 August 1988. Two years later, the ground changed its name from Philips Sportpark to Philips Stadion.

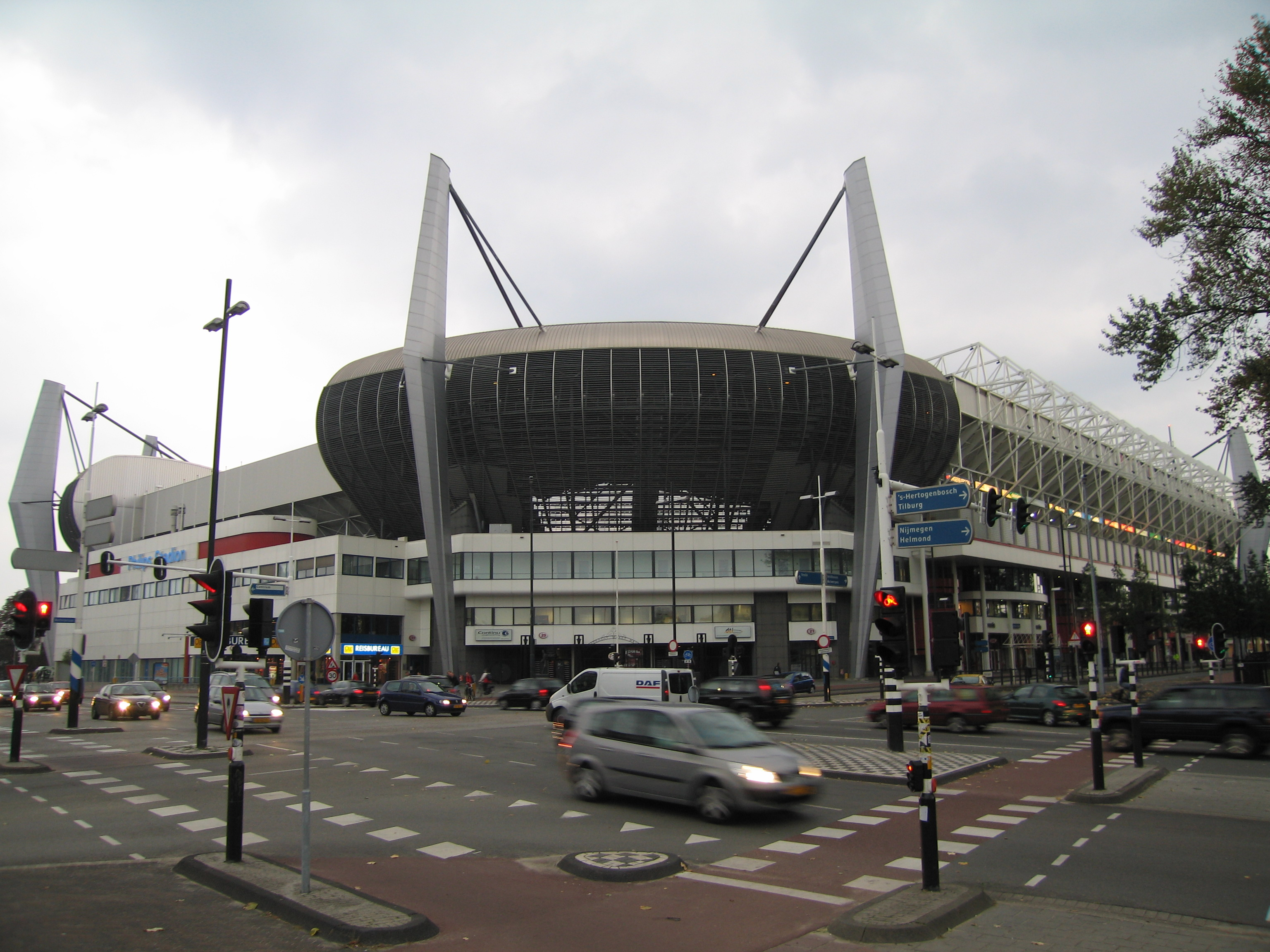
The north-east corner of the stadium, which was completed in 2000.

In the nineties, the other stands were also raised to the level of the south stand. The west and east stand were expanded in 1993, and the north stand in 1996. After completion, the seating capacity reached 30,000. Until then, the fanatic part of the PSV support would be located on the so-called L-side on standing terraces. After the renovations in the nineties, the standing terraces disappeared and the fanatic fans moved to the east stand. The renovations in the 1990s were in time for UEFA Euro 2000, held in the Netherlands and Belgium. The Philips Stadion hosted three group matches: Portugal beat England, 3–2; Sweden and Turkey ended in a goalless draw; and Italy beat Sweden, 2–1. The last major renovation was the closing of the four open corners of the stadium. The two corners on the north side were built in 2000; the corners on the south side were finalized in 2001. Along with creating more seats, the new corners had window blind-type constructions, which allowed air to flow through in order to let the grass breath. These frames can be closed during events, to protect spectators from weather conditions. The four corners were designed by Toon van Aken.

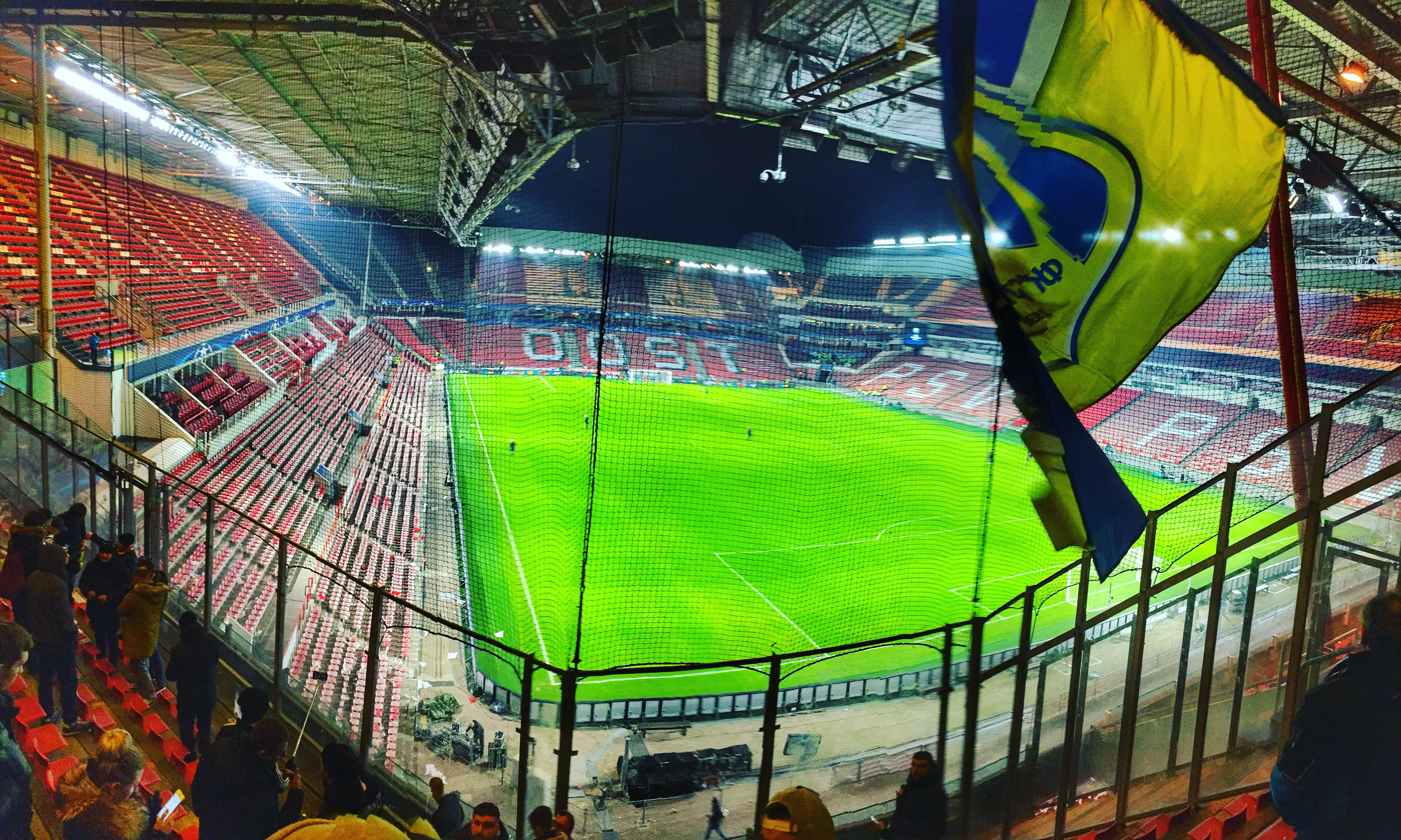
PSV versus FC Rostov.

In March 2001, PSV faced 1. FC Kaiserslautern in an UEFA Cup fixture. During the match, fans were provoked by Kaiserslautern players, resulting in spectators attempting to break through a fence separating the stands and the field. After the gate was cracked, PSV coach Eric Gerets and several players had to personally stop the fans from entering the field. After this incident, problems with fan violence faded and in the summer of 2005, the PSV board decided to remove the tall fences around the pitch. They were replaced with 35 inches (90 cm) high railings keeping the spectators off the grass. Unauthorized persons who do invade the pitch will receive a €15,000 penalty and a ten-year ban from visiting the Philips Stadion. The 2006 UEFA Cup Final was held in the Philips Stadion; Sevilla defeated Middlesbrough 4–0. For the final, the stadium was temporarily named ‘PSV Stadion’, because UEFA did not allow the Philips name to be used.

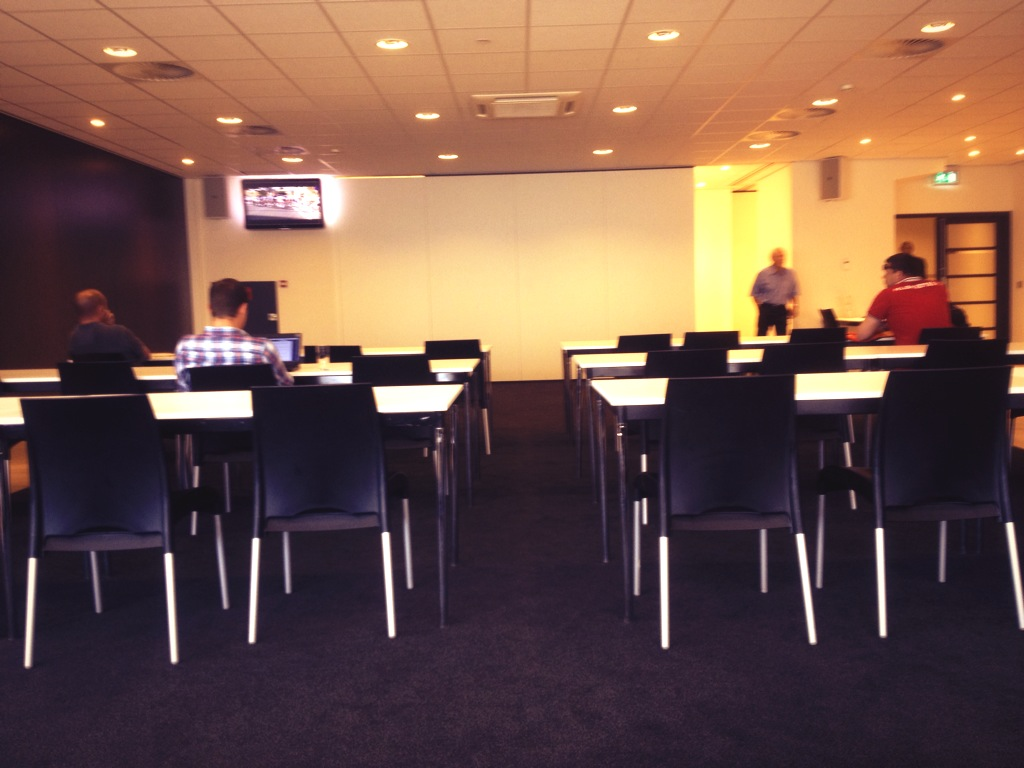
Press room at the Philips Stadion prior to a press conference.

Plans to further expand the ground to 45,000 seats have been examined, but turned down after the Netherlands lost the 2018 FIFA World Cup bid. In 2011, the ground under the stadium (and the training facilities) were sold for €48.4 million to the Eindhoven municipality in a leasehold estate construction. In recent years, the stadium has gone through several minor modernization programs: the fourth floor was renovated in 2008, LED-powered advertisement boarding was installed by Philips in 2009. In 2012, a modernization plan for the ground was presented. The plan included new entrances, sponsor lodges and parts of the stands. The second floor of the stadium was renovated in 2013. After PSV's reserve team Jong PSV was admitted to the Eerste Divisie, they relocated their home matches to the Philips Stadion.

== Other uses ==
The Philips Stadion is incidentally used for music concerts. During these events, the stadium offers space for around 30,000 visitors. In 1992, a version of Carl Orff's Carmina Burana was played at the stadium. Two years later, Eros Ramazzotti gave a concert at the Philips Stadion. In the aftermath, the grass suffered heavily after being trampled by concert goers. It prompted the PSV board's reluctance to hold more events at the ground. It was not until 2006 that the stadium would host a concert: Dutch artist Guus Meeuwis played three concerts in front of a sold-out crowd. Since 2006, Meeuwis has played at the stadium every year. His shows were sometimes combined with live coverage of a Netherlands football team match in case of a planned fixture. In 2007, Dutch band BLØF also played at the ground.

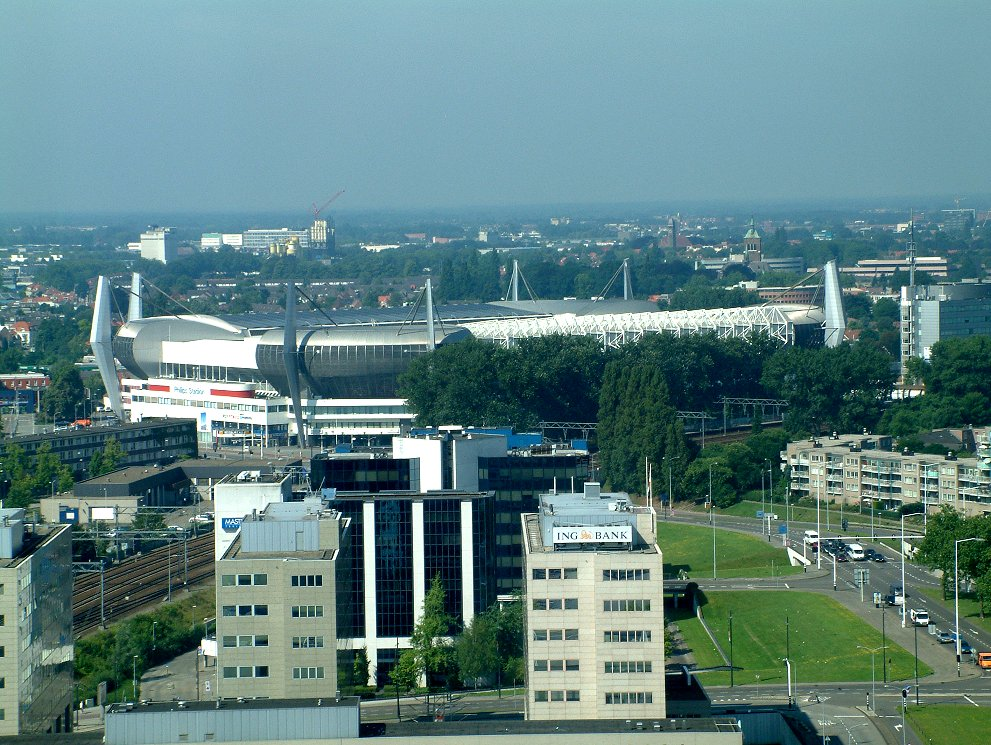
An aerial view of the Philips Stadion

== Transport ==
The stadium can be reached by a 10-minute walk from the Eindhoven main railway station, and a 15-minute walk from the Eindhoven Strijp-S railway station. Bus lines 401, 402 and 403 call at the 'Philips-stadion' bus stop, just outside the stadium. Bus 401 is a service between the railway station and Eindhoven Airport, making the Philips Stadion directly connected with the airport. In the event of major football matches or other events, the stadium has its own railway platform, the Eindhoven Stadion railway station. The platform is only reachable through a pedestrian bridge that connects directly to the stadium. The station is mainly meant for travelling away fans: the bridge leads to the away-section in the stands. The station is only serviceable by trains travelling from the direction of the Eindhoven Strijp-S railway station to the Eindhoven railway station.

== Euro 2000 matches ==
Date		Result		Round
12 June 2000	Portugal	3–2	England	Group A
15 June 2000	Sweden	0–0	Turkey	Group B
19 June 2000	Italy	2–1	Sweden	Group B

== Average attendances ==
Tenants	League season	Home games	Average attendance
PSV	2023-24	17	34,217
PSV	2022-23	17	31,923
PSV	2018-19	17	34,071
PSV	2017-18	17	33,344
PSV	2016-17	17	33,724
PSV	2015-16	17	33,594
PSV	2014-15	17	32,465
PSV	2013-14	17	33,553
PSV	2012-13	17	33,082
PSV	2011-12	17	33,353
PSV	2010-11	17	33,612

== See also ==
- Lists of stadiums

Preceded by Estádio José Alvalade; Lisbon	UEFA Cup; Final venue 2006	Succeeded by Hampden Park; Glasgow
Preceded by San Mamés; Bilbao	UEFA Women's Champions League; Final venue 2025	Succeeded by TBA
