= André Hazes =

Dutch singer and actor (1951–2004)

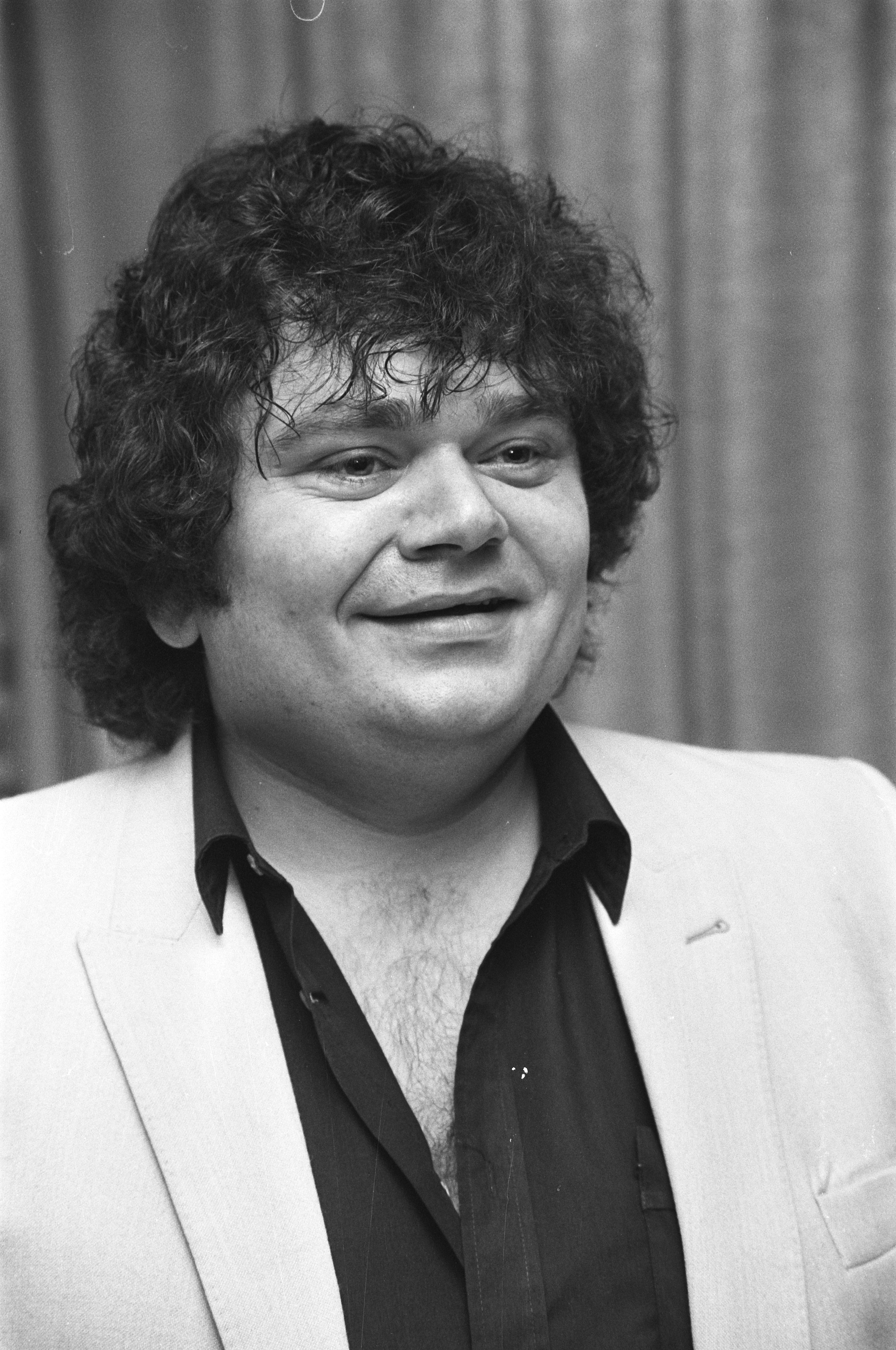
- André Hazes in 1982

Background information
- Also known as: André Hazes Sr.; Dré Hazes
- Born: André Gerardus Hazes; 30 June 1951; Amsterdam, Netherlands
- Died: 23 September 2004 (aged 53) Woerden, Netherlands
- Genres: Levenslied; Nederpop; Pop; Blues
- Occupation: Singer
- Years active: 1959; 1976–1977; 1980–2004
- Labels: EMI; Phillips
- Spouses: Annie Dijkstra (m. 1974; div. 1979); Ellen Wolf (m. 1981; div. 1990); Rachel van Galen (m. 1991)
- Children: 4
- Website: andrehazes.nl

André Gerardus Hazes (30 June 1951 – 23 September 2004) was a Dutch singer. As an accomplished levenslied singer, Hazes recorded 36 studio and live albums, and 55 singles prior to his death in 2004. His music is well-known in the Netherlands and Flanders, known for sentimental and simple lyrics.

His biggest hits include "Eenzame Kerst" (1976), "Een Beetje Verliefd" (1981), "Ik Meen 't" (1985), "Wij Houden van Oranje" (1988), "Bloed, Zweet en Tranen" (2002), "Zij Gelooft in Mij" (Originally from 1981, re-recorded and released in 1999, re-released after his death in 2004) and "Blijf Bij Mij" (a virtual duet with Gerard Joling, 2007).

== Biography ==
=== Early years ===
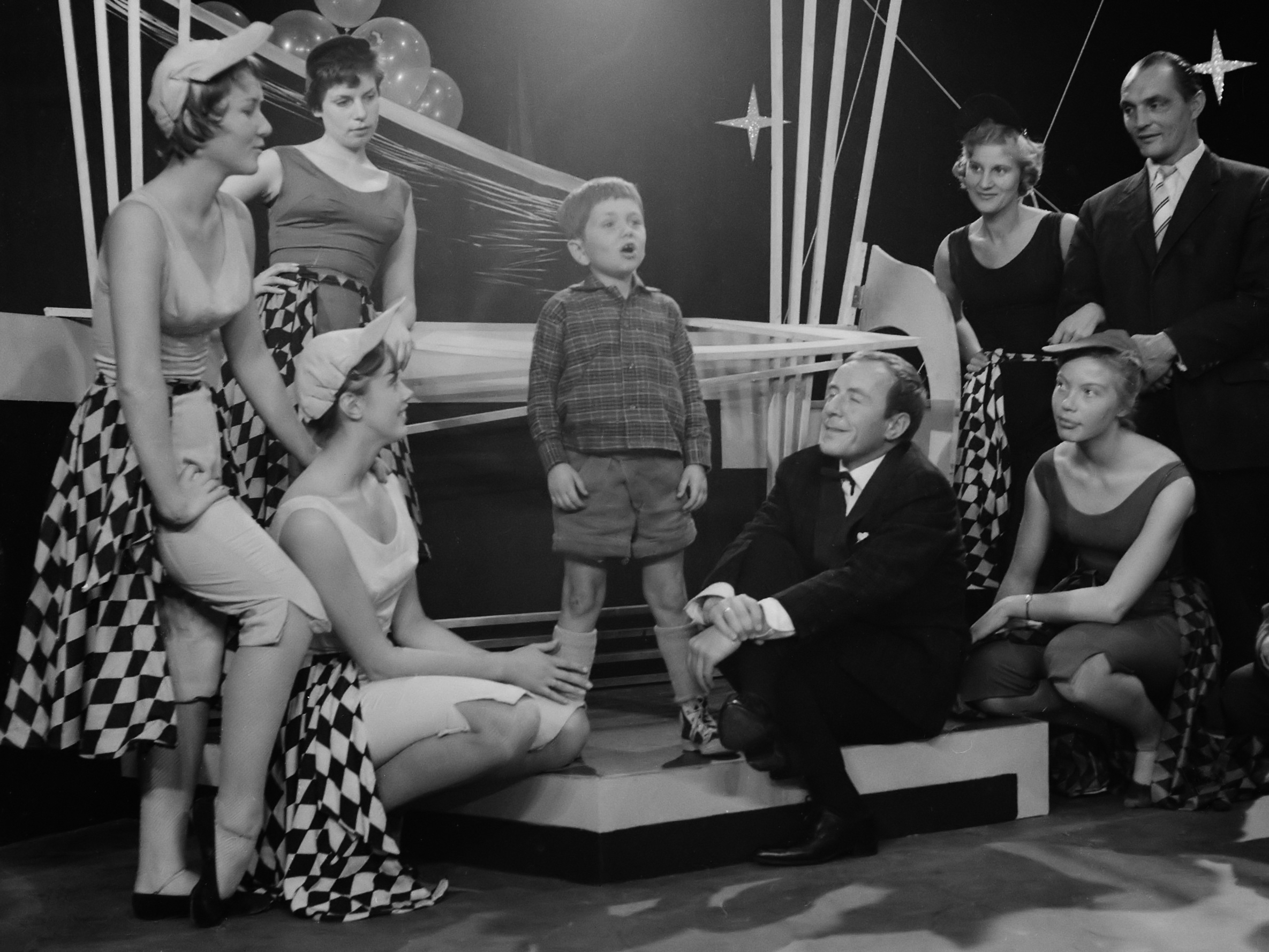
Hazes in 1959, age 8

Hazes was born in 1951 in Amsterdam's De Pijp area as the son of Joop Hazes and Miep Hazes (né Botschuiver). Hazes had four brothers and a sister. At the age of eight, he was discovered at the Albert Cuyp Market by comedian Johnny Kraaykamp and made his television debut on Weekendshow in 1959, where he sang a song in fake Italian, "Piove". Two singles, "Droomschip" and "Juanita", were released but did not lead to a career in music. Several requests for performances were received, but these were rejected by Kraaijkamp so that Hazes could focus on school. Hazes' father had received a fine for his son's three absences from school for the television program. Because of his performance, Hazes received a visit from the famous singer Caterina Valente at home in November.

=== 1970s ===
Hazes pursued several odd jobs (ordinary seaman, flower delivery boy, chimney sweep, butcher's apprentice, bicycle repairman, trench digger, construction worker, demolition man, market salesman, and disc jockey) before building up a reputation as a singing barman in his hometown, in café De Krommert on the Witte de Withstraat. In 1976 he wrote and demoed "Eenzame Kerst", a song about a prisoner's lonely Christmas, for singer Willy Alberti hoping that he would record it; Alberti suggested that Hazes record it himself. The single sold 70,000 copies in three weeks and made him an instant star.

An album, Zo is het leven ("Such is life") was released in 1977 and reached the Dutch top 20; extracted singles "Mama" and "De Vlieger" didn't chart although the latter became a Dutch standard (and a top 40 hit second time round) in years to come. Still, he returned to bartending.

=== 1980s ===
In 1980 he signed a contract with EMI, and soon after that his career started to take off. "Een Vriend" ("A Friend") and "Een Beetje Verliefd" ("A Little in Love)" were both top ten hits in 1981, produced by his best friend Tim Griek.

In 1981 Hazes was awarded the Zilveren Harp (Silver Harp) for his album Gewoon André (Just André) which sold 500,000 copies and was certified five times platinum in its first year of release and two more times two years later. Three of the album's songs, including "Een Beetje Verliefd", were written for Hazes by Aart Mol and his colleagues from the 1970s band Catapult, who had formed the production company Cat Music, which would write a total of 39 songs for Hazes. 1982 was the year of his great concert in the Concertgebouw in Amsterdam.

During his heyday Hazes also had a sideline as an actor; in 1982 he played a restaurant owner in the Inspector General-inspired movie De Boezemvriend (starring his comedian namesake Andre van Duin), in 1983 he appeared in the comedy series Zoals U Wenst Mevrouw (As you wish Madam) as a down-and-out taking a gardening job under false pretenses and singing new lyrics to recent hits. He also appeared in commercials for toasts (as an Italian singer) and custard (as a football-playing son of singer/actress Joke Bruijs). Meanwhile Hazes' backing musicians at the time recorded a parody medley for their notorious comedy music project Rubberen Robbie.

In 1986 Hazes released two albums; the first featured Italian covers (including "Volare", "Buona Sera" and a new version of "Piove" which he first sang in his childhood days) and was dedicated to the memory of Willy Alberti. The second featured translated versions of Peter Maffay's "Du" and Gloria Gaynor's "I Will Survive".

In February 1988 record producer and best friend, Tim Griek, died in a car accident. Hazes dedicated the album Liefde, leven, geven to Griek's memory.

In 1988 he sang the song "Wij houden van Oranje" ("We love Orange"—Orange being the national colour of the Netherlands and also a nickname for the Netherlands national football team and in general all sports teams) for the football championships. The song became very popular as the Netherlands won the European Championships in the same year.

In 1989 his career was stalled after several years without record releases and to revive it record company EMI approached Hazes for a new album, asking him what he wanted to do next. EMI offered him a free hand and full control if he decided to revitalize his career. He responded by recording the bilingual album Dit is wat ik wil ("This is what I want"), a blues and rock 'n roll album featuring many contemporary rock artists like Herman Brood and Jan Akkerman. Extracted singles are "De Gokker" ("The Gambler") and "Jammer" ("Crying Time", converted into an earth pollution-song); the latter was backed by "Working in a Coal Mine".

Joe Bourne, an American singer living in the Netherlands at the time, released an English-language version of "Een Beetje Verliefd" for his tribute album Bourne in Holland.

=== 1990s ===
1999 saw the release of a hit documentary on Hazes, named Zij Gelooft in Mij ("She Has Faith in Me") after his translation of the Kenny Rogers song "She Believes in Me". The film portrayed the singer as a tragic man of simple ways, a well-meaning but clueless father and lousy husband tormented by stage fright and a propensity towards drinking. Hazes had mixed feelings about the film, but most viewers saw a man who had remained true to his humble background and whose raw emotional songs were genuinely felt. It earned him something of a cult status outside of his loyal fan base, with the cultural establishment taking him in a somewhat uncomfortable embrace.

Hazes was known to live unhealthily, beer being his main vice. He himself once said: "If it wasn't for the fame, I'd be a full-blown alcoholic." In fact, he already was; he just managed to integrate this well into his life.

=== 2000s ===
In May 2002 Hazes briefly entered local politics by getting elected to the municipal council of De Ronde Venen for the local political party Ronde Venen Belang. He quickly became the focus of criticism because after a month he hadn't shown up yet for any meetings. After being criticized and ridiculed in national newspapers, Hazes did show for a council meeting in June 2002, but shortly before it started Hazes suffered a mental breakdown and was unable to attend. Four days later he announced his resignation and offered his seat to the party.

On 23 September 2004 Hazes died of cardiac arrest.

In an interview with de Volkskrant, he made the remark that he knew as a child that when he died, he would make the television news. Not only did that happen, four days after he died, a startling crowd of about 48,000 attended a memorial ceremony in his honour at the Amsterdam Arena stadium. Over 8 million viewers followed the event which was broadcast live on Dutch and Belgian television. Hazes was cremated the day after.

On 29 September 2004 the single "Zij Gelooft in Mij" was re-released and was his first No. 1 hit in the Dutch Top 40. In 2007, one of his songs, the hit "Blijf Bij Mij" ("Stay With Me"), reached the number one position in the Dutch Top 40 again. This song was sung with Gerard Joling. "Blijf Bij Mij" is a cover from the song "Forse" by the Italian singer Pupo.

Exactly one year after his death, in accordance with his wishes, Hazes' remaining ashes were distributed over a couple of skyrockets, which were then launched into the sky by his surviving relatives. On the same day, his statue was unveiled in De Pijp, Amsterdam, near the singer's birthplace.

== Personal life ==
Hazes married Annie Dijkstra in 1974. She had given birth to a daughter, Nathalie, in 1973. The couple divorced in 1979. After their divorce, Dijkstra and Hazes had a legal battle involving the rights to sell a biography of Hazes; Dijkstra lost the case. After the divorce from André, Dijkstra married his older brother Joop, who went viral in 2023 with the song "Mijn broertje".

In 1981, Hazes married Ellen Wolf. She gave birth to a son, Melvin, in 1982. The couple divorced in 1990; Wolf later died of breast cancer in 2005, at age 47.

In 1991, Hazes married his third wife, longtime girlfriend Rachel van Galen. Hazes was Van Galen's senior by nineteen years; she gave birth to his third and fourth child, daughter Roxeanne (1993) and son André Jr. (1994). Hazes remained married to his third wife until his death in 2004.

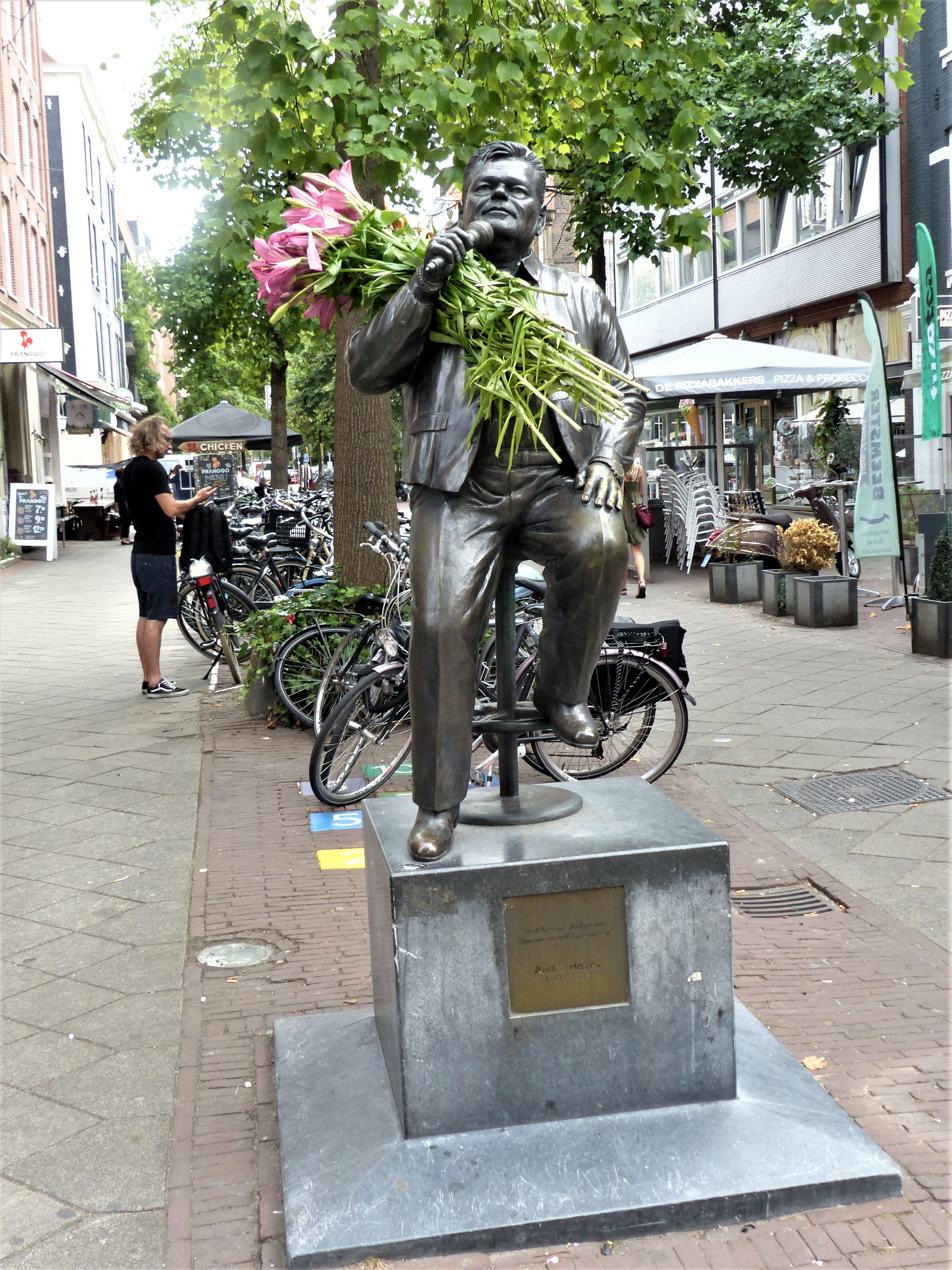
André Hazes

After his death, a conflict arose between Hazes' first two children. They accused his third wife Rachel of commercially exploiting Hazes' death for her personal gain. Hazes' youngest two children, Roxeanne and André Jr., released a cover album ("Voor Jou, Van Jou" [For You, From You]) in 2010, containing the most famous of Hazes' songs. They have gone on to become successful artists in their own right.

In 2016, Hazes' first grandson was born. He is the son of Nathalie. In 2016, Hazes' second grandson André III was born. He is the son of André Jr.

== Discography ==
=== Studio albums ===
- Zo Is Het Leven (1977)
- Eenzame Kerst (1977)
- 'N Vriend (1980)
- Gewoon André (1981)
- Met Liefde (1982)
- Voor Jou (1983)
- Zoals U Wenst Mevrouw (1984)
- Jij en Ik (1984)
- Alleen Met Jou (1985)
- Innamorato (1986)
- Jij Bent Alles (1987)
- Liefde, Leven, Geven (1988)
- Dit Is Wat Ik Wil (1989)
- Kleine Jongen (1990)
- Samen (1991)
- Kerstfeest Voor Ons (1992)
- Met Heel Mijn Hart (1993)
- Onder de Mensen (1995)
- Zonder Zorgen (1996)
- Mijn Gevoel (1997)
- Want Ik Hou Van Jou (2000)
- Nu (2001)
- Strijdlustig (2003)
- Samen met Dré (2007)

== Movie ==
Lemming Film released the movie Bloed, zweet & tranen, named after a song of Hazes, in 2015. The film describes the life of Hazes in his childhood, in his heyday and during the last weeks of his life.
