= Johan Cruyff Arena =

Sports venue in Amsterdam, Netherlands

- "De Arena" (The Arena)

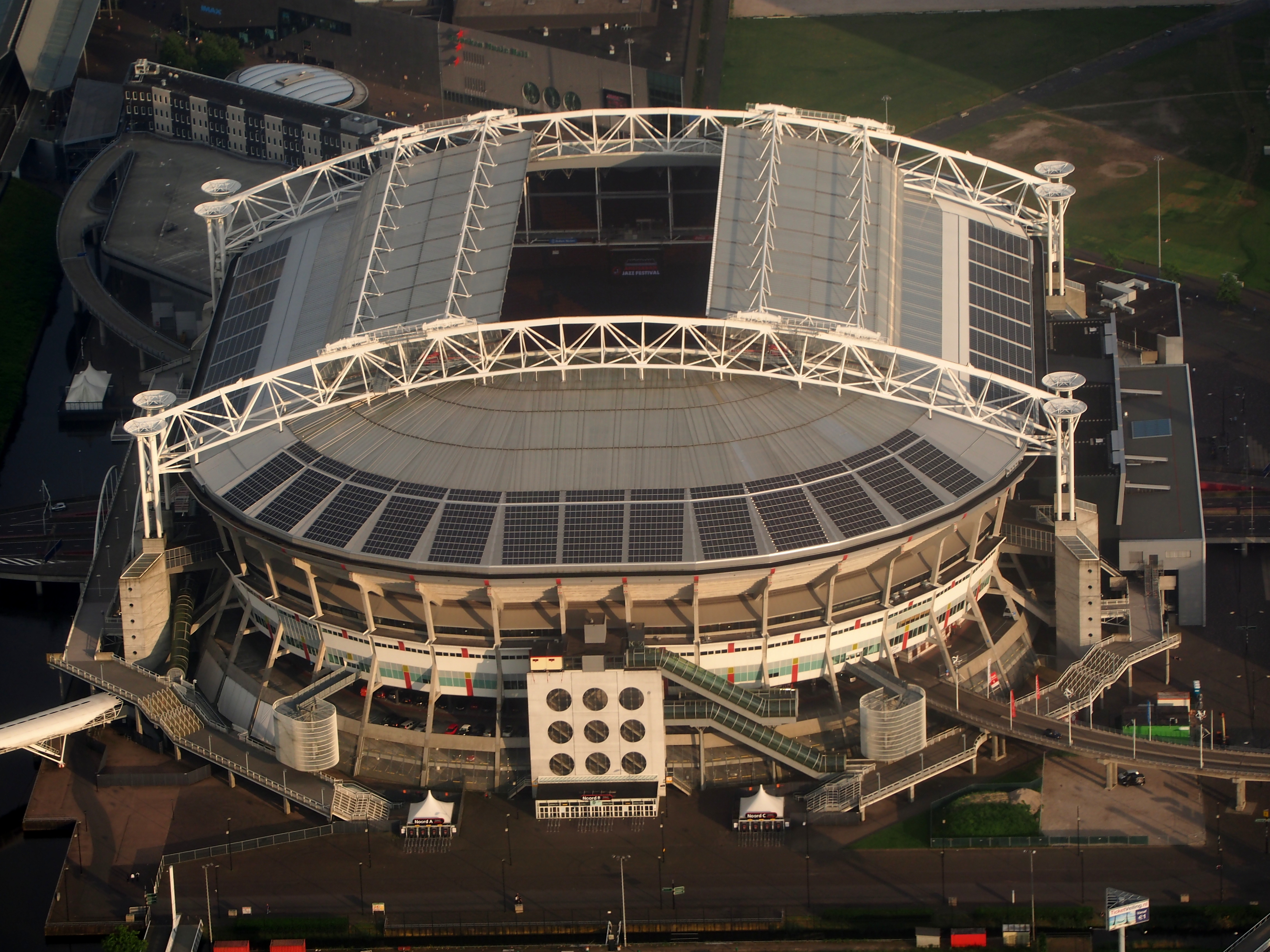
- UEFA
- Interactive map of Johan Cruyff Arena
- Full name: Johan Cruijff ArenA
- Former names: Amsterdam ArenA (1996–2018); Stadion Amsterdam (project name, 1993–1995)
- Location: ArenA Boulevard 1, 1101 AX Amsterdam, Netherlands
- Coordinates: 52°18′51″N 4°56′31″E
- Owner: Gemeente Amsterdam; Stadion Amsterdam N.V.
- Capacity: 56,120 (2025); 71,000 (Music concerts)
- Executive suites: 76
- Roof: Retractable
- Surface: PlayMaster Hybrid Grass
- Field size: 105 x 68 m
- Public transit: Amsterdam Bijlmer ArenA station, Strandvliet metro station

Construction
- Built: 1993–1996
- Opened: 14 August 1996; 30 years ago
- Renovated: 2015–2020
- Cost: €140 million
- Architect: Rob Schuurman

Tenants
- Football; Ajax (Men) (1996–present); Netherlands national football team (Men) selected matches (1996–present); Ajax (Women) selected matches (2023–present); American Football; Amsterdam Admirals (1997–2007)

Website
- johancruijffarena.nl/en

The Johan Cruyff Arena (Dutch: Johan Cruijff Arena [ˈjoːɦɑŋ ˈkrœyf aːˌreːnaː]) is the home stadium of football club Ajax since its opening and the main stadium of the Dutch capital city of Amsterdam. Built from 1993 to 1996 at a cost equivalent to €140 million, it is the largest stadium in the country. The stadium opened as the Amsterdam Arena (stylised as Amsterdam ArenA) and it was officially renamed for the 2018–19 football season, in honour of Dutch footballer Johan Cruyff who died in 2016.

It hosted the 1998 UEFA Champions League final and was one of the stadiums used during UEFA Euro 2000, including the semi-final. The stadium also hosted three group stage matches and one match in the round of 16 of the UEFA Euro 2020. Furthermore the 2013 UEFA Europa League final was staged in the stadium as well.

Both international and Dutch artists have given concerts in the stadium, including Tina Turner, Coldplay, U2, Take That, Celine Dion, Madonna, Michael Jackson, André Hazes, David Bowie, AC/DC, Justin Timberlake, One Direction, the Rolling Stones, Beyoncé, Rihanna, Taylor Swift and Armin van Buuren. The dance event Sensation was held in the stadium every year, up until the final edition in 2017.

The stadium has a retractable roof and a grass surface. Since 2022, the stadium has a capacity of 56,120 during football matches, increased from 54,990. The stadium has a capacity of 71,000 during music concerts if a center-stage setup is used; for end-stage music concerts, the capacity is 50,000; and for music concerts for which the stage is located in the east side of the stadium, the capacity is 35,000. It held UEFA five-star stadium status, which was superseded by a new system of classification.

== History ==
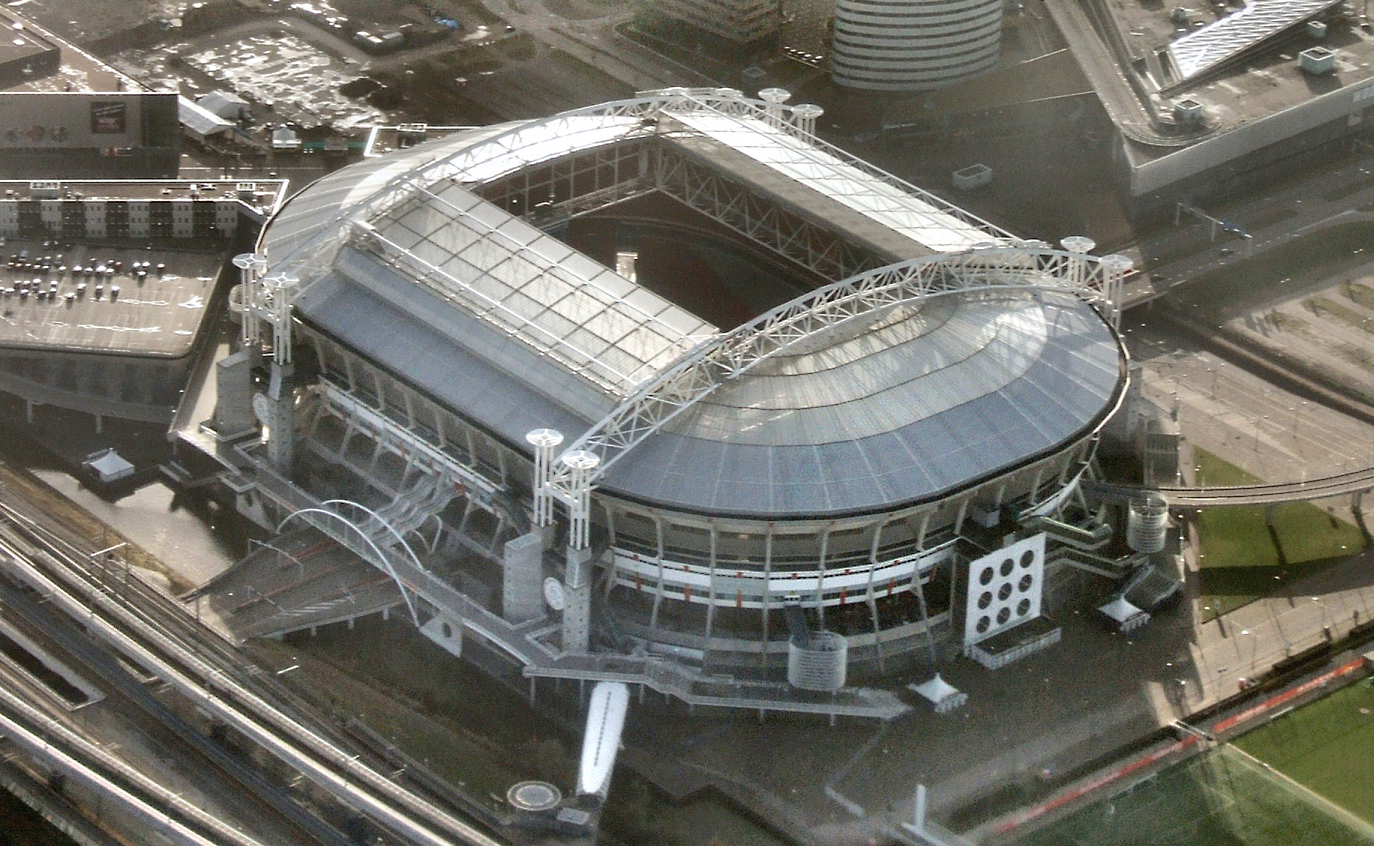

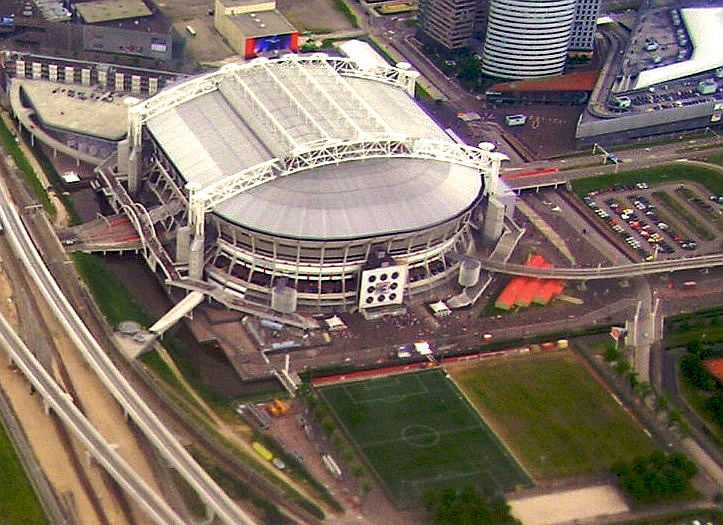
The Johan Cruyff Arena with the retractable roof opened and closed

Amsterdam was one of six cities that bid to host the 1992 Summer Olympics. In 1986, a new Olympic stadium was designed, with a football field and an athletics track. It was to be built in the area of Strandvliet in Amsterdam Zuidoost. After Amsterdam lost the bid to Barcelona in October 1986, the plans for the new stadium were abandoned. In 1987, the Stichting Amsterdam Sportstad (English: "Amsterdam Sports City Foundation") was established, which made new plans for a sports stadium with an all-seated capacity of 55,000. In 1990, a new design was made based on both previous designs, with a football field, an athletics track, and completely covered by a roof. By this time, Ajax needed a new stadium, as their previous home ground, De Meer, was far too small for most of Ajax's games. Since the late 1960s, Ajax had moved its most important games to Olympisch Stadion. Indeed, from the 1930s onward, Ajax had played most of their European fixtures and midweek night games at Olympisch Stadion.

Once more, the design was altered – the athletics track was removed, the capacity was reduced to 50,000 seats, and the fixed roof was replaced by a retractable roof. In 1992, the Government of Amsterdam authorised the plans for the stadium with a Transferium where people could transfer from their car to various forms of public transportation. In 1993, the Government of Amsterdam changed the development plan of the location and gave a permit to build the stadium.

The first pile of the deep foundation of the stadium was placed on 26 November 1993. The construction work, undertaken by Ballast Nedam and Royal BAM Group, took almost three years. The highest point of the building was reached on 24 February 1995, after the roof construction was raised. The fly-over from the public road to the parking facilities was opened on 13 March 1996. The stadium received 180,000 visitors during the construction work, until the stadium was closed from 1 July 1996 until the opening ceremony. The stadium was officially opened on 14 August 1996 by Queen Beatrix.

At the grand opening, the queen made a curtain fall inside the stadium. This revealed the world's largest painting De Zee (English: The Sea) of 80 by 126 meters (262 ft × 413 ft). Two-dimensional ships were placed on the sea representing the clubs in the Eredivisie. Trijntje Oosterhuis sang the hymn "De Zee", composed for the opening ceremony by John Ewbank. An eight-day torch relay with 375 runners over 1400 km through the Netherlands reached the stadium. The first runner was Johan Cruyff starting in the old stadium De Meer, and the last runner was Frank Rijkaard arriving in the new stadium. After the grass was revealed and the roof opened, an inaugural football friendly was played between Ajax and Milan, which Ajax lost 0–3. Tina Turner opened the stadium with three concerts with 160,000 people, from her world breaking Wildest Dreams Tour.

The construction of the stadium cost an equivalent of €140 million (at the time, the currency of the Netherlands was the Dutch guilder).

The stadium combines a retractable roof with a grass surface. This caused some problems in the beginning: the turf's grass would not grow in the shade of the open roof and was replaced 45 times in the first ten years.

=== Exterior renovation ===
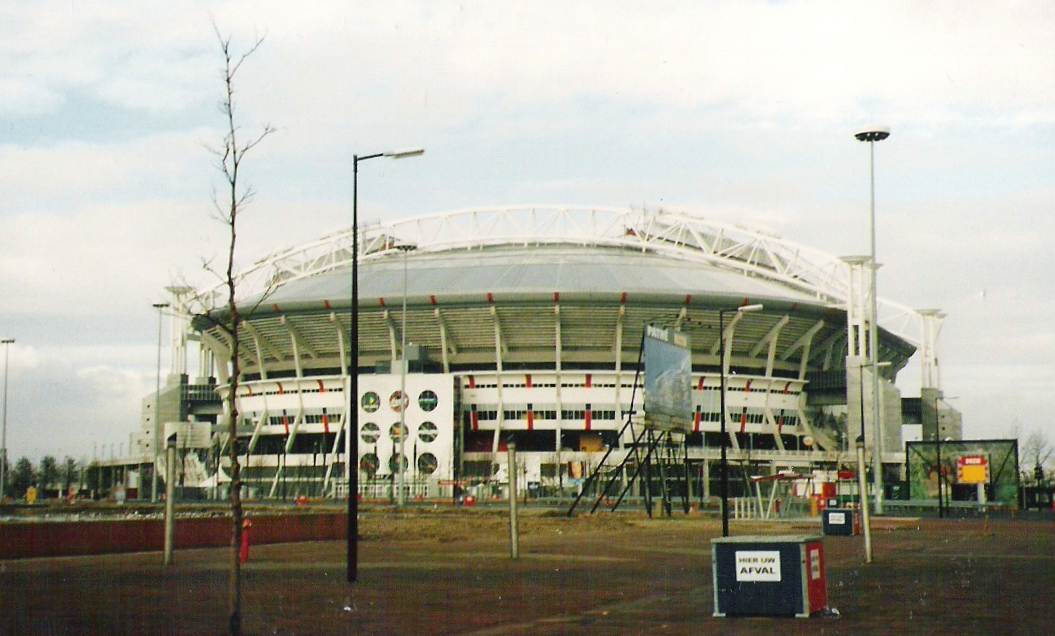
The Arena from outside (1996).

In September 2015, plans were presented to renovate the stadium's facade. The renovation should provide better quality and service to visitors by widening the walkway rings around the stadium, creating more room for the visitors and for new facilities (the number of seats remains the same). As a result, the outside of the stadium transforms from a concave shape to a convex shape, drastically altering its appearance. The renovation has only been completed on the east side in 2020, when four matches of the UEFA Euro 2020 championship were played in the Arena.

Construction works started in June 2017. The first phase is to renovate the east side of the stadium, where construction of the new facade was completed in April 2018.

=== Name change ===
Former stadium logo until 2018

On 25 April 2017, it was announced the Amsterdam Arena would be renamed to "Johan Cruijff Arena" in memory of Ajax legend Johan Cruyff. Later that year, on 9 August, it was stated the name change would take place on 25 October 2017. However, this was postponed as that date proved to be infeasible due to the many matters needing to be settled, such as arranging compensation for possible loss of income, transferring part of the shares from the municipality of Amsterdam to Ajax and having a discussion with the Cruyff family.

On 5 April 2018, it was announced the stadium would officially change name at the start of the 2018–19 football season. The stadium's new logo was revealed on 25 April 2018, the birthday of Johan Cruyff. According to the spokeswoman of Cruyff's family, the original Dutch spelling of his name (Cruijff) was chosen for the stadium's official name "to stay close to the Dutch Johan".

== Building and facilities ==
The stadium's original architect is the Dutchman Rob Schuurman. The original all-seated capacity was 54,990. After the 2019–20 season, but before Euro 2020, capacity was expanded by 660. The final increased capacity after the 2017-2021 renovation project is 56,120, an increase of 1,130. The original capacity during music concerts – the stadium's maximum capacity – is 68,000 visitors. The parking capacity of the Transferium is 500 cars (inside); there are an additional 12,000 parking spots outside.

The Johan Cruyff Arena is one of two stadiums in the Netherlands that is rated as Category 4 by UEFA, the other being the Feijenoord Stadion in Rotterdam.

The Ajax Museum is located in the stadium, which shows Ajax's more than 120 years of history.

The nearest train and subway (metro) station is Amsterdam Bijlmer Arena. The metro lines 50 and 54 (Amsterdam Central Station and city center) stop here.

== Sporting events ==
=== Association football ===
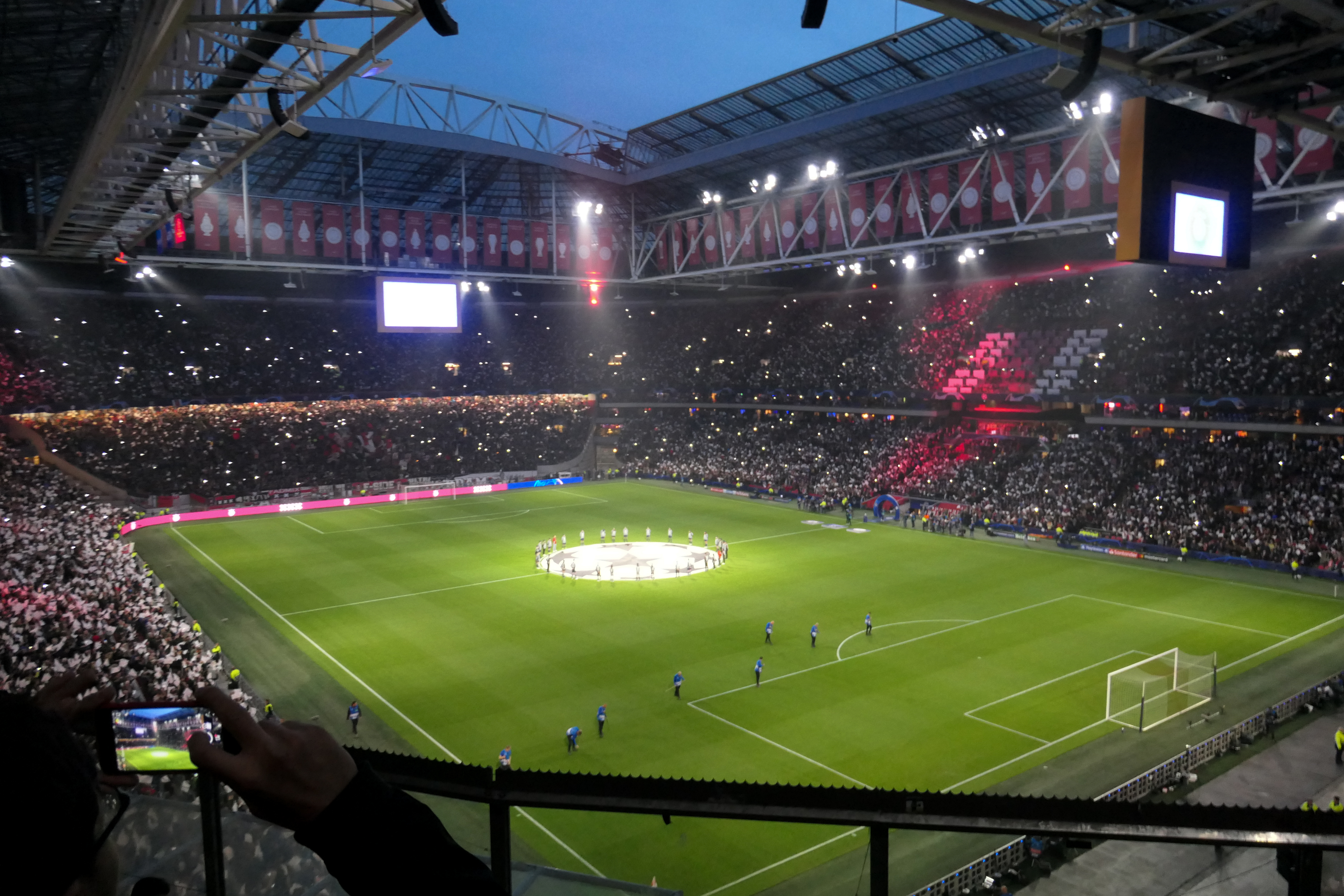
The Arena in Ajax's Champions League game in 2019 against Chelsea

The stadium is the home of Ajax for both Eredivisie and European matches. The inaugural match on 14 August 1996 was a friendly between the home team Ajax and AC Milan, which ended with a 3–0 win for Milan. The first goal was scored by Dejan Savićević. The first Ajax goal was scored by Kiki Musampa in the first competition match against NAC Breda in 21 August 1996.

The stadium hosted the 1998 UEFA Champions League final, where Real Madrid defeated Juventus due to an only goal by Predrag Mijatović. It was one of the venues of UEFA Euro 2000, including 3 group games, a quarter final and a semi-final. Also it hosted three group stage matches and one match in the round of 16 of the UEFA Euro 2020 held in 2021. Furthermore the stadium hosted the 2013 UEFA Europa League final, when Chelsea defeated Benfica by 2–1.

It hosts regularly Dutch national team (men) international matches, though the Netherlands does not have one dedicated national stadium for football.

After one friendly game in 2015, since 2023, the Arena regularly hosts matches of the Ajax Women team. The Klassieker home game against Feyenoord of that year was the first, with an attendance of 33,742 visitors. Every season since, the game is played in the stadium and since 2024 the Topper game against PSV Eindhoven is also played here. The home matches of the group stage of the 2023–24 UEFA Women's Champions League and the Quarter-final home game against Chelsea Women were all played at the stadium. The game against Chelsea recorded an attendance of 35,991 spectators, a record for a women's football game in the Netherlands.

The Netherlands Women’s national football team has to play a first game in the football stadium as of 2025. The team never played any football game in the stadium in the nations capital city so far.

The stadium regularly hosts pre-season friendlies of Ajax 1 (men) team. As well as in the past pre-season tournaments, such as the Amsterdam Tournament. Also in the past the stadium hosted different games of Ajax's reserve team (men).

==== Euro 2000 ====
| Date | Team 1 | Result | Team 2 | Round |
|---|---|---|---|---|
| 11 June 2000 | Netherlands | 1–0 | Czech Republic | Group D |
| 18 June 2000 | Slovenia | 1–2 | Spain | Group C |
| 21 June 2000 | France | 2–3 | Netherlands | Group D |
| 24 June 2000 | Turkey | 0–2 | Portugal | Quarter-finals |
| 29 June 2000 | Netherlands | 0–0 (a.e.t.) (1–3 p) | Italy | Semi-finals |

==== Euro 2020 ====
The stadium hosted three group stage matches and one round of 16 match at the UEFA Euro 2020, which was postponed to 2021 due to the COVID-19 pandemic in Europe. Also there was a smaller attendance because of this.

| Date | Team 1 | Result | Team 2 | Round | Attendance |
|---|---|---|---|---|---|
| 13 June 2021 | Netherlands | 3–2 | Ukraine | Group C | 15,837 |
| 17 June 2021 | Netherlands | 2–0 | Austria | Group C | 15,243 |
| 21 June 2021 | North Macedonia | 0–3 | Netherlands | Group C | 15,227 |
| 26 June 2021 | Wales | 0–4 | Denmark | Round of 16 | 14,645 |

=== American football ===
The stadium was home of the American football team Amsterdam Admirals of the NFL Europe, until the National Football League (NFL) ended its European competition in June 2007. The team played over 50 matches in the stadium from 1997 to 2007. World Bowl IX was played at the Arena in 2001, when the Berlin Thunder defeated the Barcelona Dragons.

=== Kickboxing ===
As kickboxing is a popular combat sport in the Netherlands, the It's Showtime and K-1 promotions have held a number of fight cards at the arena. Many of the sport's biggest stars such as Peter Aerts, Semmy Schilt, Badr Hari and Ernesto Hoost have fought there.

== Music events ==
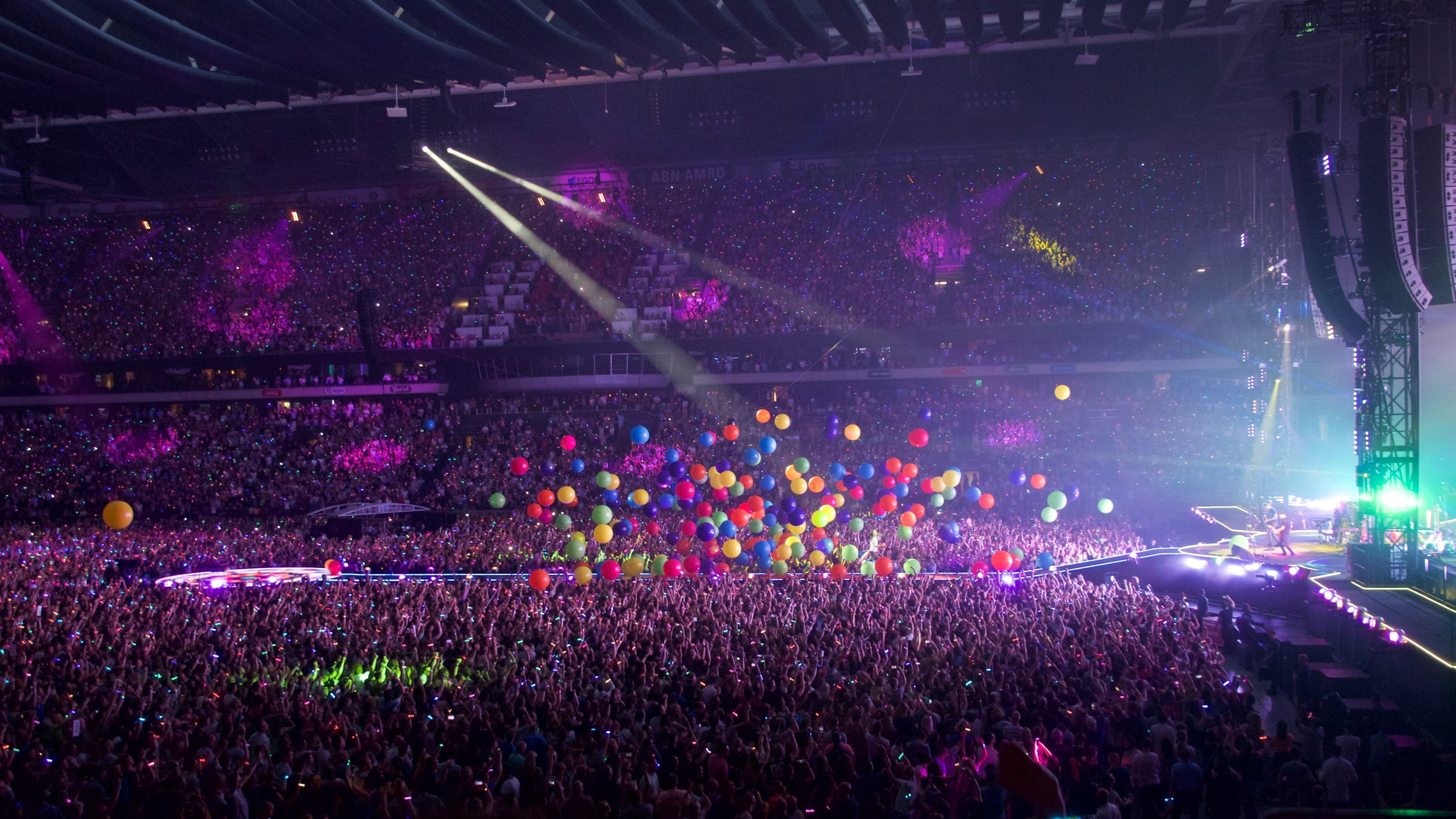
British rock band Coldplay performing at the stadium, as part of their A Head Full of Dreams Tour, in June 2016.

Dutch music group De Toppers have played annually at the venue since 2005. In total, they have sold out more than 50 concerts; no other act has performed at the stadium that many times. The arena was listed as a potential venue in Amsterdam's bid to host the 65th Eurovision Song Contest. However, the city later withdrew its bid due to venues, including the Johan Cruyff Arena, being fully booked.

Entertainment events held at the Johan Cruyff Arena
| Year | Date | Artists | Tour | Supporting Acts | Attendance | Box office | Ref. |
1996
| 1996 | 6 September | Tina Turner | Wildest Dreams Tour | —N/a | —N/a | | |
| 1996 | 7 September | Tina Turner | Wildest Dreams Tour | —N/a | —N/a | | |
| 1996 | 8 September | Tina Turner | Wildest Dreams Tour | —N/a | —N/a | | |
| 1996 | 28 September | Michael Jackson | HIStory World Tour | —N/a | 250,000 / 250,000 | —N/a | |
| 1996 | 30 September | Michael Jackson | HIStory World Tour | —N/a | 250,000 / 250,000 | —N/a | |
| 1996 | 2 October | Michael Jackson | HIStory World Tour | —N/a | 250,000 / 250,000 | —N/a | |
| 1997 | | Michael Jackson | HIStory World Tour | —N/a | 250,000 / 250,000 | —N/a | |
| 1997 | 8 June | Michael Jackson | HIStory World Tour | —N/a | 250,000 / 250,000 | —N/a | |
| 1997 | 10 June | Michael Jackson | HIStory World Tour | —N/a | 250,000 / 250,000 | —N/a | |
| 1997 | 18 June | Celine Dion | Falling into You: Around the World | —N/a | —N/a | | |
1998
| 1998 | 29 June | The Rolling Stones | Bridges to Babylon Tour | Dave Matthews Band | 261,277 / 261,277 | $11,094,308 | |
| 1998 | 1 July | The Rolling Stones | Bridges to Babylon Tour | Dave Matthews Band | 261,277 / 261,277 | $11,094,308 | |
| 1998 | 2 July | The Rolling Stones | Bridges to Babylon Tour | Dave Matthews Band | 261,277 / 261,277 | $11,094,308 | |
| 1998 | 5 July | The Rolling Stones | Bridges to Babylon Tour | Dave Matthews Band | 261,277 / 261,277 | $11,094,308 | |
| 1998 | 6 July | The Rolling Stones | Bridges to Babylon Tour | Dave Matthews Band | 261,277 / 261,277 | $11,094,308 | |
1999
| 1999 | 5 June | Backstreet Boys | Into the Millennium Tour | —N/a | —N/a | | |
| 1999 | 14 June | Celine Dion | Let's Talk About Love World Tour | —N/a | 64,652 / 64,652 | $3,048,136 | |
2001
| 2001 | 5 June | Bon Jovi | One Wild Night Tour | —N/a | —N/a | | |
| 2001 | 6 June | Bon Jovi | One Wild Night Tour | —N/a | —N/a | | |
2003
| 2003 | 3 June | Bon Jovi | Bounce Tour | —N/a | —N/a | | |
| 2003 | 17 July | Robbie Williams | Weekends of Mass Distraction | —N/a | —N/a | | |
| 2003 | 18 July | Robbie Williams | Weekends of Mass Distraction | —N/a | —N/a | | |
| 2003 | 19 August | The Rolling Stones | Licks Tour | —N/a | —N/a | | |
| 2003 | 22 September | The Rolling Stones | Licks Tour | —N/a | —N/a | | |
2004
| 2004 | 11 June | David Bowie | A Reality Tour | —N/a | —N/a | | |
2005
| 2005 | 13 July | U2 | Vertigo Tour | The Killers; Snow Patrol; Kaiser Chiefs; The Music; Athlete | 165,516 / 165,516 | $13,022,200 | |
| 2005 | 15 July | U2 | Vertigo Tour | The Killers; Snow Patrol; Kaiser Chiefs; The Music; Athlete | 165,516 / 165,516 | $13,022,200 | |
| 2005 | 16 July | U2 | Vertigo Tour | The Killers; Snow Patrol; Kaiser Chiefs; The Music; Athlete | 165,516 / 165,516 | $13,022,200 | |
2006
| 2006 | 21 June | Robbie Williams | Close Encounters Tour | —N/a | —N/a | | |
| 2006 | 22 June | Robbie Williams | Close Encounters Tour | —N/a | —N/a | | |
| 2006 | 24 June | Robbie Williams | Close Encounters Tour | —N/a | —N/a | | |
| 2006 | 25 June | Robbie Williams | Close Encounters Tour | —N/a | —N/a | | |
| 2006 | 31 July | The Rolling Stones | A Bigger Bang Tour | Toots and the Maytals | —N/a | | |
| 2006 | 3 September | Madonna | Confessions Tour | Paul Oakenfold | 102,330 / 102,330 | $11,783,254 | |
| 2006 | 4 September | Madonna | Confessions Tour | Paul Oakenfold | 102,330 / 102,330 | $11,783,254 | |
2007
| 2007 | 16 June | Justin Timberlake | FutureSex/LoveShow | —N/a | —N/a | | |
| 2007 | 1 July | Genesis | Turn It On Again: The Tour | —N/a | 52,622 / 52,622 | $3,819,127 | |
2008
| 2008 | 2 June | Celine Dion | Taking Chances World Tour | The Storys | 46,969 / 52,772 | $4,565,126 | |
| 2008 | 13 June | Bon Jovi | Lost Highway Tour | —N/a | 34,512 / 34,512 | $2,817,625 | |
| 2008 | 18 June | Bruce Springsteen | Magic Tour | —N/a | 36,257 / 36,529 | $4,370,497 | |
| 2008 | 2 September | Madonna | Sticky & Sweet Tour | Robyn | 50,588 / 50,588 | $6,717,734 | |
| 2008 | 11 October | Kinderen voor Kinderen | Kinderen voor Kinderen Mega Spektakel | —N/a | —N/a | | |
2009
| 2009 | 23 June | AC/DC | Black Ice World Tour | The Answer; Drive Like Maria | 50,541 / 50,541 | $4,361,233 | |
| 2009 | 20 July | U2 | U2 360° Tour | Snow Patrol | 125,866 / 125,866 | $12,583,998 | |
| 2009 | 21 July | U2 | U2 360° Tour | Snow Patrol | 125,866 / 125,866 | $12,583,998 | |
2011
| 2011 | 18 July | Take That | Progress Live | Pet Shop Boys | —N/a | | |
2013
| 2013 | 4 June | Muse | The 2nd Law World Tour | Biffy Clyro; Bastille | —N/a | | |
| 2013 | 13 July | Robbie Williams | Take the Crown Stadium Tour | Olly Murs | —N/a | | |
| 2013 | 8 September | Roger Waters | The Wall Live | —N/a | 47,414 / 47,500 | $4,257,133 | |
2014
| 2014 | 24 June | One Direction | Where We Are | 5 Seconds of Summer | 103,551 / 103,551 | $7,859,850 | |
| 2014 | 25 June | One Direction | Where We Are | 5 Seconds of Summer | 103,551 / 103,551 | $7,859,850 | |
2016
| 2016 | 17 June | Rihanna | Anti World Tour | Big Sean; DJ Mustard | 50,513 / 50,932 | $3,525,469 | |
| 2016 | 23 June | Coldplay | A Head Full of Dreams Tour | Lianne La Havas; Alessia Cara | 104,511 / 104,511 | $8,759,000 | |
| 2016 | 24 June | Coldplay | A Head Full of Dreams Tour | Lianne La Havas; Alessia Cara | 104,511 / 104,511 | $8,759,000 | |
| 2016 | 16 July | Beyoncé | The Formation World Tour | Chloe x Halle; Ingrid | 49,436 / 49,436 | $4,712,051 | |
2017
| 2017 | 13 May | Armin van Buuren | —N/a | Eller van Buuren; Gavin DeGraw; Kensington; Mr. Probz; Trevor Guthrie | —N/a | | |
| 2017 | 29 July | U2 | The Joshua Tree Tour 2017 | Noel Gallagher's High Flying Birds | 104,708 / 104,708 | $11,544,870 | |
| 2017 | 30 July | U2 | The Joshua Tree Tour 2017 | Noel Gallagher's High Flying Birds | 104,708 / 104,708 | $11,544,870 | |
| 2017 | 30 September | The Rolling Stones | No Filter Tour | De Staat | 54,791 / 54,791 | $8,762,079 | |
2018
| 2018 | 19 June | Beyoncé; Jay-Z | On the Run II Tour | DeeJay Abstract | 97,869 / 97,869 | $9,755,499 | |
| 2018 | 20 June | Beyoncé; Jay-Z | On the Run II Tour | DJ Flava | 97,869 / 97,869 | $9,755,499 | |
2019
| 2019 | 11 June | Metallica | WorldWired Tour | Ghost; Bokassa | 50,576 / 50,576 | $5,151,429 | |
2022
| 2022 | 7 July | The Rolling Stones | Sixty | Ghost Hounds | 51,592 / 51,592 | $9,241,437 | |
| 2022 | 14 July | Ed Sheeran | +–=÷× Tour | Maisie Peters; Cat Burns | 134,119 / 134,119 | $8,611,476 | |
| 2022 | 15 July | Ed Sheeran | +–=÷× Tour | Maisie Peters; Cat Burns | 134,119 / 134,119 | $8,611,476 | |
2023
| 2023 | 27 April | Metallica | M72 World Tour | Architects; Mammoth WVH | 117,671 / 129,451 | $10,691,363 | |
| 2023 | 29 April | Metallica | M72 World Tour | Ice Nine Kills; Floor Jansen | 117,671 / 129,451 | $10,691,363 | |
| 2023 | 25 May | Bruce Springsteen; E Street Band | 2023 Tour | —N/a | | | |
| 2023 | 27 May | Bruce Springsteen; E Street Band | 2023 Tour | —N/a | | | |
| 2023 | 4 June | Harry Styles | Love On Tour | Wet Leg | 154,903 / 154,903 | $16,498,991 | |
| 2023 | 5 June | Harry Styles | Love On Tour | Wet Leg | 154,903 / 154,903 | $16,498,991 | |
| 2023 | 6 June | Harry Styles | Love On Tour | Wet Leg | 154,903 / 154,903 | $16,498,991 | |
| 2023 | 17 June | Beyoncé | Renaissance World Tour | —N/a | 97,657 / 97,657 | $12,817,577 | |
| 2023 | 18 June | Beyoncé | Renaissance World Tour | —N/a | 97,657 / 97,657 | $12,817,577 | |
| 2023 | 23 June | The Weeknd | After Hours til Dawn Tour | Kaytranada; Mike Dean | 103,181 / 103,181 | $10,066,993 | |
| 2023 | 24 June | The Weeknd | After Hours til Dawn Tour | Kaytranada; Mike Dean | 103,181 / 103,181 | $10,066,993 | |
| 2023 | 15 July | Coldplay | Music of the Spheres World Tour | Griff; Zoë Tauran | 217,609 / 217,609 | $30,322,573 | |
| 2023 | 16 July | Coldplay | Music of the Spheres World Tour | Griff; Zoë Tauran | 217,609 / 217,609 | $30,322,573 | |
| 2023 | 18 July | Coldplay | Music of the Spheres World Tour | Griff; Zoë Tauran | 217,609 / 217,609 | $30,322,573 | |
| 2023 | 19 July | Coldplay | Music of the Spheres World Tour | Griff; Zoë Tauran | 217,609 / 217,609 | $30,322,573 | |
| 2024 | 9 June | Burna Boy | I Told Them Tour | | | | |
| 2024 | 4 July | Taylor Swift | The Eras Tour | Paramore | | | |
| 2024 | 5 July | Taylor Swift | The Eras Tour | Paramore | | | |
| 2024 | 6 July | Taylor Swift | The Eras Tour | Paramore | | | |
| 2024 | 10 July | Pink | Pink Summer Carnival | Gayle; KidCutUp; The Script | 105,432 / 105,432 | $13,558,468 | |
| 2024 | 11 July | Pink | Pink Summer Carnival | Gayle; KidCutUp; The Script | 105,432 / 105,432 | $13,558,468 | |
2025
| 2025 | 8 June | Chris Brown | Breezy Bowl XX | Bryson Tiller | 49,735 / 49,735 | $5,355,379 | |
| 2025 | 22 June | Robbie Williams | Robbie Williams Live 2025 | Davina Michelle | | | |
| 2025 | 23 June | Robbie Williams | Robbie Williams Live 2025 | Davina Michelle | | | |
| 2025 | 11 July | Stray Kids | Dominate World Tour | | | | |
| 2025 | 13 July | Kendrick Lamar; SZA | Grand National Tour | Mustard | 49,689 / 49,689 | $7,167,970 | |
2026
| 2026 | 16 May | Harry Styles | Together, Together | Robyn | | | |
| 2026 | 17 May | Harry Styles | Together, Together | Robyn | | | |
| 2026 | 20 May | Harry Styles | Together, Together | Robyn | | | |
| 2026 | 22 May | Harry Styles | Together, Together | Robyn | | | |
| 2026 | 23 May | Harry Styles | Together, Together | Robyn | | | |
| 2026 | 26 May | Harry Styles | Together, Together | Robyn | | | |
| 2026 | 29 May | Harry Styles | Together, Together | Robyn | | | |
| 2026 | 30 May | Harry Styles | Together, Together | Robyn | | | |
| 2026 | 4 June | Harry Styles | Together, Together | Robyn | | | |
| 2026 | 5 June | Harry Styles | Together, Together | Robyn | | | |
| 2026 | 2 July | Bruno Mars | The Romantic Tour | DJ Pee .Wee & Victoria Monét | | | |
| 2026 | 4 July | Bruno Mars | The Romantic Tour | DJ Pee .Wee & Victoria Monét | | | |
| 2026 | 5 July | Bruno Mars | The Romantic Tour | DJ Pee .Wee & Victoria Monét | | | |
| 2026 | 7 July | Bruno Mars | The Romantic Tour | DJ Pee .Wee & Victoria Monét | | | |
| 2026 | 16 July | The Weeknd | After Hours til Dawn Tour | Playboi Carti | | | |
| 2026 | 17 July | The Weeknd | After Hours til Dawn Tour | Playboi Carti | | | |
| 2026 | 18 July | The Weeknd | After Hours til Dawn Tour | Playboi Carti | | | |
2027
| 2027 | 10 July | Karol G | Viajando Por El Mundo Tropitour | | / | | |

== See also ==
- Halte Amsterdam ArenA
- Football in the Netherlands
- Lists of stadiums

| Preceded by Olympiastadion; Munich | UEFA Champions League; Final venue 1998 | Succeeded by Camp Nou; Barcelona |
| Preceded by Arena Națională; Bucharest | UEFA Europa League; Final venue 2013 | Succeeded by Juventus Stadium; Turin |
