= We gaan naar Rome =

Single by Simon Tahamata
- B-side: "Hallo mensen, hier is Rome"
- Released: 1979
- Genre: Schlager
- Label: GIP
- Composer: Ferry van Delden
- Lyricists: Cock Van Raayen, Ferry van Delden, A.H. Willemsen
- Producer: Cock Van Raayen

"We gaan naar Rome" (English: We're going to Rome) is a Schlager song by Simon Tahamata an association football player, who played for AFC Ajax and the Netherlands national team at the time of release which was in 1979 on Dutch label GIP. The song was originally performed by singer Willy Derby for the 1934 World Cup in Italy. Tahamata's version contains altered lyrics to fit the context of the then-upcoming UEFA Euro 1980, which was also held in Italy. The song is the A-side to the record "We gaan naar Rome / Hallo mensen, hier is Rome" which was released as a 7"-single.

The song was released prospectively in regard to the UEFA Euro 1980, following the Netherlands' qualification to the finals amongst the last eight of the tournament. Ajax star Simon Tahamata recorded this record implying the Dutch would reach the final hosted at the Stadio Olimpico in Rome. The Netherlands lost their first two matches to Greece and West Germany while beating Czechoslovakia in their last match, finishing third in their group and thus failing to advance past the group stage.

Having played an important role in the qualification process, he would however miss the final tournament in Italy due to an injury.
