= Willy Alberti =

Dutch singer (1926–1985)

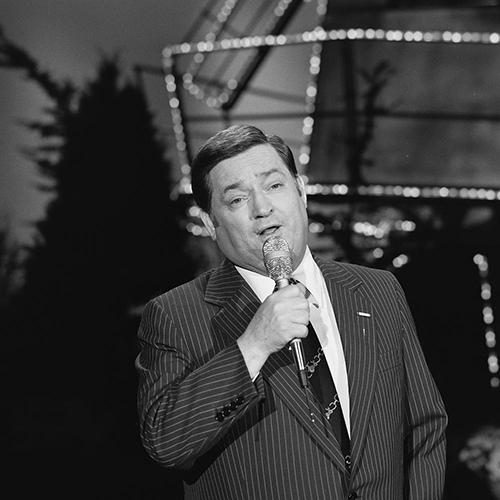
Alberti performing in 1980

Carel Verbrugge (14 October 1926 – 18 February 1985), known as Willy Alberti, was a Dutch singer, who sang in Dutch and Italian. He was also an actor and a radio and TV personality.

Alberti was born in Amsterdam as the third of eight children to Jacobus Wilhelm Verbrugge and Sophia Jacoba van Musscher. He sang with family members at a very young age.

He began recording professionally in the early 1940s. In 1944 he married Ria Kuiper, and his daughter Willeke Alberti, later to become a successful Dutch vocalist herself, was born in 1945. After the war Alberti established himself in the Netherlands with Italian songs; he became increasingly popular in the 1950s, when he had a string of hits beginning with Nel blu dipinto di blu in 1958. In the 1960s he began to act alongside his daughter Willeke; as a duo, they also scored hits on the Dutch charts. From 1965 father and daughter presented a popular monthly television show for the AVRO. Alberti won two Edison Awards in the 1960s.

In the 1970s, Alberti's fame began to decline, though he did score a few more hits. In 1984, Alberti was diagnosed with liver cancer, and he died in Amsterdam on 18 February of the following year, aged 58. He was cremated at the Westgaarde Crematorium in Amsterdam.

== Dutch singles ==
Pre-Top 40

- Ik zing dit lied voor jou alleen 1946
- Veel mooier dan het mooiste schilderij 1946
- Droomland 1950 with Ans Heidendaal
- Ci-ciu-ci 1955
- Mijn sprookjesboek 1955
- Vivere 1955
- Nel blu dipinto di blu (Volare) 1958 #4
- Come prima 1958 #2
- Piove 1959 #1
- Li per li 1959
- Una marcia infa 1959 #3
- Marina 1959 #1 (US: Billboard: #42 Cash Box: #12)
- Romantica 1960 #14
- Quando quando quando 1962 #11
- Sei rimasta sola 1963 #8 with Willeke Alberti
- Sabato sera 1964 #44 with Willeke Alberti

Top 40

- Dat afgezaagde zinnetje 1967 #2 with Willeke Alberti
- Mooi Amsterdam 1968 with Wim Sonneveld
- De glimlach van een kind 1968 #26
- Ajax olé olé olé (je bent mijn glorie) 1969
- Chi-ri-bi-ri-bin pom pom pom 1969 with Willeke Alberti
- Een reisje langs de Rijn 1969 with Willeke Alberti
- We gaan naar Londen 1971 #17
- Juliana bedankt 1980 #18
- Niemand laat z'n eigen kind alleen 1983 #5 with Willeke Alberti
- Liefde 1987 #38
- De glimlach van een kind (new version) 1995 #34 with Willeke Alberti
- Jij bent het leven voor mij 1997 #32 with André Hazes
