= Levenslied =

Style of Dutch pop music

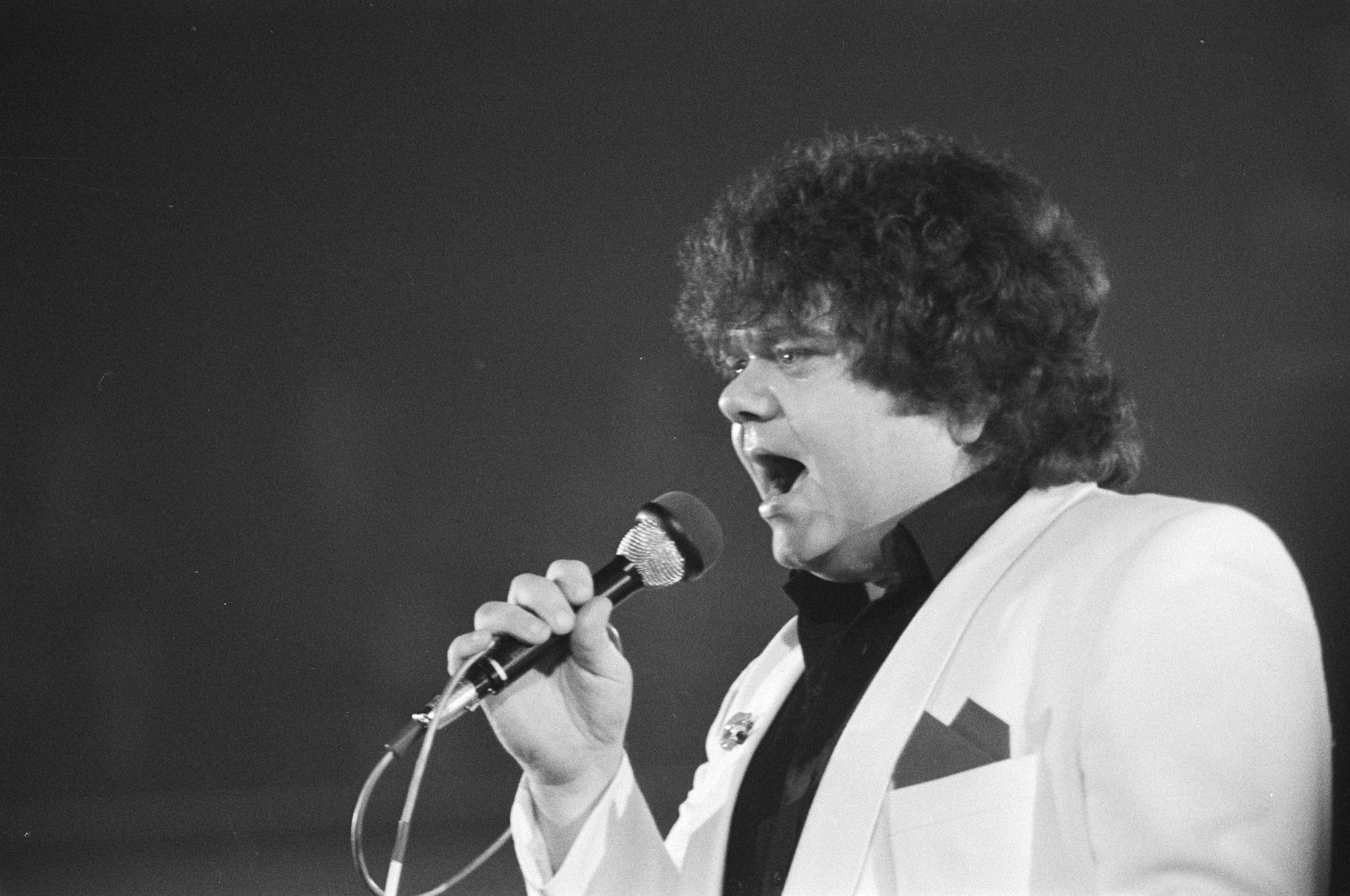
- André Hazes, a well known levenslied singer
- Stylistic origins: Pop; rock; Indorock
- Cultural origins: Early 1960s

Subgenres
- Levenslied; Nederbeat; Palingpop

Levenslied (Dutch, literally "life song" or "song about life") is a sentimental Dutch-language subgenre of popular music. Levenslied lyrics can be sweet or bitter, light and sentimental, but also reflective and dark, about subjects such as love, misery and far-away, sunny, exotic holiday places. The darker, more sentimental songs are also known as "smartlap" ("sorrow bandage", or tearjerker).

The levenslied is related to the chanson and the schlager. While historically associated with working-class audiences by artists like Johnny Jordaan, the genre's social status shifted significantly through the legacy of André Hazes. Often described as the "Dutch blues," Hazes' work brought a raw, emotional authenticity to the genre that eventually resonated across all social classes.

A typical levenslied has catchy, simple rhythms and melodies and is built up of couplets and refrains. Traditional musical instruments in levenslied music are the accordion and the barrel organ. Modern levenslied artists also use synthesizers and guitars. Modern performers like Marco Borsato, while sharing the sentimental themes, are generally categorized as Nederpop due to their more polished, contemporary pop production.

Three cities in the Netherlands, Breda, Tilburg and Nijmegen, have annual levenslied festivals. The genre's reach extends far beyond these local traditions. For over two decades, the touring event Muziekfeest op het Plein has brought the levenslied to public squares across the Netherlands, showcasing its regional popularity on a national scale. This evolution culminated in the "Muziekfeest van het Jaar," an arena-sized production hosted annually at the Ziggo Dome in Amsterdam. Broadcast on New Year's Eve, this event illustrates the genre's successful transition from localized folk music to a mainstream national celebration.

== Artists ==
Notable Dutch levenslied singers:

- Willy Alberti
- Willeke Alberti
- Frans Bauer
- Peter Blanker
- Renée de Haan
- André Hazes
- Stef Bos
- Johnny Jordaan
- Pierre Kartner
- Tante Leen
- Imca Marina
- Manke Nelis
- Dries Roelvink
- Sieneke
- Jan Smit
- Zangeres Zonder Naam

Notable Flemish levenslied singers:

- Eddy Wally
- Laura Lynn
- Will Tura
