= Jordaanlied =

Type of levenslied

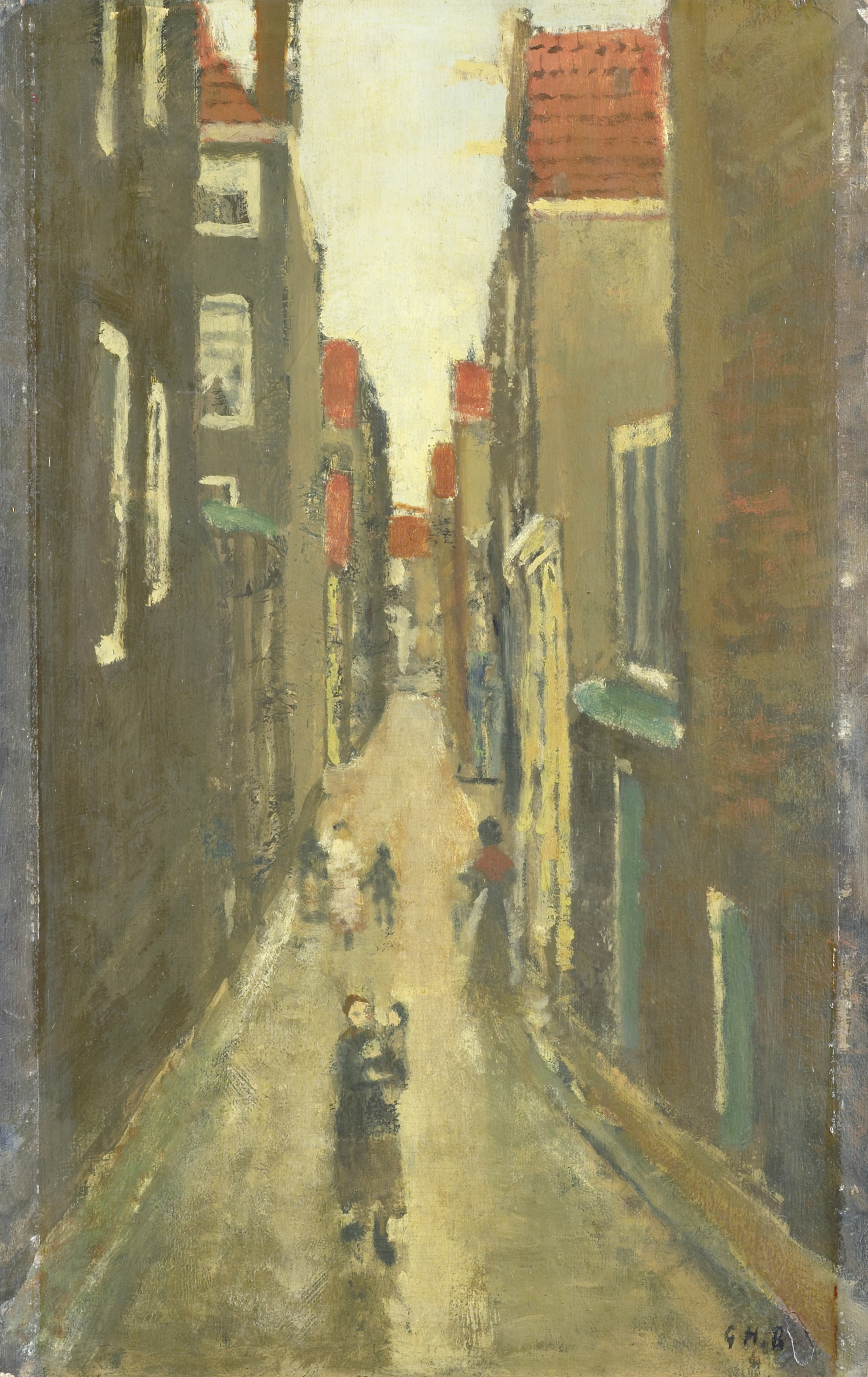
Jordaan neighborhood by Breitner.

The Jordaanlied ("Jordaan song") is a type of levenslied, the Dutch genre of nostalgic sentimental popular music; the Jordaanlied hails from and sings the praises of the Amsterdam neighborhood the Jordaan which, until the 1960s, was an impoverished working-class area. The genre first came to the fore in the late 19th century and reached extraordinary popularity in the 1950s, before becoming old-fashioned quickly when rock and roll came along. It continues to be sung in the now-yuppified Jordaan, as a local favorite and a tourist attraction in a profoundly changed neighborhood; already a nostalgic genre when it was first made popular, the situations it describes and the emotions it evokes are no longer directly accessible even by the older generations, a transformation due in part to the Jordaanlied itself.

== History ==
=== Until World War II ===
The first Jordaanlied, according to cabaret artist and historian Jacques Klöters, dates from 1897, and is a song called "Pietje Puck". The genre helped initiate and later perpetuate a myth of the Jordaan, Klöters argued, a myth of a world full of poor, hard-working, and fun-loving people who adhere to traditional values.

A second wave of popularity came during and after World War I, and was prompted by the work of Dutch writer Israël Querido, who had written a four-volume novel De Jordaan. A play inspired by Querido's characterization of Jordaners, as "hard workers, hard drinkers, working under terrible conditions and having their emotions only just below the surface", was a big hit: Herman Boubers' Mooie Neel (1916) was the story of a factory girl who is seduced by her boss and left with the consequences. Boubers wrote a second play, this time with songs written in collaboration with Louis Davids, one of the greatest artists in cabaret in the Netherlands, whom Boubers had met by chance in a cafe on the Rembrandtplein, one of the city's main entertainment areas. Davids composed a number of Jordaan-themed songs (though he was a Rotterdammer) with his then-girlfriend, the English singer and actress Margie Morris, for the enormously popular Bleeke Bet (1917) which had the Jordaan as background and topic. One of the play's songs, "O oude mooie toren", later specified as "O mooie Westertoren", became the area's first "anthem".

Boubers followed the overwhelming success of Bleeke Bet with more of the same, including songs by Davids and Morris; Oranje Hein (1919) and De Jantjes (1920) were just as successful and made him a rich man (he bought himself a motorboat called De Jantjes). In the 1930s, with the advent of cinema, his plays were made into films; singer Johan Heesters and actress Fien de la Mar were the most popular stars of the time, and practically every successful Dutch movie of the era was set in Amsterdam, a theme continued until the outbreak of World War II. According to Henk van Gelder, popular Dutch sentiment seemed to identify completely with Amsterdam and especially de Jordaan.

=== The 1950s and after ===
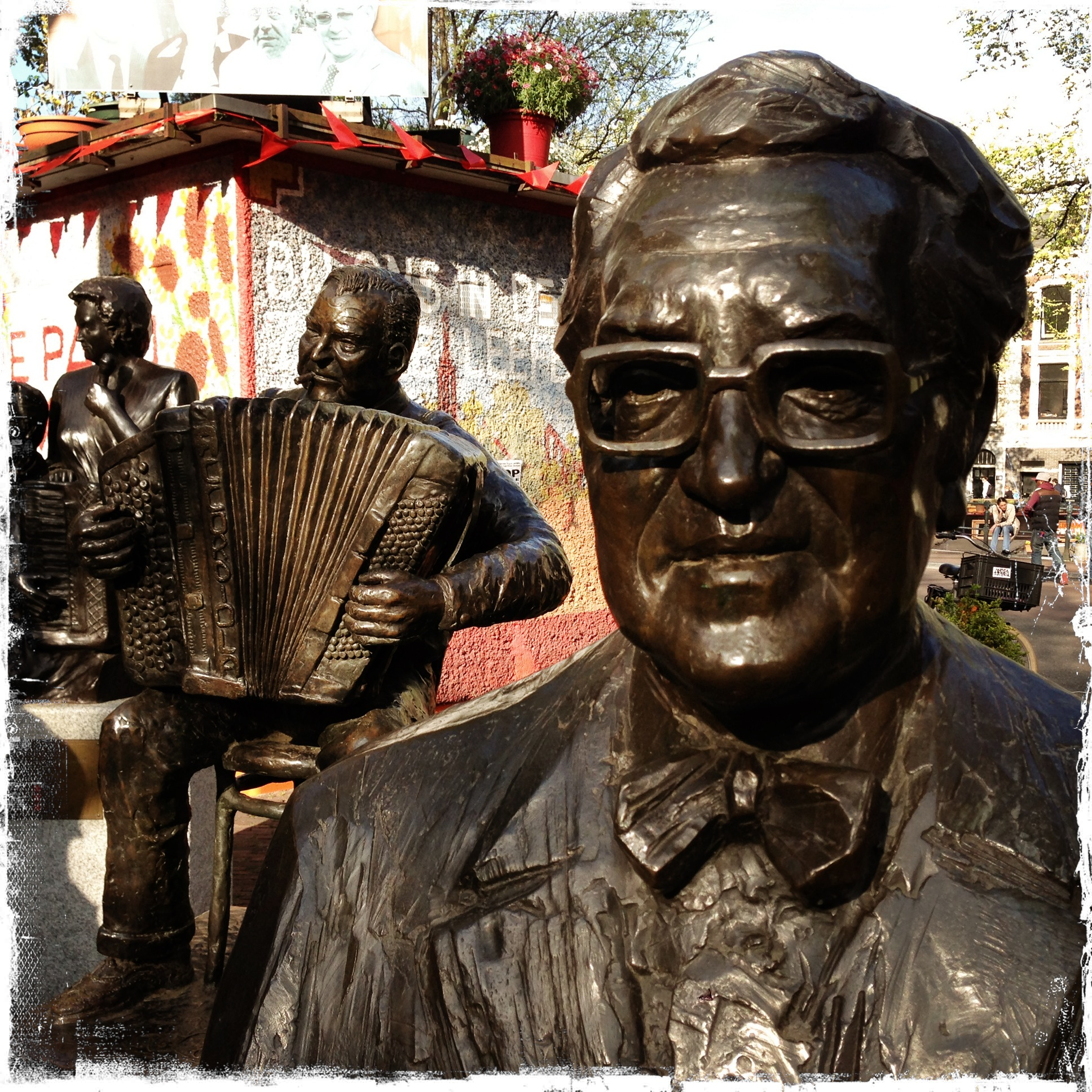
Statue of Johnny Jordaan with Johnny Meijer in the background on the Johnny Jordaanplein, Amsterdam. Photo by Nils Emmink, Amsterdam.

The Jordaanlied was again popular after World War II and peaked in the 1950s, finally beginning to be accepted in mainstream national culture; notable singers in the genre of that era were Johnny Jordaan (the "uncrowned king of the Jordaanlied"), Willy Alberti, Tante Leen, Zwarte Riek, and Manke Nelis. That surge in the 1950s began with a cabaret artist and two songwriters. The cabaret artist was Wim Sonneveld, who early in the 1950s developed a character called Willem Parel for his Saturday evening radio show; Parel was a barrel organ player from the Jordaan, who made Sonneveld achieve stardom. Sonneveld came from Utrecht and his Amsterdam dialect was clearly imitative, but he did pave the way for a national audience to accept the Jordaan dialect and themes again. At the same time, two songwriters from Amsterdam, Henk Voogt ("Henvo") and Louis Noiret (real name Louis Schwarz), developed the actual Jordaanlied; two of their songs, "Bij ons in de Jordaan" and "De parel van de Jordaan", were performed by Henk Berlips at a Jordaan festival in September 1954 to great acclaim. At the time, no record company showed any interest for a kind of music because they thought it lacked national appeal, but Henvo and Louis Noret managed to get Ger Oord, the manager of the record company Bovema, to sponsor a talent show and offer the winner a contract. The finals of that talent show were held on 2 March 1955 in Hotel Krasnapolsky, and were won by a singing bartender, Jan van Musscher, also known as Johnny Jordaan. Helena Jansen-Polder, better known as Tante Leen, finished second.

Johnny Jordaan recorded "Bij ons in de Jordaan" and "De parel van de Jordaan" two days later, and the single was an instant success. The real breakthrough, though, was "Geef mij maar Amsterdam", a Pi Vèriss composition that Johnny Jordaan recorded the same year. In all, Bovema sold 360,000 records in 1955. Jordaan and Tante Leen became stars, and the entire country was ready to embrace the Jordaanlied. Still considered a low-brow genre, it was boycotted by a number of radio stations in the pillarized Dutch society of the period after World War II, including the socialist VARA; only the AVRO played this music in the 1950s. The artists from the 1950s, though, relied for their music and repertoire on the style of the period between the wars without making any significant changes, even while rock and roll and blues were on the way to take over popular culture. In addition, the Jordaanlied helped make the area so popular that since the 1960s it has gentrified completely; many of the lower-income classes have moved out of the city altogether, and the Jordaan is now largely inhabited by yuppies and professionals. Changing musical tastes in the 1960s and 1970s ended the widespread popularity of the genre, though it continues to play a part in the Jordaan's culture and is a significant tourist attraction.

== Themes and style ==
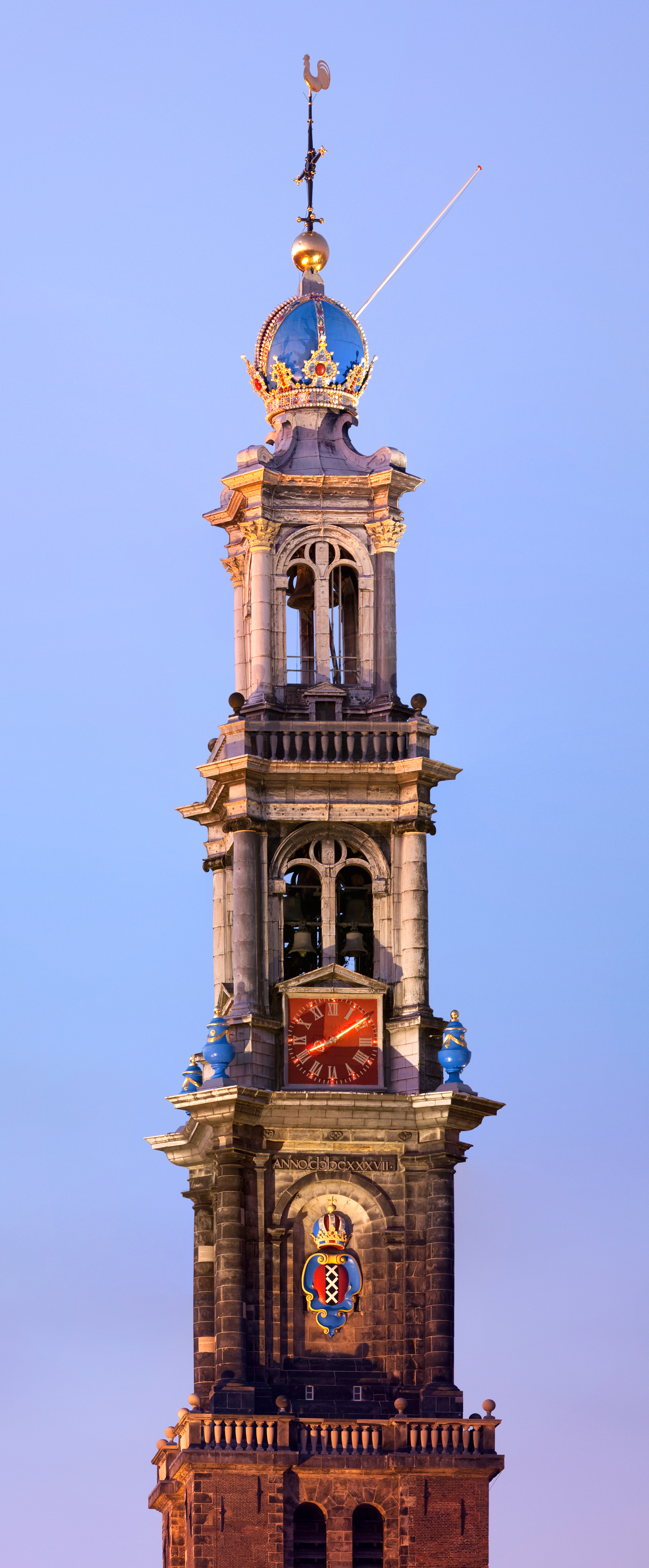
Spire of the Westertoren.

=== Musical background ===
Musically, the Jordaanlied leans on the tradition of the 19th-century cabaret, and especially on the Italian style of opera which was very popular in the area, borrowing "chords, rhythms, melodies, and ways of singing". Willy Alberti, for instance, began his career singing Italian songs. Another notable influence during the 1950s was the swing repertoire, with lyrics in Dutch.

Instrumentation is traditional, and the accordion plays an important role; important accordion players were Harry de Groot and Johnny Meijer, the latter having a statue behind Johnny Jordaan on the Johnny Jordaanplein in Amsterdam.

=== Nostalgia ===
The Jordaanlied usually treats the past nostalgically; this past is a working-class history, the Jordaan having been deeply impoverished since the middle of the 19th century. In the songs, laborers and their families work hard and remain poor, but nonetheless, "Jordaners hop singing through life, despite poverty and misery". One particular profession that figures in the genre is shelling shrimp, a job done by many women of the area in the 19th and 20th centuries, as in "Grote garnalen" by Henvo and Louis Noret:

Ik zit aan de stal in het hart der Jordaan
En ik pel voor m'n brood de garnalen
Dat heb m'n familie al jaren gedaan
Dat waren zo hun idealen.

("I sit at my stall in the heart of the Jordaan, shelling shrimp for a living; my family has done that for years, that was their ideal")

As Klöters argues, that world was already gone by the time the Jordaanlied reached the height of its popularity and for the 1950s singers was little more than nostalgia for their youth; he sees this sentimentality it as a reaction to the threat posed by the fast-changing world of the post-World War II period, a nostalgia for a "safer" period. Van Gelder adds that 1955 was the year rock and roll was introduced from the United States to the Netherlands, and the same year a new word for young people, Nozem, was coined to indicate a new and completely different youth culture.

=== The Westertoren ===
The Westertoren, the spire of the Westerkerk, symbolizes the area and plays an important role in the music--in 1917's Bleeke Bet, in the songs of Johan Heesters from the 1930s, and in many Jordaanliederen of the 1950s. "Real" Jordaners have to be born within earshot of the tower's carillon. "Aan de voet van die ouwe Wester" ("At the foot of that old Wester") is the title of one of Willy Alberti's greatest hits. The Westertoren is referred to as "De parel van de Jordaan" ("The pearl of the Jordaan"), also the subject and title of Johnny Jordaan's first big hit—and he himself came to be called "Parel van de Jordaan". Poet and writer Willem Wilmink remarked that the Westertoren is revered as a stand-in for God.

== See also ==
- Aan de Amsterdamse grachten
- List of songs about Amsterdam
