= Elandsgracht =

Canal in Amsterdam

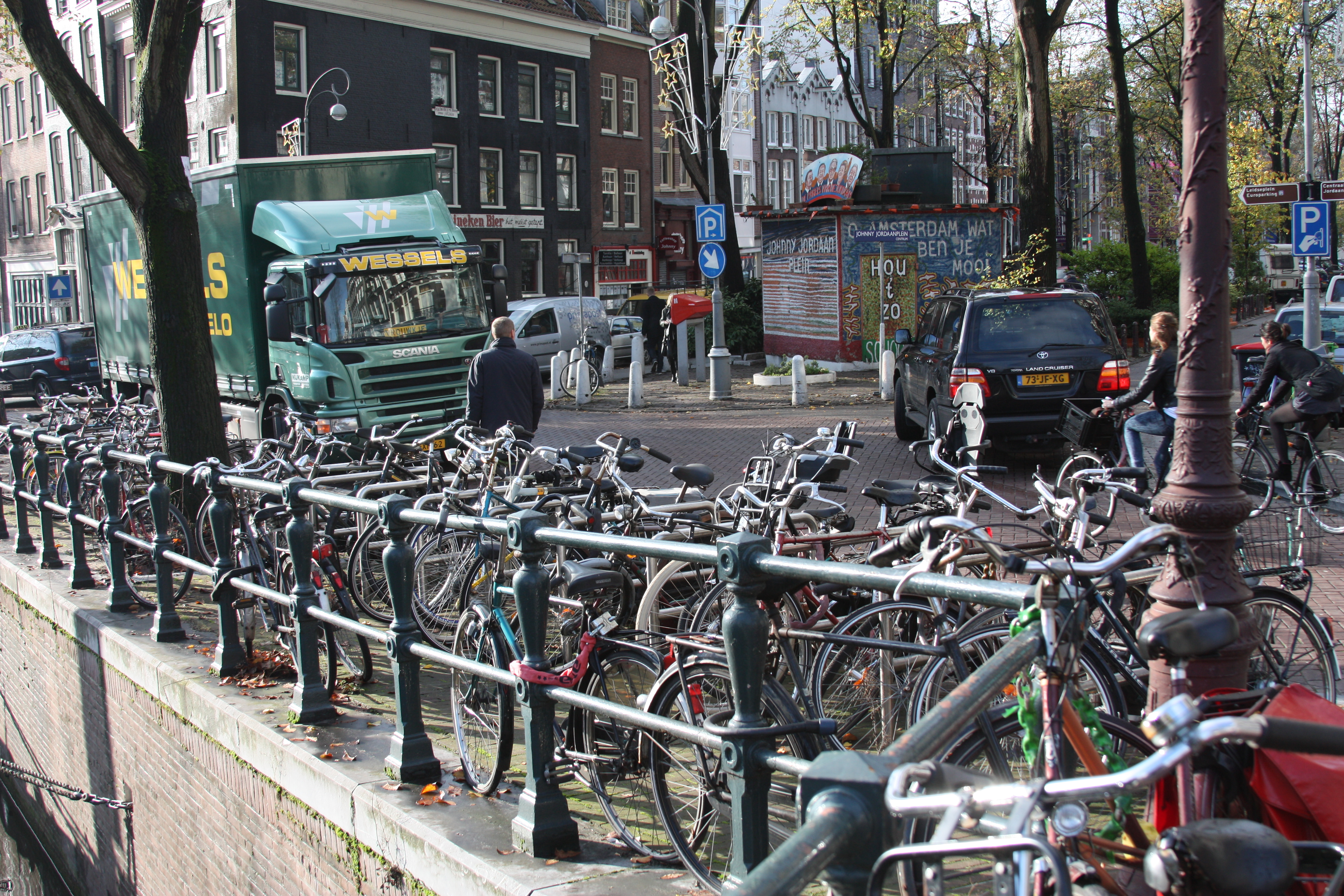
- Elandsgracht

- Former canal (red) in Jordaan
- Location: Amsterdam
- Postal code: 1016
- Coordinates: 52.369489°N 4.880186°E
- East end: Prinsengracht
- To: Singelgracht

The Elandsgracht is a street and former canal in Amsterdam, the Netherlands. It runs between the Prinsengracht and the Singelgracht in the Jordaan neighborhood of the Amsterdam-Centrum district. Bridge 169 over the Singelgracht and Bridge 107 over the Lijnbaansgracht connect the Elandsgracht in the direction of the Kinkerstraat. The Elandsgracht is in the west of the Grachtengordel (canal belt). The Elandsstraat runs parallel to the Elandsgracht. There are houses, shops, cafés and restaurants on the former canal, with parking spaces in the middle.

Notable buildings:

- The Police Headquarters is located at Elandsgracht 117 / corner of Marnixstraat 260-262
- Elandsgracht 113 is located on the corner of the Elandsgracht / Lijnbaansgracht and next to the De Looier antique center
- The neighborhood center 't Claverhuis is located on Elandsgracht 70.

A section of Elandsgracht at the corner with the Prinsengracht has been called Johnny Jordaanplein for several years. It holds statues of four famous Jordanian musicians: Johnny Jordaan, Tante Leen, Manke Nelis and Johnny Meijer, and the duo Jan & Mien. There are also plans to place a statue of Willy Alberti.

== History ==
There were eleven canals in the Jordaan: from north to south: Palmgracht, Goudsbloemgracht, Lindengracht, Anjeliersgracht, Egelantiersgracht, Bloemgracht, Rozengracht, Lauriergracht, Elandsgracht, Looiersgracht and Passeerdersgracht. Elandsgracht was filled in 1891. Goudsbloemgracht was filled in after 1857, Anjeliersgracht in 1861, Rozengracht in 1889, Lindengracht and the Palmgracht in 1895. The reasons for filling the canals were the poor water quality and the need to create space for increasing traffic. Since then, various plans have been made to fill other canals, but these have met with resistance from shopkeepers and market traders.

In the late 19th century Justus van Maurik wrote about Jacob Frederik Muller ( 1690–1718 ), who according to the myth would have been the most notorious villain of Amsterdam of all time. He is said to have lived in the Fort van Sjaco on Elandsgracht near numbers 71-77.

Since 1975 the annual Jordaan festival has been held around the Elandsgracht. In recent years this has taken place at the Appeltjesmarkt, which is closed to bus traffic for the event.

In contrast to the first eight canals in the Jordaan, the canal is not named after a flower, plant or tree, but after the many tanneries that used to be located here where hides from, among others, Elk were worked.

== Transport ==
At the Busstation Elandsgracht are stops for tram lines 5, 7, 17 and 19; Connexxion regional bus station and a taxi rank.

On the section of the Elandsgracht between the Marnixstraat and the Singelgracht the first tram line appeared in 1905, line 7. Line 17 was added in 1915.

In 1974 was a station for the Witkar, invented by Luud Schimmelpennink.

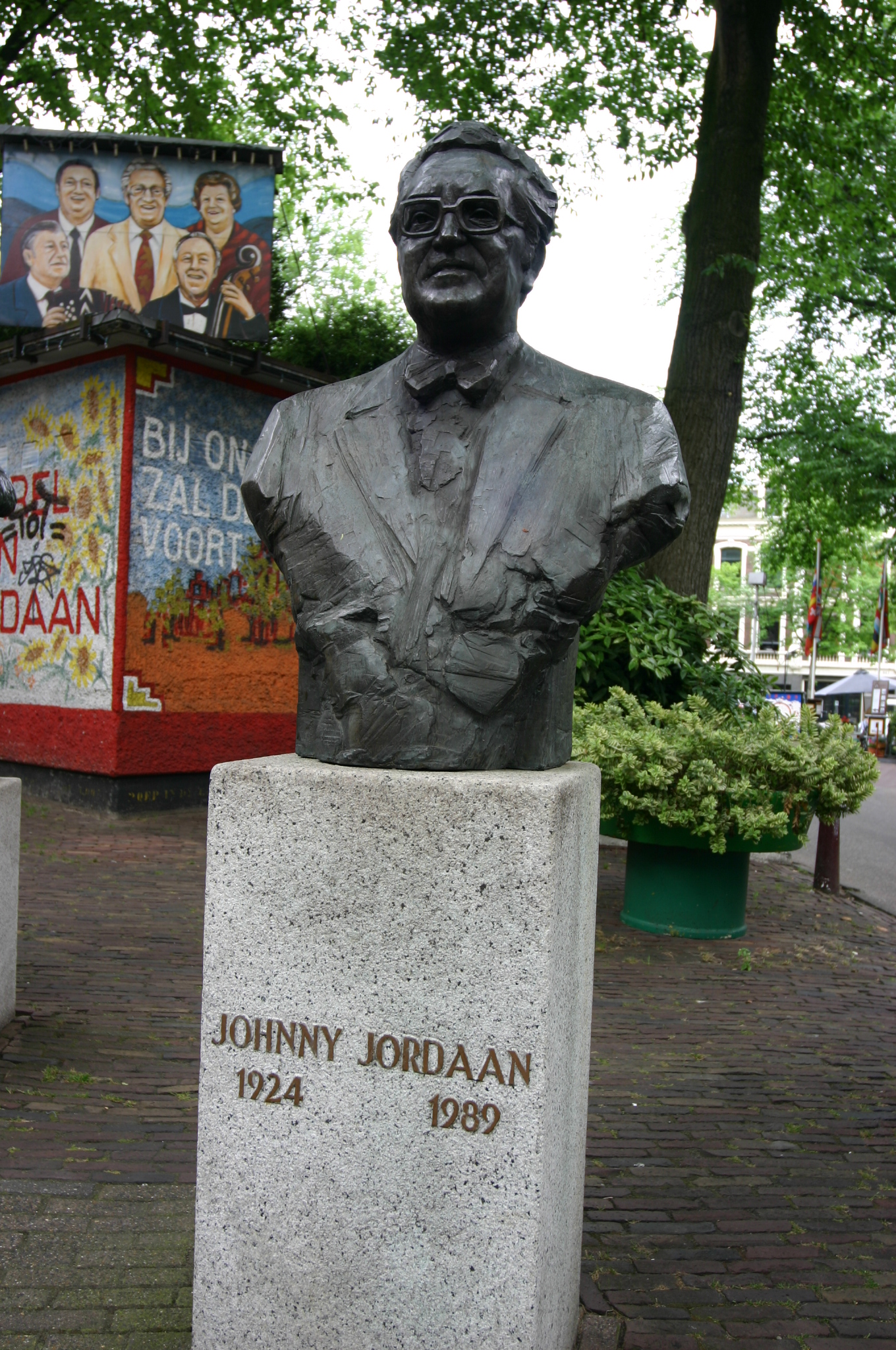
Bust of Johnny Jordaan on Johnny Jordaanplein, Elandsgracht near the Prinsengracht.

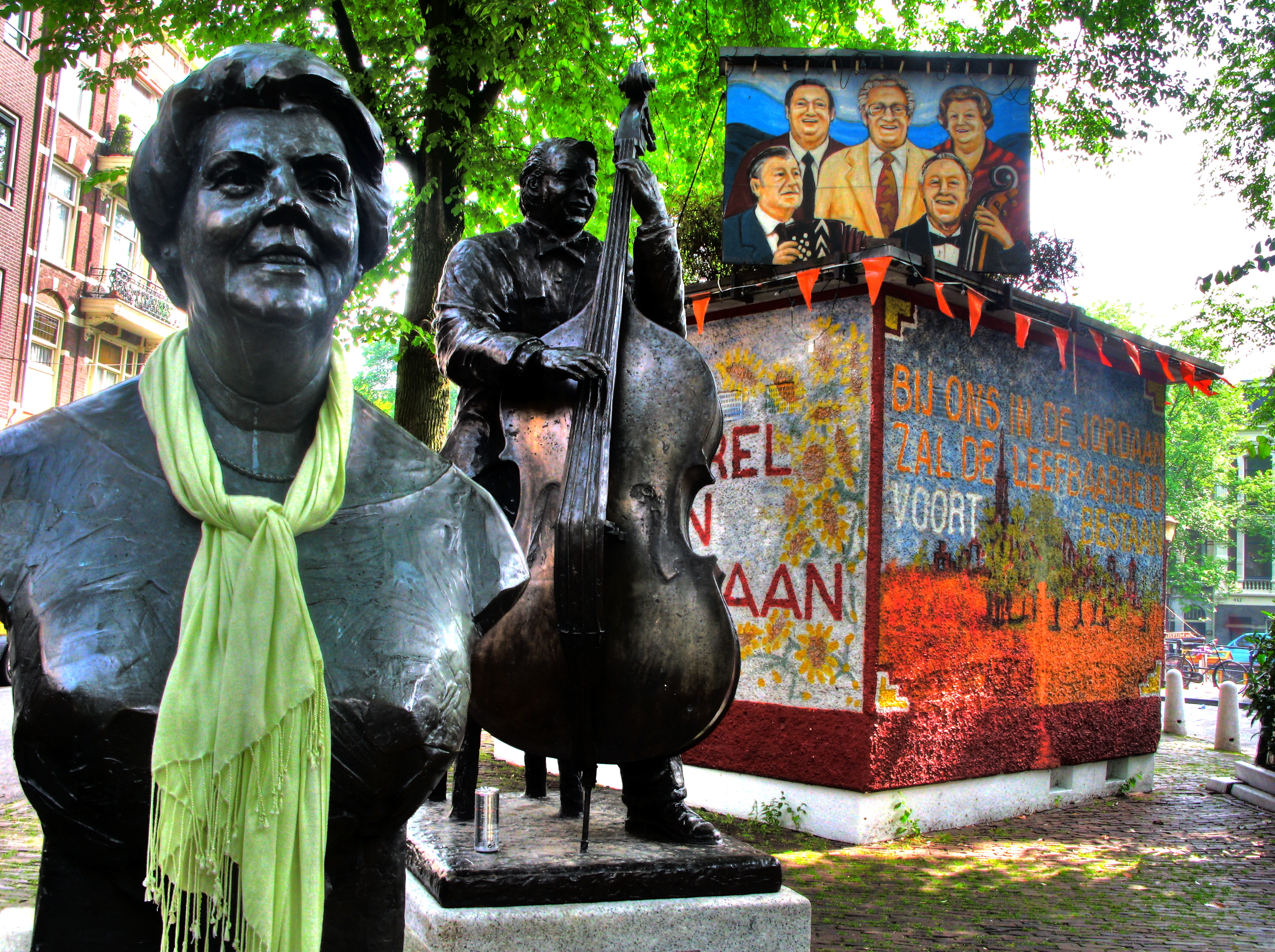
Bust of Tante Leen and Manke Nelis on the Johnny Jordaanplein, Elandsgracht at the Prinsengracht.

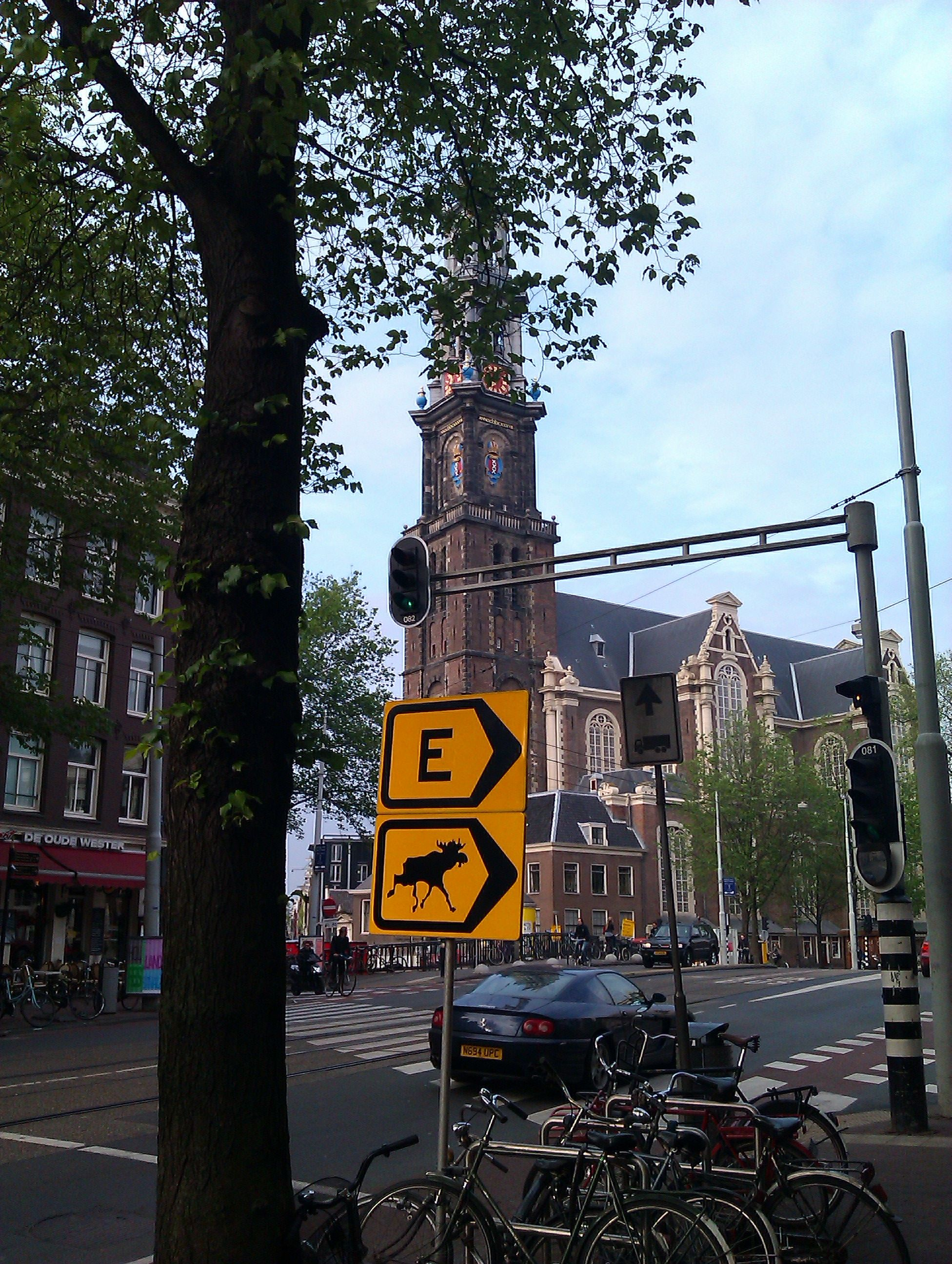
In May 2011, a diversion route was established to reach the Elandsgracht due to work. This is the accompanying board.

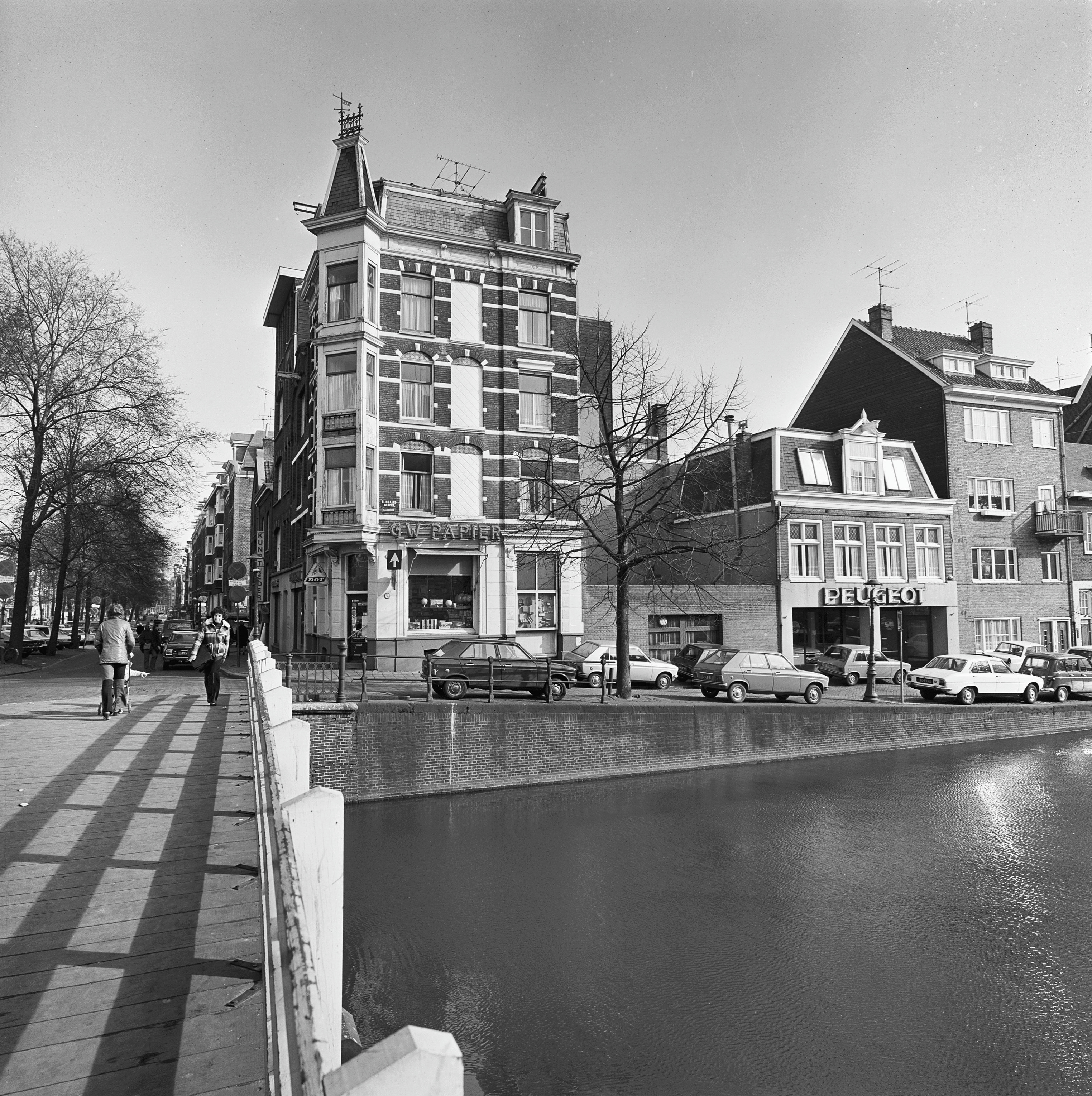
Bridge no. 107, Elandsgracht / Lijnbaansgracht.

== See also ==
- List of streets in Amsterdam

== Sources ==
- Wie wat & waar op de Elandsgrach (in Dutch)
