= Johnny Jordaanplein =

Square in Amsterdam

Johnny Jordan Square
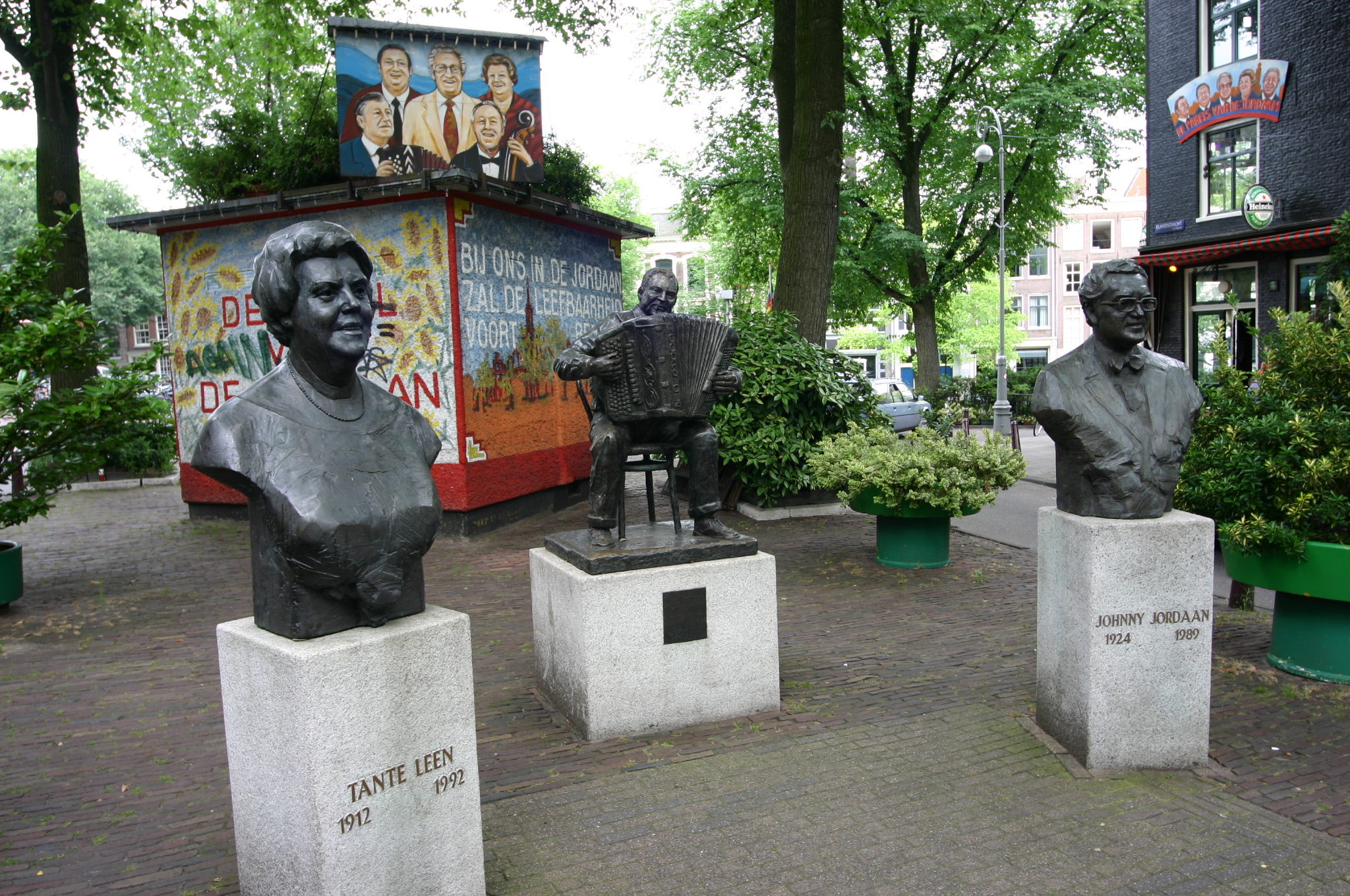
- Johnny Jordaanplein

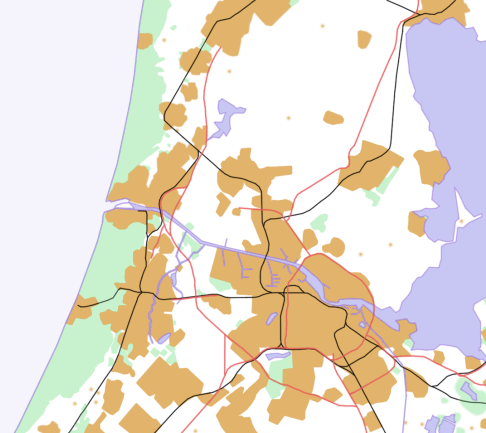
- Location within Northern Randstad Location within Netherlands
- Part of: Elandsgracht
- Namesake: Johnny Jordaan
- Type: Square
- Owner: Amsterdam Municipality
- Location: End of the Elandsgracht Amsterdam NL
- Coordinates: 52.37°N 4.882222°E

Construction
- Completion: 1991

Other
- Known for: Bust (sculpture)s

The Johnny Jordaanplein, also known as Johnny Jordaan Square, is a public square in the center of the Dutch city of Amsterdam which features outdoor sculptures. The square was named after musician Johnny Jordaan and it was dedicated in 1991.

== History ==
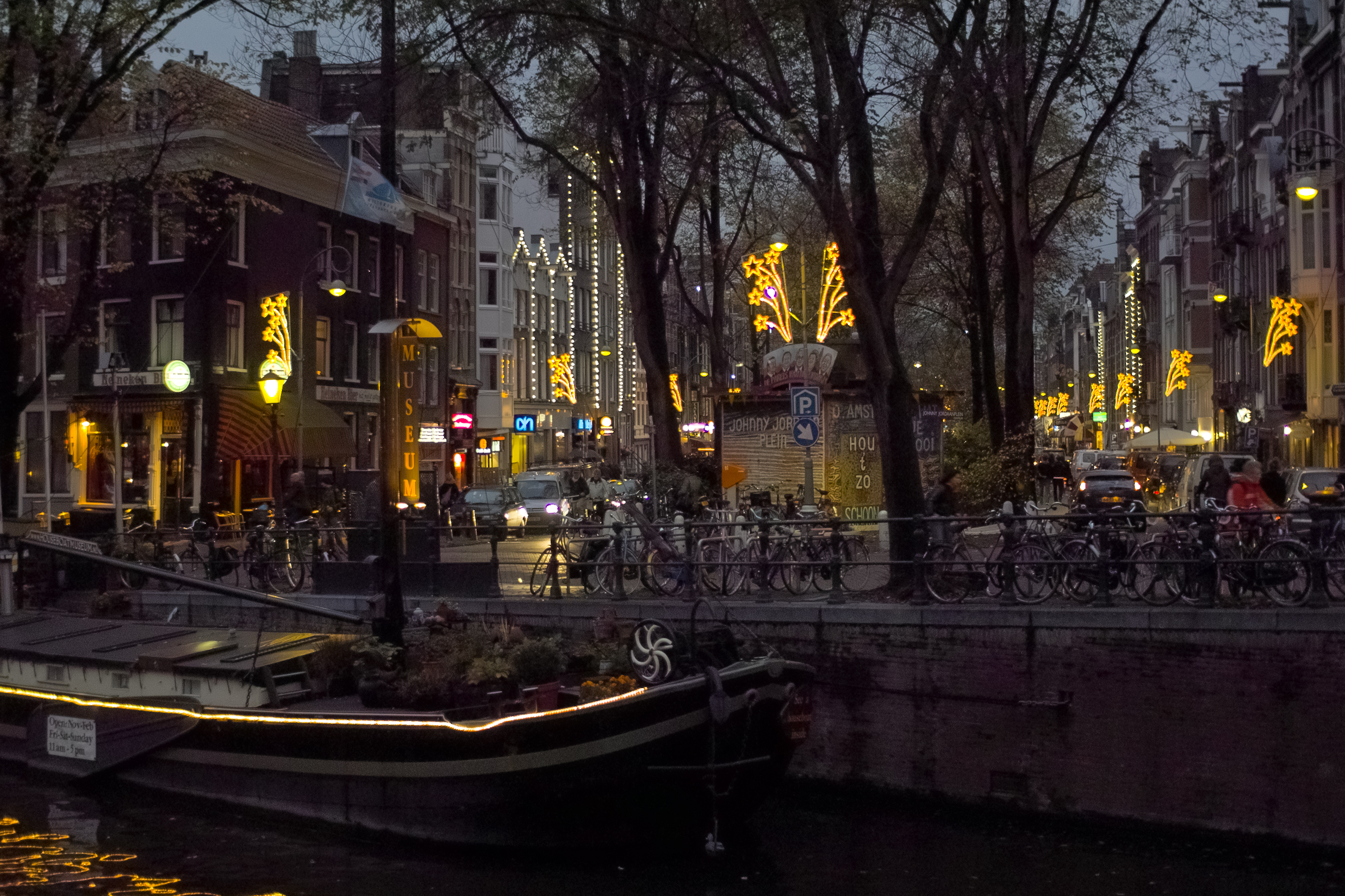
Shops during Christmastime in Amsterdam -Johnny Jordaanplein

The square was named for a popular musician in the mid-1900s: Johnny Jordaan which was the stage name of Johannes Hendricus van Musscher. There is a colorful hut in the small square and bronze sculptures of Jordaan's musical hall of fame. The English name for the square is "Johnny Jordaan Square". Jordaan died in 1989 and shortly after his death there were proposals to dedicate the square. A statue of Johnny Jordaan was unveiled in 1991. There are sculptures of other performers: Tante Leen, Johnny Meijer, Manke Nelis and Jan & Mien in the square.

== Design ==
The square is located on the end of the Elandsgracht next to the De Land Cafe. The exact location is where the Elandsgracht meets the Prinsengracht. The location is a popular meeting place for the residents of Jordaan. Two separate locations competed for the title Johnny Jordaanplein. The singer lived in Staatsliedenbuurt in his final years but the location selected was on the Elandsgracht in the Jordaan neighborhood.

== See also ==
- List of outdoor sculptures in the Netherlands
