= Busstation Elandsgracht =

Bus station in Amsterdam

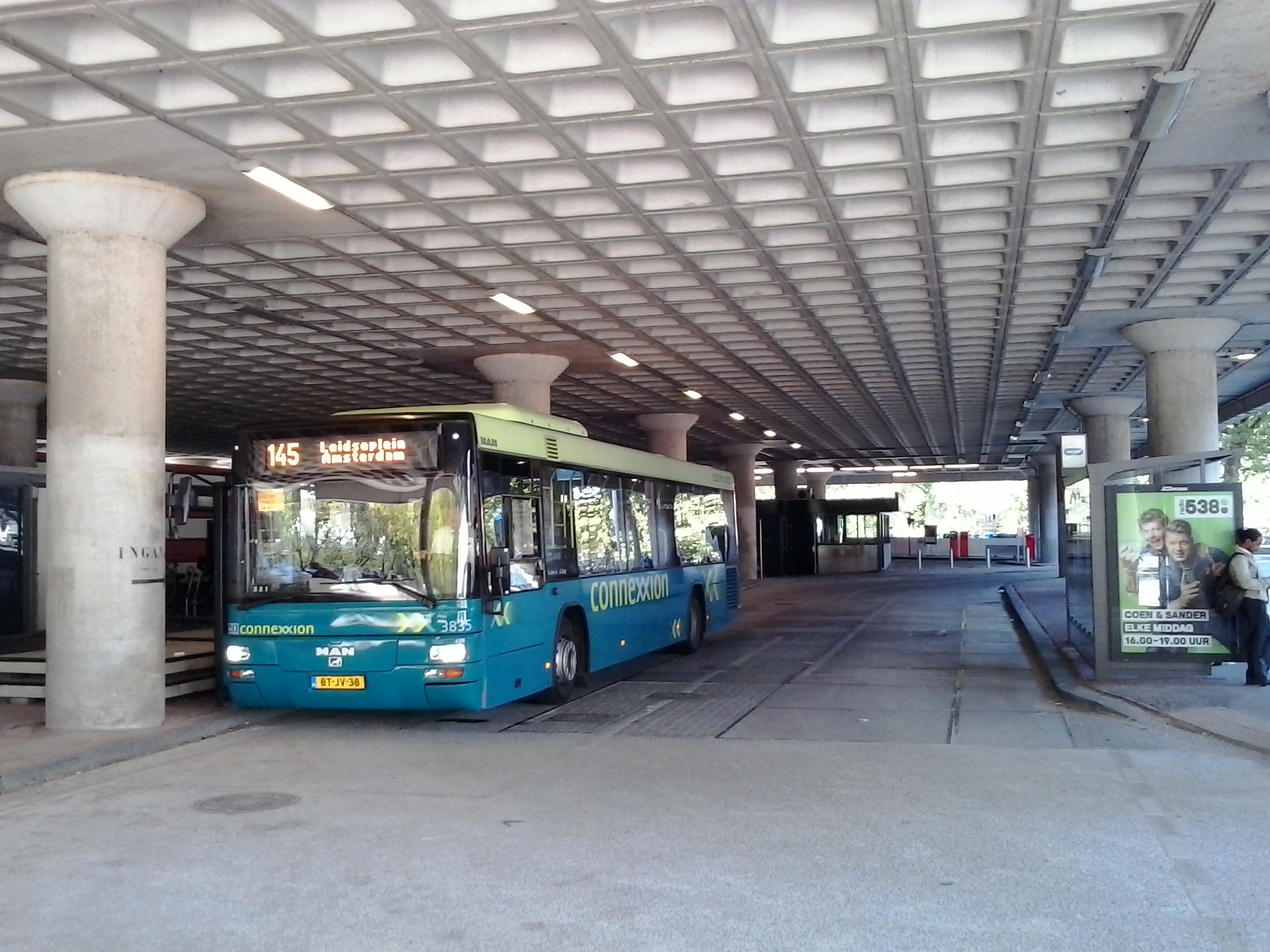
Busstation Elandsgracht in Amsterdam is located under the car parking garage on Marnixstraat

The Elandsgracht bus station is a bus station for regional transport, on the corner of Marnixstraat and Elandsgracht on the western side of the center of Amsterdam. The bus station was known as Marnixstraat bus station until December 2014.

== History ==
The bus station was built in 1957 on the site of the former Appeltjesmarkt, a fruit and vegetable market on the edge of the Jordaan neighborhood. The bus station was known as Marnixstraat bus station.

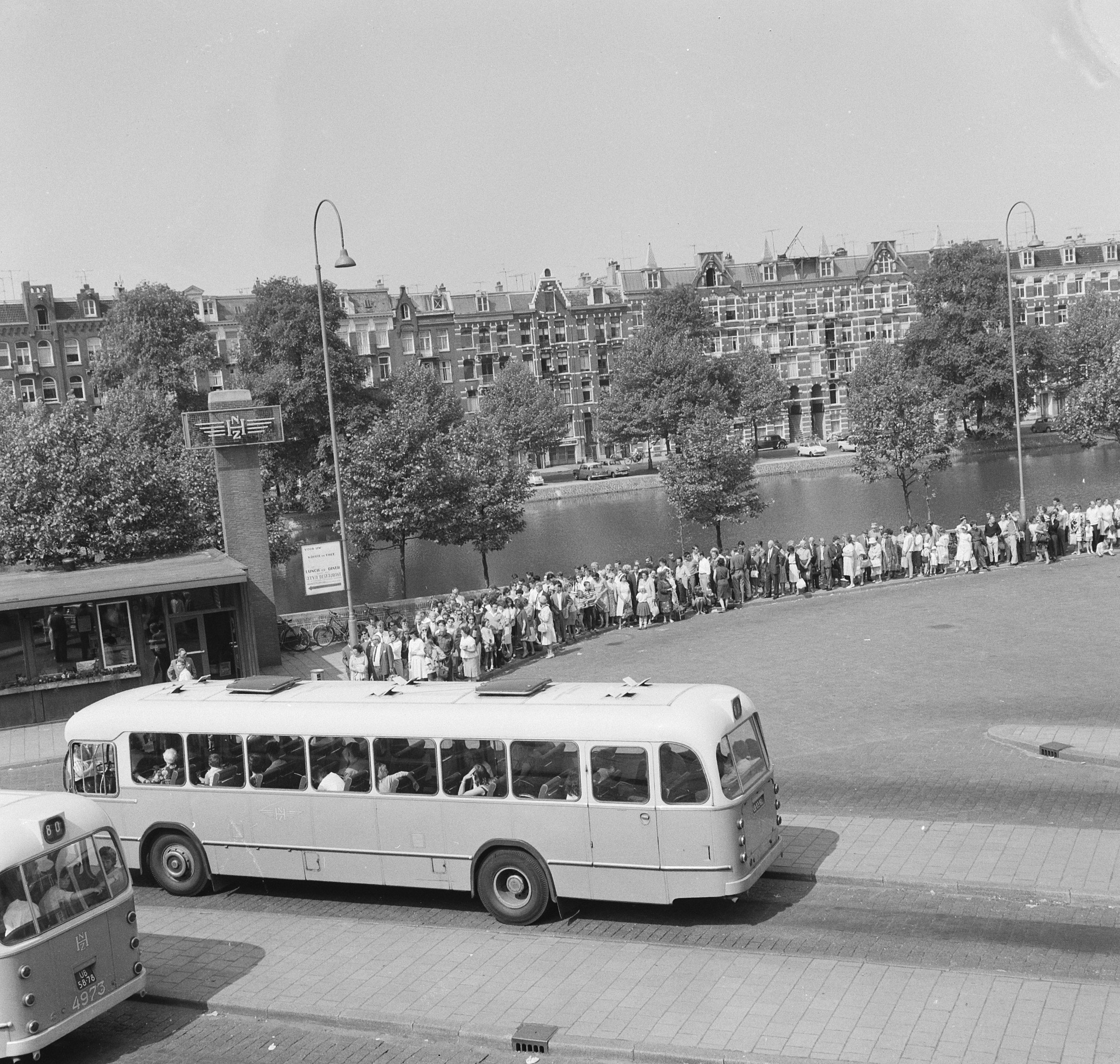
The bus station with the old station building. A line of passengers waits for bus 80 (May 1964)

== Lines ==
The following lines have their terminus at the bus station itself:

Line	Operator	Concession	Kind	Route	Comments
Bus line 80 (Zandvoort-Amsterdam) 80	Connexxion	Haarlem-IJmond	Regional bus	Amsterdam Elandsgracht - Haarlem - Zandvoort	
257	Connexxion	Amstelland-Meerlanden	Rush hour bus	(Amsterdam Elandsgracht →) Haarlemmermeerstation → Amstelveen → Aalsmeer	The route Elandsgracht → Haarlemmermeerstation is only served on Thursdays and Fridays.
347	Connexxion	Amstelland-Meerlanden	R-net	Amsterdam Elandsgracht - Amstelveen - Uithoorn	
357	Connexxion	Amstelland-Meerlanden	R-net	Amsterdam Elandsgracht - Amstelveen - Aalsmeer	
397	Connexxion	Amstelland-Meerlanden	R-net	Amsterdam Elandsgracht - Schiphol - Hoofddorp - Nieuw-Vennep	
Updated on 4 December 2021 om 16:26 (CET)

Outside the bus station are stops for the following tram and bus lines:

Line	Operator	Concession	Kind	Route	Comments
Tramlijn 5 (Amsterdam) 5	GVB	Amsterdam	Tram	Amstelveen Stadshart - Station Zuid - Leidseplein - Westergasfabriek (Van Hallstraat)	
Tramlijn 7 (Amsterdam) 7	GVB	Amsterdam	Tram	Slotermeer - Mercatorplein - Leidsplein - Alexanderplein - Azartplein	
Tramlijn 17 (Amsterdam) 17	GVB	Amsterdam	Tram	Centraal Station - Kinkerstraat - Station Lelylaan - Osdorp Dijkgraafplein	
Tramlijn 19 (Amsterdam) 19	GVB	Amsterdam	Tram	Station Sloterdijk – Bos en Lommer – Leidseplein – Vijzelgracht – Watergraafsmeer – Diemen Sniep	
N47	Connexxion	Amstelland-Meerlanden	Night bus	Amsterdam Centraal – Amstelveen – Bovenkerk – Uithoorn	night version of line 347
N57	Connexxion	Amstelland-Meerlanden	Night bus	Amsterdam Centraal - Amstelveen - Aalsmeer	night version of line 357
N80	Connexxion	Haarlem-IJmond	Night bus	Amsterdam Leidseplein → Haarlem → Beverwijk	
N83	GVB	Amsterdam	Night bus	Centraal Station - Osdorp	
N84	GVB	Amsterdam	Night bus	Centraal Station - Zuid - Amstelveen	
N88	GVB	Amsterdam	Night bus	Centraal Station – West – Nieuw Sloten	
N97	Connexxion	Amstelland-Meerlanden	Night bus	Amsterdam Centraal – Stadionplein – Schiphol – Hoofddorp – Nieuw-Vennep	night version of line 397
Updated on 12 December 2021 om 18:34 (CET)

== See also ==
- Amsterdam Centraal station
- Schiphol Busnet
