= List of songs about Amsterdam =

- "'t Is Stil in Amsterdam" by Ramses Shaffy
- "A Bar In Amsterdam" by Katzenjammer
- "A Windmill in Old Amsterdam" by Ted Dicks and Myles Rudge
- "Aan de Amsterdamse grachten", lyrics by Pieter Goemans in 1949, composed by Dick Schallies. Most famous interpretation was sung by Wim Sonneveld.
- "Aan de voet van die oude Wester"
- "All of the Stars" by Ed Sheeran
- "American in Amsterdam" by Wheatus
- "Amsterdã" by Kevinho and Junior Lord
- "Amesterdão (Have Big Fun)" by Mão Morta
- "Amsterdam" by Buck Owens
- "Amsterdam" by John Cale
- "Amsterdam" by CirKus
- "Amsterdam" by Coldplay
- "Amsterdam" by Dropgun
- "Amsterdam" by Richard Clapton
- "Amsterdam" by Luminary
- "Amsterdam" by Crowded House
- "Amsterdam" by Daughter
- "Amsterdam" by The Dreadnoughts
- "Amsterdam" by Fettes Brot
- "Amsterdam" by FLEMMING
- "Amsterdam" by Grace Davies
- "Blind Man in Amsterdam" by George Ezra
- "Amsterdam" by Gregory Alan Isakov
- "Amsterdam" by Guster
- "Amsterdam" by Imagine Dragons
- "Amsterdam" by Jacques Brel
- "Amsterdam" by Katya Sambuca
- "Amsterdam" by Kevin Coyne
- "Amsterdam" by Liesbeth List
- "Amsterdam" by Alice Phoebe Lou
- "Amsterdam" by Maggie MacNeal
- "Amsterdam" by Mando Diao
- "Amsterdam" by Nephew (Danish band)
- "Amsterdam" by Nothing but Thieves
- "Amsterdam" by NIGHT FLIGHT
- "Amsterdam" by Ørjan Nilsen
- "Amsterdam" by Peter Bjorn and John
- "Amsterdam" by Pool
- "Amsterdam" by Psoy Korolenko
- "Amsterdam" by Riblja Čorba
- "Amsterdam" by Rico Love
- "Amsterdam" by Scott Walker
- "Amsterdam" by Snowpony
- "Amsterdam" by Shane Alexander
- "Amsterdam" by Van Halen
- "Amsterdam" by Wouter Hamel
- "Amsterdam Crown" by Eszter Balint
- "Amsterdam Huilt" by Rika Jansen written by Kees Manders
- "Amsterdam, the first days" by Brainbox
- "Artis" by Spinvis
- "The Ballad of John and Yoko" by The Beatles
- "Big City" by Tol Hansse
- "Bij ons in de Jordaan" by Johnny Jordaan
- "De parel van de Jordaan" by Henk Berlips
- "Brak Obama" by Stepherd & Skinto
- "Centraal Station" by Danique
- "Dans Le Port d'Amsterdam" by Jaques Brel
- "De stad Amsterdam" by Acda en De Munnik
- "De Pijp" by Sophie Straat
- "Dutch TV" by Saint Etienne
- "Een Barkie" by De Jeugd van Tegenwoordig
- "Falcons" by Amanda Bergman
- "Geef mij maar Amsterdam" by Johnny Jordaan
- "Geluk" by Sophie Straat
- "Groen Amsterdam" by Sophie Straat
- "Hallelujah Amsterdam" by Ramses Shaffy
- “Hamsterjam” by Chubby Shaw
- "Heart of Amsterdam" by The Gentle Storm
- "Hee Amsterdam" by Drukwerk
- "Hello Amsterdam" by Doug Sahm
- "Hey Yvonne" by Sophie Straat
- "Houndog" by Cold Chisel
- "Ik verveel me zo (in Amsterdam-Noord)" by Drukwerk, music from Dylan's "A Hard Rain's a-Gonna Fall"
- "In Amsterdam" by Paul Weller
- "Jessie" by Sophie Straat
- "Kalverstraat" by Willy Alberti
- "Kamer in Amsterdam" by De Mens
- "Kinderpsycholoog" by Sophie Straat
- "Little Amsterdam" by Tori Amos
- "Lost in Amsterdam" by Parov Stelar Band
- "Lost Weekend" by Lloyd Cole
- "Maar in Amsterdam" Lenny Kuhr
- "Mary Jane Holland" by Lady Gaga
- "Mijn Stad" by Danny de Munk
- "My Killer My Shadow" by Golden Earring
- "Origineel Amsterdams" by Osdorp Posse
- "Pijpenstelen" by Herman van Veen
- "Port of Amsterdam" by David Bowie, music based on Jacques Brel's Port d'Amsterdam.
- "Streets of Amsterdam" by Richard Ashcroft
- "The Magician" by Dizzy
- "Three Jolly Fishermen" (children's folk song)
- "Too Much Brandy" by The Streets
- "Tulpen uit Amsterdam" by Max Bygraves (original in Dutch by Herman Emmink)
- "Vondelpark" by The 1990s
- "Vondelpark Vannacht" by Acda & De Munnik
- “Meet Me in Amsterdam” by RINI
- “Amsterdam mijn stad (live edition)” by Featuring
