= Manke Nelis =

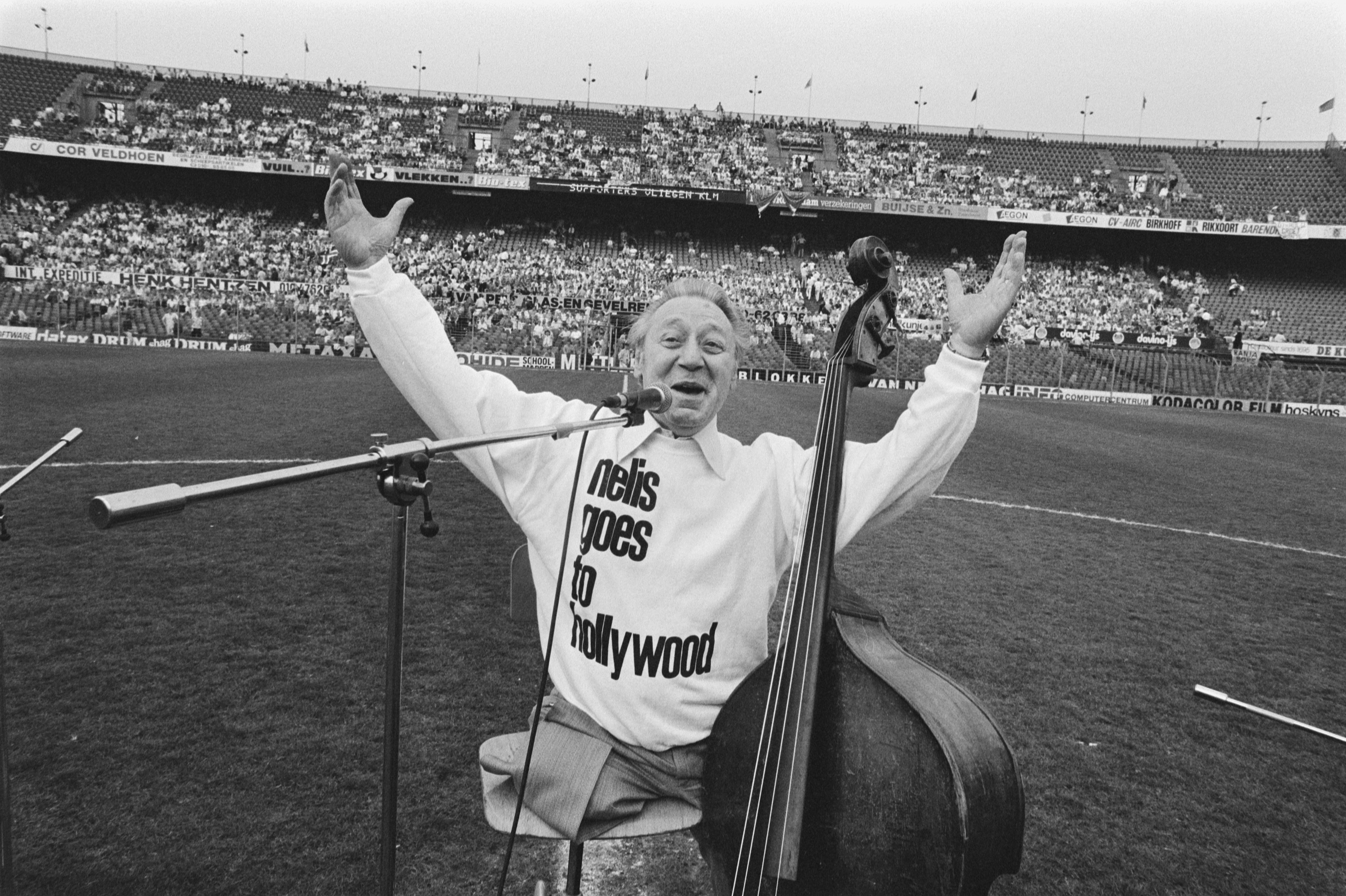
- Manke Nelis in 1987

Background information
- Birth name: Cornelis Pieters
- Also known as: Carlo Pietro
- Born: February 16, 1919; Amsterdam, Netherlands
- Died: October 8, 1993 (aged 74)
- Genres: Levenslied
- Occupation(s): Bass player, singer
- Instrument: Double bass
- Years active: 1957-1987

Manke Nelis (born Cornelis Pieters; 1919-1993) was a Dutch singer in the levenslied genre.

== Career ==
Manke Nelis was born in Groenlo on 16 December 1919 and began his musical career as a bass player, often accompanying his brother-in-law, accordionist Johnny Meijer. In the 1950s he performed under the stage name Carlo Pietro and started singing the Amsterdam levenslied. A motorcycle accident in France and a subsequent medical error cost him a leg; he reportedly spent the more than 100,000 guilders he received as compensation within a year. His biggest hit was "Kleine Jodeljongen" in 1987.

In 1987 he narrowly survived a bus crash on an American tour with Dutch artists, near San Diego. He died of cancer 8 October 1993, at age 73.

== Legacy ==
A statue of Manke Nelis was placed on the Johnny Jordaan Square off the Elandsgracht, in the company of statues for Johnny Jordaan, Tante Leen, and Johnny Meijer.
