= Sophie Straat =

Dutch singer (born 1994)

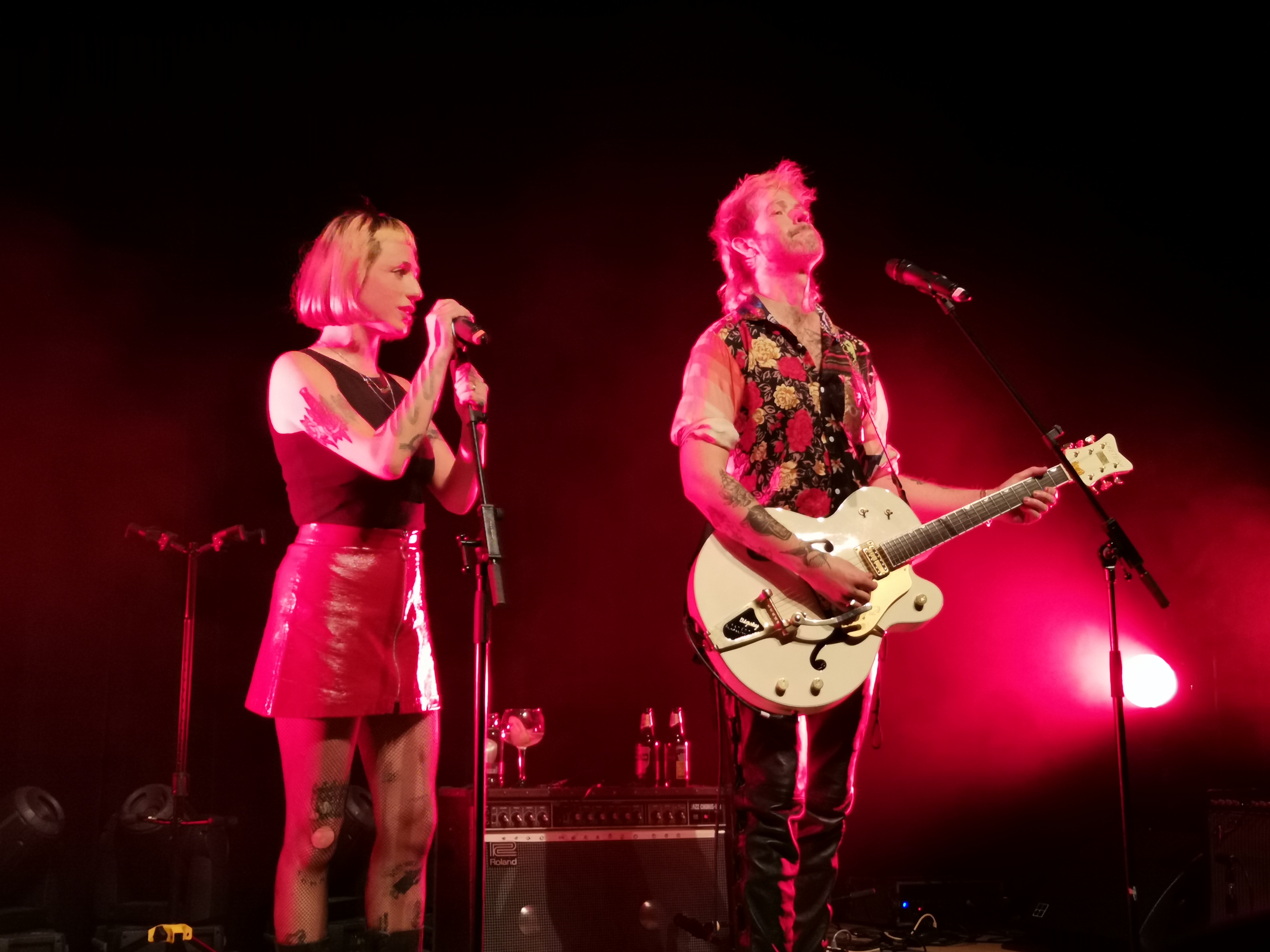
- Straat and Wieger Hoogendorp in 2022

Background information
- Born: Sophie Schwartz; July 28, 1994 (age 32); Amsterdam
- Genres: Levenslied; Protest music
- Occupation: Singer

Sophie Schwartz (born July 28, 1994), known professionally as Sophie Straat, is a Dutch singer who is known for her levenslied and politically left-wing protest songs. Her stage name refers back to her childhood, during which she would often play on the street.

== Early life ==
Sophie Schwartz was born on July 28, 1994, the daughter of an American father and a British mother, and grew up in the De Pijp neighborhood of Amsterdam. She grew up in a Jewish family and went to a Jewish school every Sunday. Schwartz studied at the Koninklijke Academie van Beeldende Kunsten in The Hague.

== Career ==
For her graduation project at the Koninklijke Academie van Beeldende Kunsten, which focused on the cargo bike as a symbol of the gentrification of Amsterdam, she recorded the old-fashioned "smartlap" Groen Amsterdam. Danny de Munk contributed as a guest vocalist to the song.

Together with producer and musician Wieger Hoogendorp, she subsequently recorded the EP 't Is niet mijn schuld. With this release, Straat won an Edison Award in the Dutch-language category in March 2021. The jury praised the record for the way it highlighted current social issues. The songs cover topics including the Dutch housing crisis, racism, and sexism.

Together with the Hague-based band Goldband, she created the song "Tweede Kamer" in 2021 for the 2021 Dutch general election, which called for voting for a woman. In collaboration with Budweiser, she also wrote the song "Voor Ajax" that year, on the occasion of the football club AFC Ajax's 35th national championship. In 2022, Straat produced the documentary Mijn club: een ode aan voetbal for VPRO Dorst together with Hilde Barwegen. The documentary deals with homophobia, racism, and sexism in football and was based in part on the filmmakers' own experiences in the sport.

In 2023, Straat was nominated for an Edison Pop award in the Dutch-language category with her singles from 2022. Additionally, she was nominated for the 3FM Awards in the Best Indie Act category.

That year, the album Smartlap is niet dood was released, combineint levenslied songs with protest music, citing the Zangeres Zonder Naam as an example. The album includes "Wat is het kut om agent te zijn", which sampled Fleetwood Mac's "Everywhere". The song "Nooit genoeg" deals with alcoholism and drug addiction.

In February 2024, Straat was nominated for a 3FM Award in the category Best Collaboration for the song "Energie", which she released together with Chibi Ichigo.

In November 2025, the song "Vrijheid, gelijkheid, zusterschap", released in 2022, rose in the Dutch streaming charts. The activist group Dolle Mina had called for the song to be streamed as a protest against the AI-generated anti-asylum seeker center song "Wij zeggen nee, nee, nee, tegen een AZC".

In June 2026, a controversy arose over a performance by Straat at the Best Kept Secret in Hilvarenbeek. Towards the end of the performance, she asked women, queer people, and people of color to come forward and requested white men to move to the back of the mosh pit. She repeated this request in July 2026 during her performance at the Boomtown festival, part of the Gentse Feesten. With these comments, she called upon the audience to create a punk-style FLINTA* mosh pit (Frauen, Lesben, Intergeschlechtliche, Nichtbinäre, Trans, Agender; German for 'Women, Lesbian, Intersex, Non-binary, Transgender, and Agender people').

Following Straat's comments, several legal complaints were filed and the Belgian anti-discrimination organisation Unia was asked whether the statements violated Belgian anti-discrimination law. Unia responded that it viewed the statement as a form of symbolic and artistic expression, and not as discrimination. The Dutch discrimination hotline Discriminatie.nl, which received "many hundreds of complaints", also found that there was no discrimination in the performances. In response to her request, Straat received a "wave of sexist, anti-Semitic hate messages and (death) threats."

== Discography ==
=== Albums ===
Year	Title	Peak positions	Certification
Year	Title	NED	Certification
2023	Smartlap is niet dood	11	
2025	Wie de fak is Sophie Straat	61	

=== EPs ===
Year	Title	Peak positions
Year	Title	NED
2020	't Is niet mijn schuld	-

=== Singles ===
Year	Title	Peak positions	Certification
Year	Title	NED	Certification
2020	"Groen Amsterdam" (with Danny de Munk)	-	
2020	"Geluk"	-	
2021	"Tweede Kamer" (with Goldband)	-	
2021	"Voor Ajax"	-	
2021	"Nooit genoeg"	-	
2021	"Wat is het kut om agent te zijn"	-	
2022	"Vrijheid, gelijkheid, zusterschap"	8	
2022	"Mijn club"	-	
2022	"Tweede Kamer (The Outsiders Remix)" (with Goldband and Outsiders)	-	
2022	"Mannen"	-	
2023	"Mooier als je lacht"	-	
2023	"Geluk" (with Chibi Ichigo)	-	
2024	"Gebroken Spiegels" (with Metropole Orkest)	-	
2024	"Energie - Parrish Smith Remix" (with Chibi Ichigo and Parrish Smith)	-	
2024	"Het outro"	-	
2025	"Vlinder"	-	
2025	"Mannenbaby"	-	
2025	"Hoe kan het" (with Meetsysteem)	-	
2025	"Dansen met de dood"	-	
2025	"Liefdesliedjes" (with Ploegendienst)	-	
2025	"Let me tell you something 'bout my country"	-	
