= Mokum =

Nickname for Amsterdam

Mokum (מקום) is the Yiddish word for "place" or "safe haven". It is derived from the Hebrew word makom (מקום, "place").

City	Yiddish	Translation
Alkmaar	Mokum Aye	–
Amsterdam	Mokum Alef	City A
Berlin	Mokum Beis	City B
Delft	Mokum Dollet	City D
Rotterdam	Mokum Resh	City R
Winschoten	Mokum van het Noorden	City of the North

In Yiddish, the names for some cities in the Netherlands and Germany were shortened to Mokum and had the first letter of the name of the city, transliterated into the Hebrew alphabet, added to them. Cities named this way were Amsterdam, Berlin, Delft, and Rotterdam.

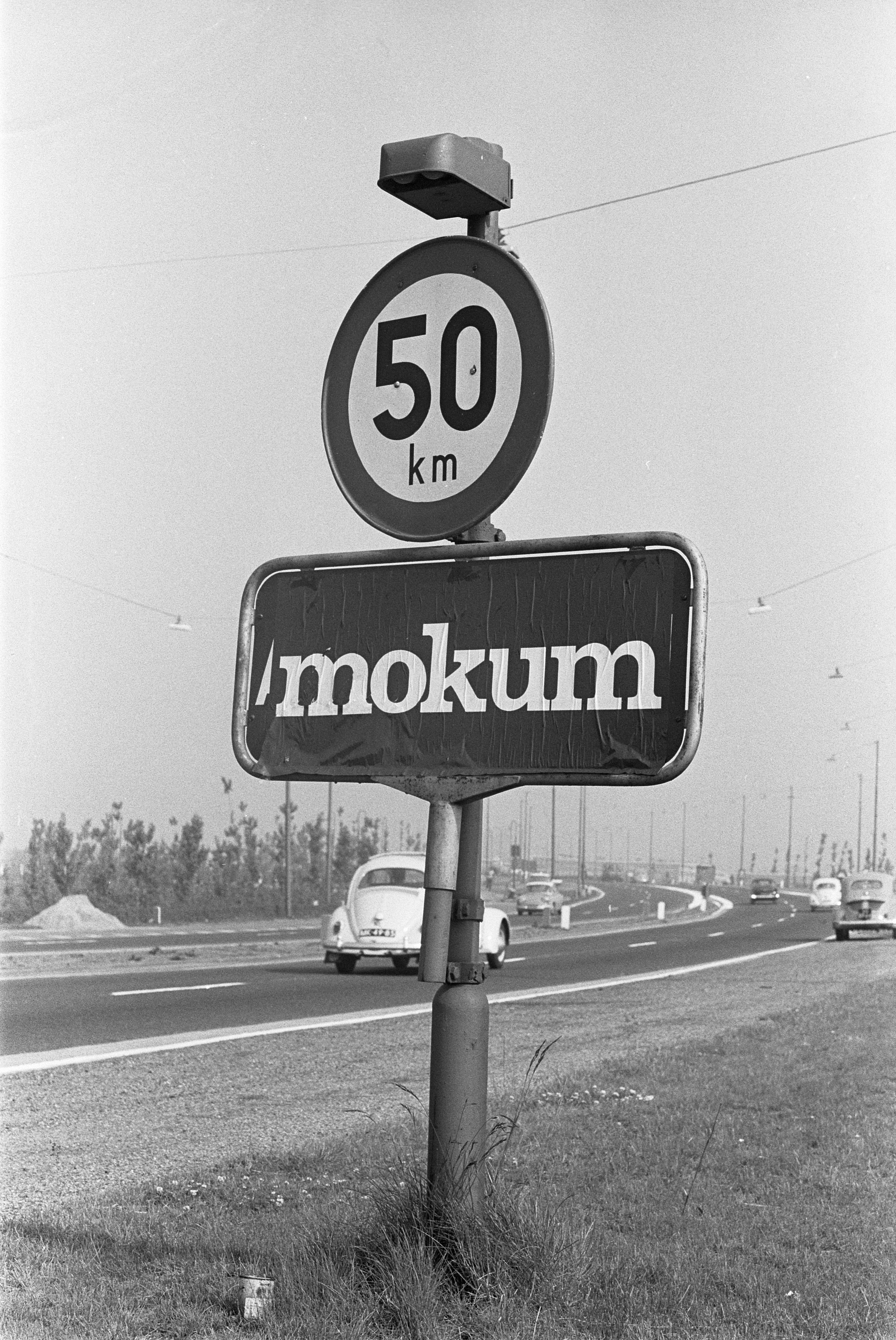
"Mokum" pasted over "Amsterdam" on a city limit sign in 1963

Mokum, without Aleph, is still commonly used as a nickname in the Netherlands for the city of Amsterdam. The nickname was first considered to be an example of bargoens, a form of Dutch slang, but in the 20th century it lost its negative sound and is now used by Amsterdammers as a nickname for their city in a sentimental context.

Examples of its use are the song "Brand in Mokum" (derived from "Scotland's Burning"); Mokum 700, an exhibit in the RAI Amsterdam Convention Centre celebrating the 700th anniversary of Amsterdam in 1975; Mokum in Hi-Fi, an album by Ben van Gelder and Reinier Baas; and "Mama Mokum", a song from 1997 about Amsterdam, by Ramses Shaffy.
