= Geef mij maar Amsterdam =

1955 Dutch song

"Geef mij maar Amsterdam" ("I prefer Amsterdam") is a 1955 song about Amsterdam by Dutch singer Johnny Jordaan. The text is by Pi Veriss, and the music is written by Harry de Groot. A hit song when it was first released, it is one of the songs Amsterdammers identify with most.

== Song and lyrics ==
The song is a waltz in 4/4, with accordion accompaniment. The lyrics proclaim the singer's preference over all cities, especially Paris. The verse narrates how a klaverjas club from Amsterdam took a week-long trip to Paris. The club secretary had studied French for a month but was unintelligible, then ended up singing on the Place Pigalle. The baker suffered from vertigo on the Eiffel Tower and was saved only by the butcher, before everyone went down to the Champs-Elysees where they sang "Geef mij maar Amsterdam". The song ends, "I'd rather be penniless in Mokum than have a million bucks in Paris."

=== Refrain ===
Geef mij maar Amsterdam, dat is mooier dan Parijs
Geef mij maar Amsterdam, mijn Mokums paradijs
Geef mij maar Amsterdam, met zijn Amstel en het IJ
Want in Mokum ben ik rijk en gelukkig tegelijk
Geef mij maar Amsterdam!

(I prefer Amsterdam, it's nicer than Paris; I prefer Amsterdam, my Mokum paradise. I prefer Amsterdam, with the Amstel and the IJ; Because in Mokum I'm rich and happy, I prefer Amsterdam.)
