= Pi Vèriss =

Pi Vèriss, born Piet Visser, was a Dutch songwriter and composer probably best known for writing the Johnny Jordaan hit "Geef mij maar Amsterdam", an immensely popular Jordaanlied. He was awarded the Golden Harp in 1986 for his entire body of work.

Vèriss was the regular songwriter for Johnny Jordaan in the 1950s (apparently he wrote "Geef mij maar Amsterdam" in ten minutes), and wrote and produced a number of other Dutch hit songs, some of which he recorded in the home studio in his attic. In the early 1970s, he owned a building in Baambrugge, in which the Beach Boys recorded Holland (all other studio space in the Netherlands being booked). The studio inside that building was heavily modified from the four-track home studio Vèriss had built in a former chicken coop; the Beach Boys flew the studio equipment in from the United States.
