= Schipholnet =

Bus network in the Amsterdam area

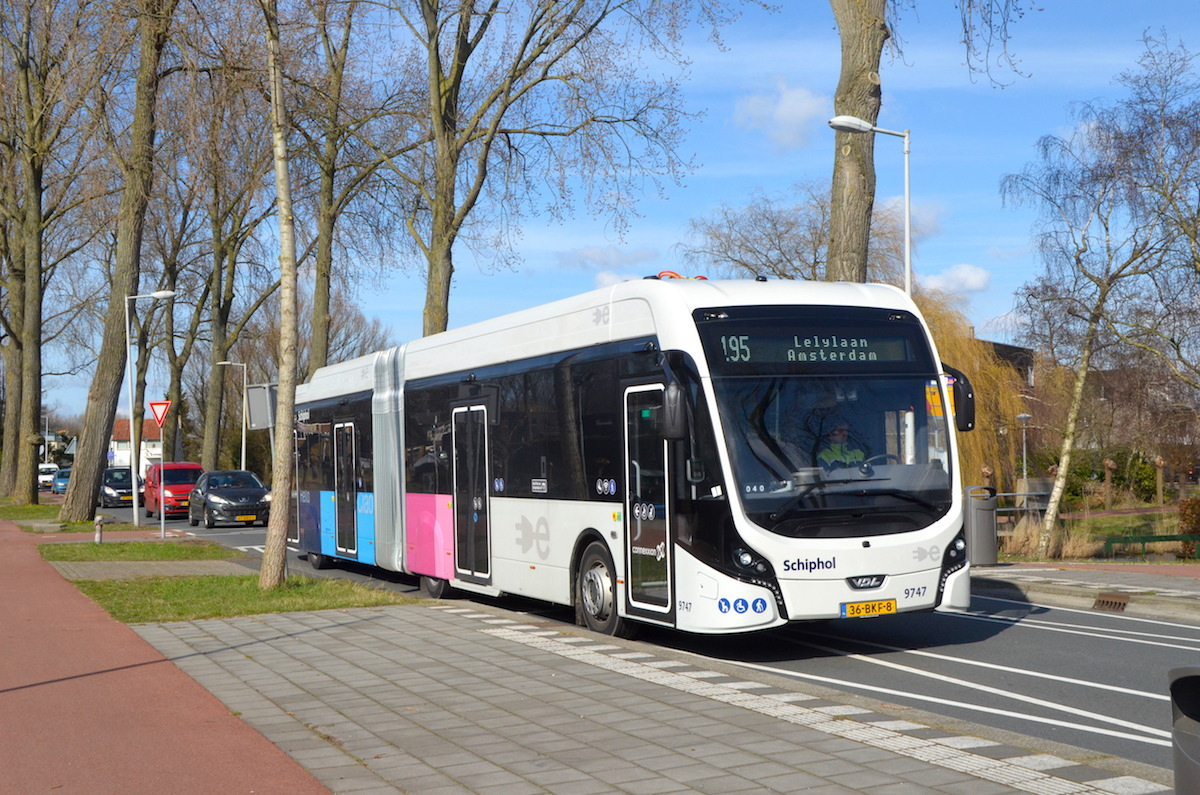
Schipholnet bus for route 195

Schipholnet SKIP-(h)oll-net /ˈskɪp(h)ɒlˌnɛt/; Dutch: [ˈsxɪp(ɦ)ɔlˌnɛt, sxɪpˈɦɔlˌnɛt] is the public bus transport service operated by Connexxion between Schiphol Airport and nearby municipalities including Aalsmeer, Amstelveen, Amsterdam and Badhoevedorp. From its creation in 2000 until December 2017 the service was named Schiphol Sternet.

== General information ==
Schiphol Sternet launched in 2000 as a joint-venture between Connexxion and GVB. As of 11 December 2011, the routes operated by GVB were handed over to Connexxion, who now operates all Schipholnet lines. It forms a merger of the private bus services for Schiphol employees and a few routes of the regional public transport from Schiphol to surrounding municipalities. For example, route 192 is the former route 68, route 195 is the former route 164 and route 199 is the former route 169. The buses run seven days a week until 01:00 at night, and start in the early morning. A few bus lines run throughout the night.

Until 2018 a short stretch through Schiphol-East was a "secured zone" and banned for people without a Schiphol Pass.

As with all public transport in the Netherlands, fares can be paid with OV-Chipkaart or other contactless payment. Employees of certain companies can receive a Schiphol Flex membership to cover the fares.

Unlike in most buses in the Netherlands, where boarding at the driver's door is obligatory, entering the bus within Schiphol is allowed at every door of the bus.

Schiphol has a well-extended network of bus lanes. Additionally, buses are permitted to use shoulder lanes on motorways.

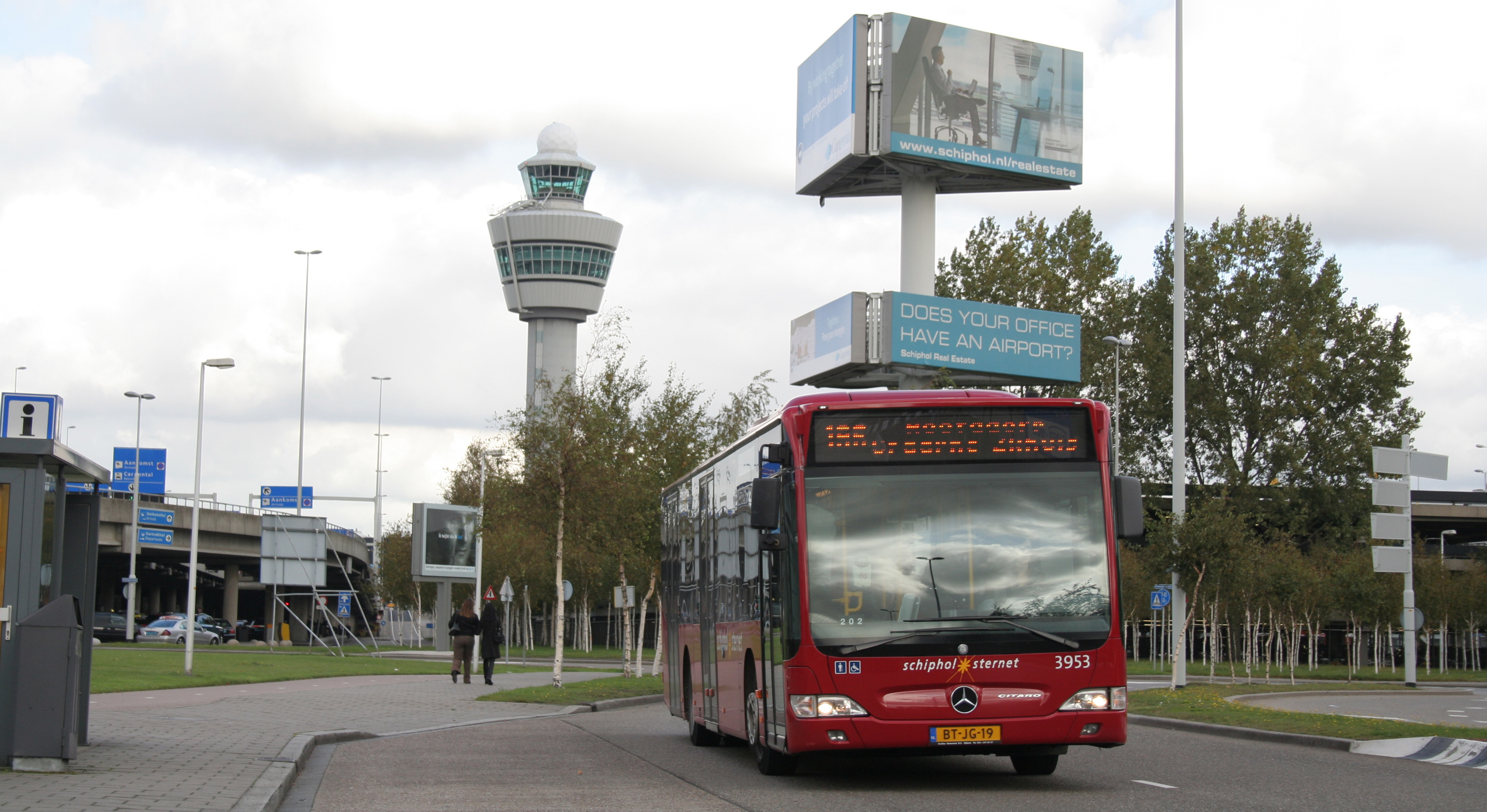
Bus with Schiphol Sternet livery in October 2008

In December 2017, the name "Schipholnet" replaced "Schiphol Sternet". By March 2018, the bus fleet had been replaced with VDL Citea electric articulated buses.

== Material ==
The Connexxion buses, and until 2011 also the GVB buses, are all painted in dark red, with a yellow Sternet logo. Connexxion uses Mercedes-Benz Citaro low floor buses with Euro 5 diesel engines. The buses are fully low-floor and have three wide doors. A special wheelchair entrance is at the middle door. Connexxion's own board computer Infoxx is installed in the bus, which automatically announces the next stop, shows traveling information on a screen, calculates the price for passengers paying using an OV-Chipcard and should enable the driver to see whether or not he is late or early.

A screen is installed at bus stops, showing the arrival of the next buses.

After December 2017, all buses have been replaced by white VDL Citea electric articulated buses. The name "Busnet" is not visible on the bus, only the Connexxion logo and "Schiphol" is visible.

== Network ==
Line	Route	Remark(s)
181	Schiphol P30 - Rozenburg - Schiphol-South-East - Schiphol-Rijk	
185	Schiphol North-West - Centre	Shuttle
186	Schiphol P30 – Plaza/NS – P40 - KLM-headquarters - Amstelveen Bus station	
187	Schiphol P40 – Plaza/NS – P30 - Schiphol-Rijk – Schiphol-East - KLM-headquarters - Amstelveen Bus station - Kronenburg	Route 287 (peak hours only) is a direct service between Schiphol Plaza and Schiphol-Rijk
189	Schiphol North-West - North	Shuttle
190	Schiphol P30 – Plaza/NS – P40	As support at times that other buses are not in service Also at night.
191	Schiphol P40 – Plaza/NS – P30 – Rozenburg - Schiphol-South-East Anchorageln.	
192	Amsterdam Osdorp - Badhoevedorp – Schiphol P40 – Plaza/NS – P30	
193	Schiphol P30 – Plaza/NS – P40 - Schiphol-East South-end	
194	Schiphol (South - Centre - North) - Badhoevedorp - Amsterdam Osdorp	Peak hours only
195	Amsterdam Lelylaan NS - Nw. Sloten - Schiphol-North - P40 - Plaza/NS - P30	
197	Schiphol P30 – Plaza/NS – P40 - Schiphol-North - Amsterdam Stadionplein - Haarlemmermeer station - Museumplein - Leidseplein - Marnixstraat	Operated during the night as route N97
N97	Schiphol P30 – Plaza/NS – P40 - Schiphol-North - Amsterdam Stadionplein - Haarlemmermeer station - Museumplein - Leidseplein - Marnixstraat	Operated during the night as route N97
198	Schiphol East – P40 – Plaza/NS – P30 – Schiphol-Rijk Beech avenue - Aalsmeer Hortensiaplein	
199	Amsterdam South NS – Amstelveen – Schiphol East – P40 – Plaza/NS – P30	
