= Scotland's Burning =

Song and nursery rhyme popular with children

Song
- Published: 1580
- Genre: Nursery rhyme

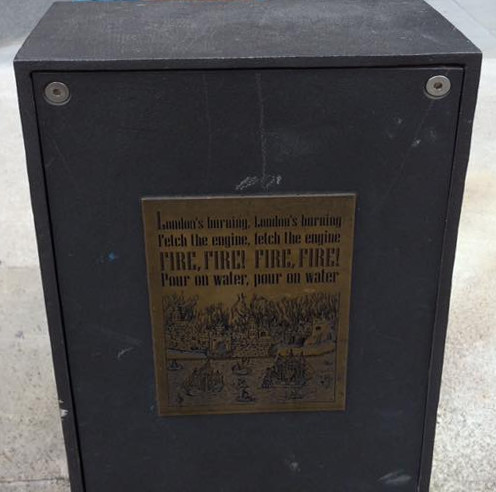
A drinking fountain next to the Monument to the Great Fire of London, showing the song's words

"Scotland's Burning", also known in England as "London's Burning", is a variant of a song and nursery rhyme popular with children.

== Words ==
The song can be sung as a round when each part starts two bars after the previous one. It may be an example of a nursery rhyme with tragic or violent themes. The London lyrics are said to be about the Great Fire of London, a five-day fire in the city of London in 1666. The first notation of a round in this theme dates from 1580. The Scotland lyrics are said to be about the Burning of Edinburgh in 1544, ordered by Henry VIII of England.

The lyrics are alluded to in William Shakespeare's The Taming of the Shrew, Act 4, scene 1, when Grumio asks Curtis to prepare a warm fire for guests.

In the Netherlands the song is known as "Brand in Mokum" ("Fire in Amsterdam"), which is said to refer to the Amsterdam revolt against Napoleon in 1813.

== Musical scores ==
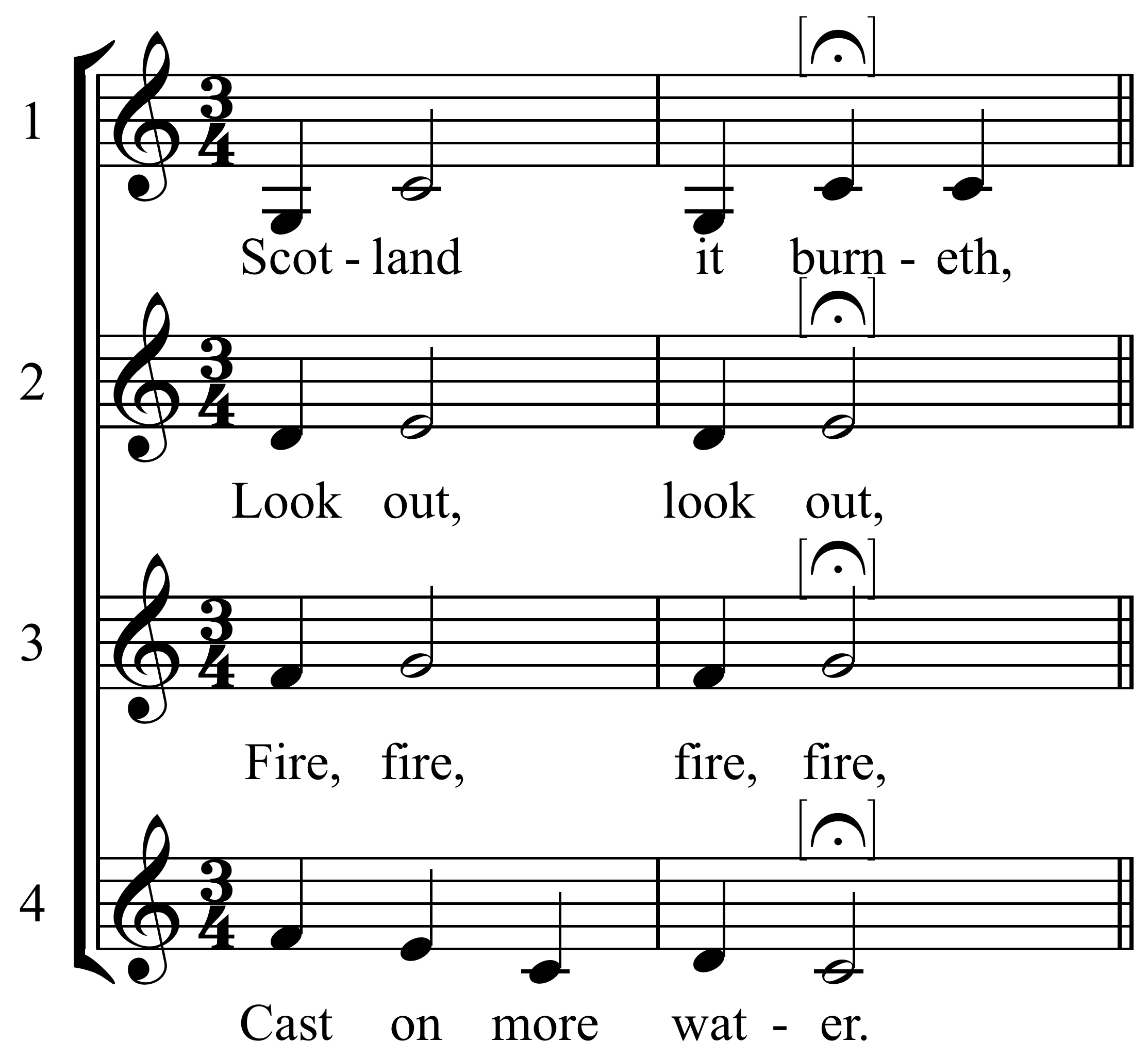
"Scotland's Burning" (1580)

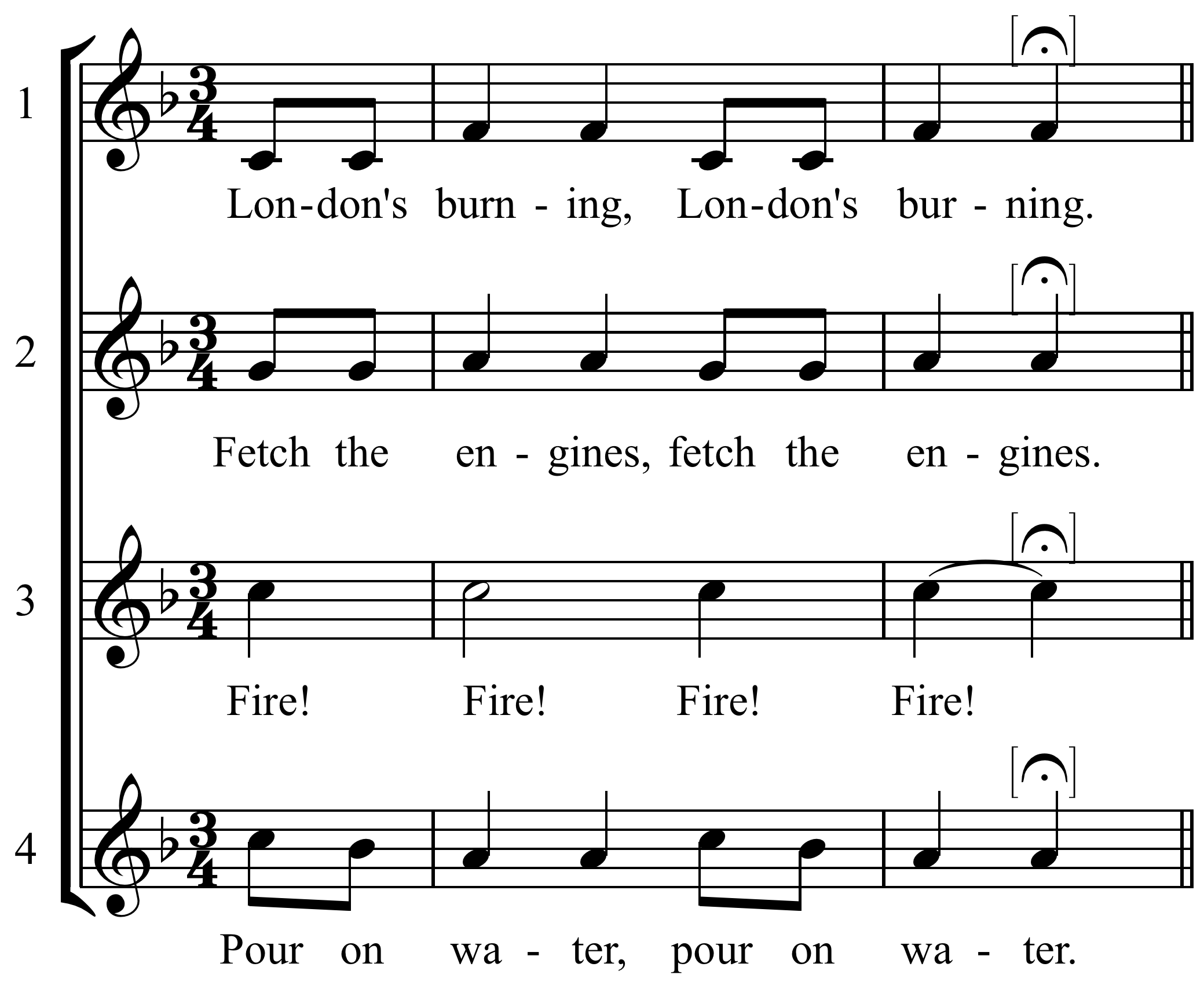
"London's Burning"

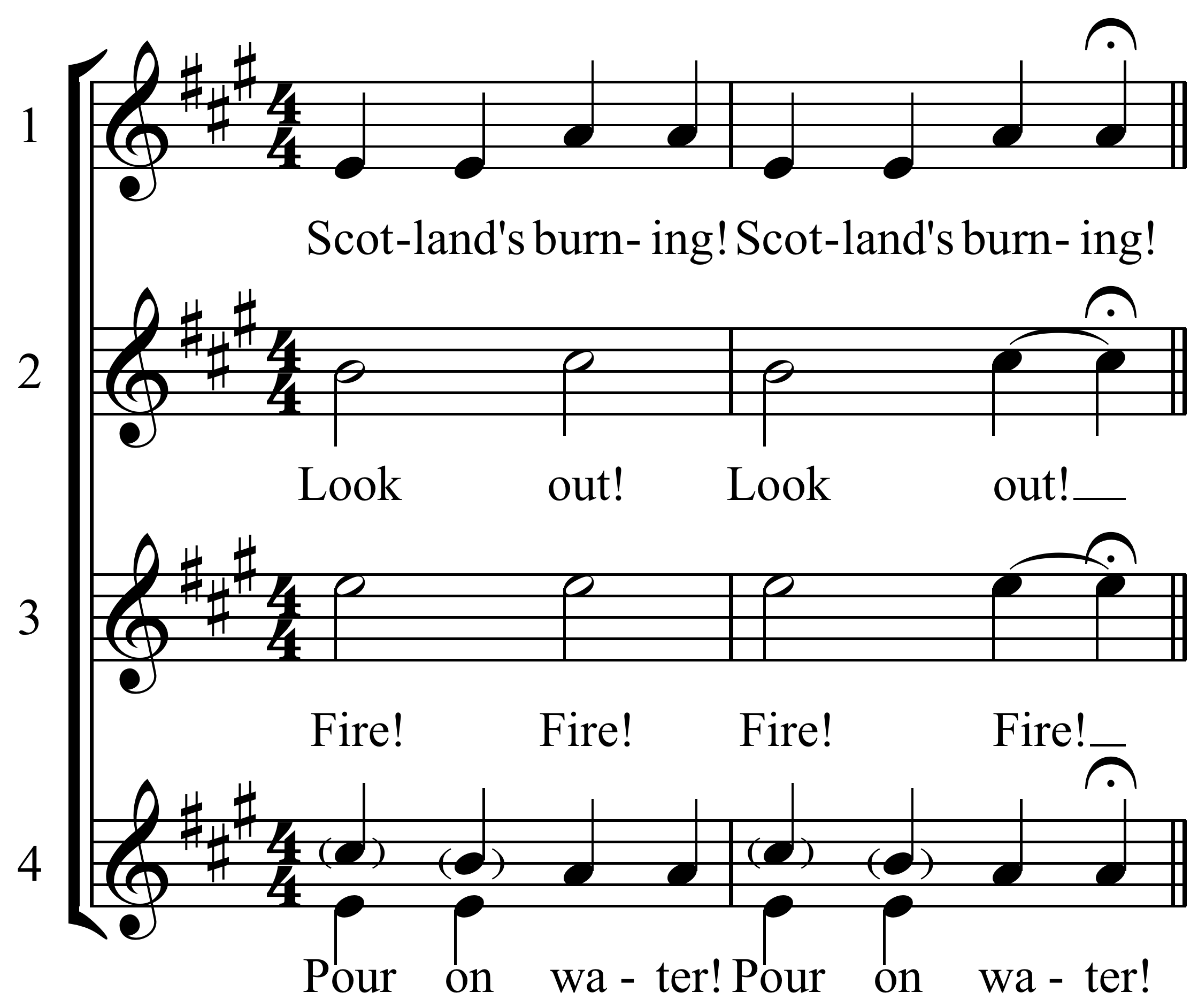
"Scotland's Burning" in duple meter.
