= Chibi Ichigo =

Belgian musician (born 1998)

- Born: Sabina Nurijeva; 1998 (age 27–28); Uzbekistan
- Genres: Hip-hop, electropop, gabberpop
- Occupations: rapper, musician

Sabina Nurijeva, born in 1998 in Uzbekistan, is a Belgian musician whose stage name is Chibi Ichigo. Initially, she mainly performed hip-hop in Dutch and Russian, but later shifted towards electropop.

== Biography ==
=== Youth and personal life ===
Born in Uzbekistan, Nurijeva moved with her mother to Leopoldsburg, Belgium, at the age of two to escape her father. During her childhood, she also lived in Hechtel and Stokrooie. As a teenager, she struggled with mental health issues, which influenced her music, where themes of self-acceptance are predominant. She also lives with a compulsive disorder, particularly the fear of contamination. She is in a relationship with Umi Defoort, who regularly collaborates on her musical projects as a producer. She lives with him in Brussels.

Although Dutch became her first language due to her education in Belgium, she rediscovered her Russian skills, mainly thanks to her mother who helped her. After completing her secondary education, she briefly studied journalism in Ghent but ultimately decided to dedicate herself entirely to music.

=== Career ===
Nurijeva released her first single, Russian Snow, in 2018. In 2019, she followed it up with her first EP, Legenda, and in late 2020, she released "Bloei," her first Dutch-language project. In 2020, Nurijeva participated in the eighteenth season of Slimste Mens ter Wereld, which resulted in an increase in streams.

In 2021, she released the EP Chibumiverse in collaboration with Umi Defoort. Her collaboration with Defoort resulted in a shift in her musical style from hip-hop to electropop, incorporating influences from eurodance, techno, gabber, and big beat. This change was partly influenced by the COVID-19 pandemic, which allowed her to explore a wider range of musical genres with the help of her boyfriend and manager. On October 14, 2022, she released her first album "Sabina," to which Umi Defoort also contributed, with Jeroen De Pessemier being involved in the project as well. Her second album NA HALF 1 was released on January 26, 2024.

== Discography ==
=== Studio albums ===
- 2022: Sabina (33rd place in the Top Notch charts)

=== EPs ===
- 2019: Legenda
- 2020: Bloei
- 2021: CHIBUMIVERSE
- 2024: NA HALF 1
- 2019: Secret
- 2020: Russian Snow
- 2020: Bloei
- 2020: Poka
- 2020: Verkeerde Bocht
- 2020: Sussend
- 2021: Club Russia
- 2023: Energie
- 2024: HALF 1
