= Johnny Jordaan =

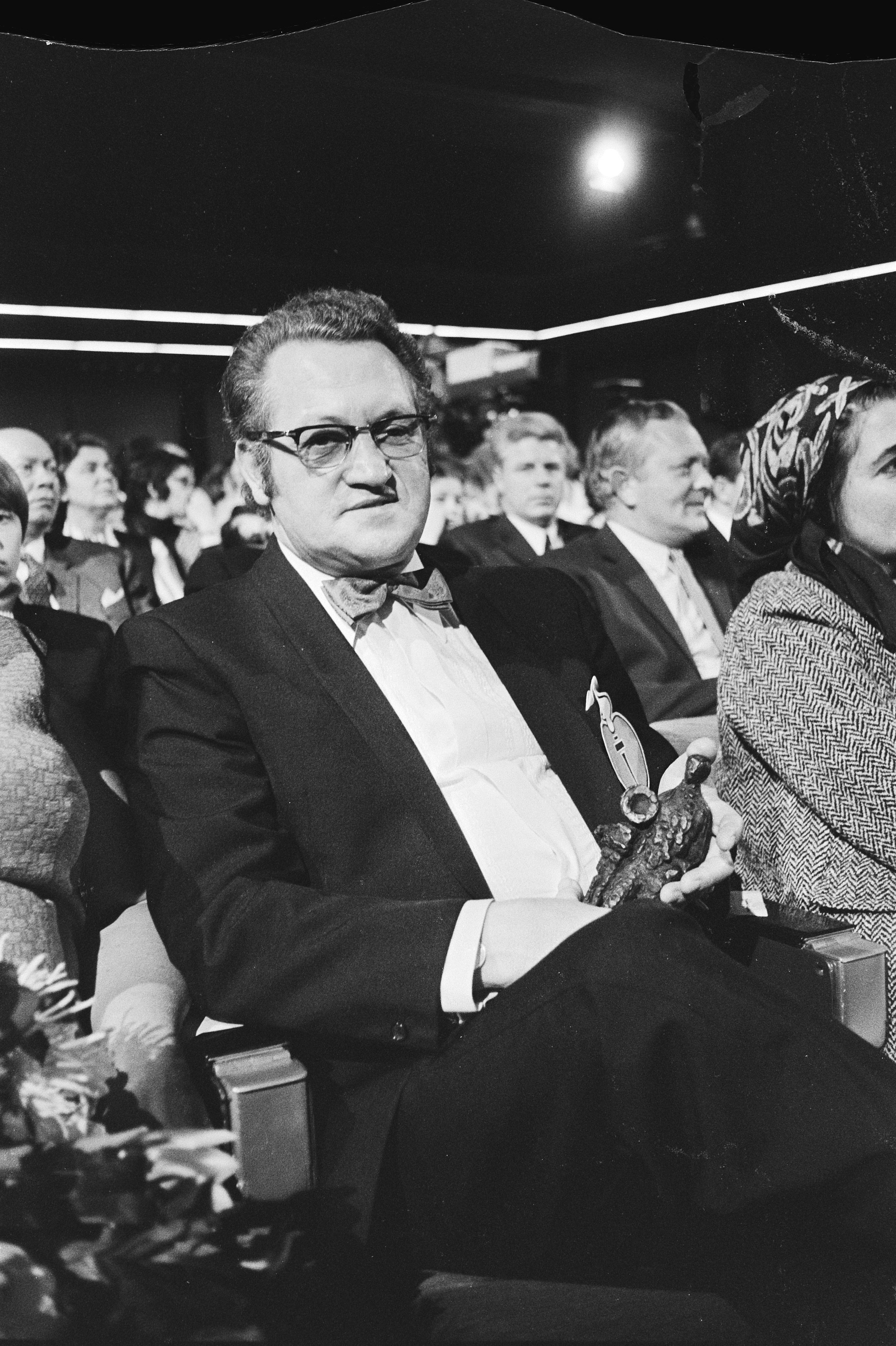
- Johnny Jordaan in 1971

Background information
- Birth name: Johannes Hendricus van Musscher
- Also known as: De Parel van de Jordaan ("The pearl of the Jordaan")
- Born: 7 February 1924
- Origin: Amsterdam, Netherlands
- Died: 8 January 1989 (aged 64)
- Genres: Popular music, levenslied
- Occupation: Singer
- Years active: 1954–1989

Johnny Jordaan was the pseudonym for Johannes Hendricus van Musscher (7 February 1924 – 8 January 1989), a Dutch singer of popular music, in particular the genre known as levenslied, a Dutch variety of the French chanson. He was well known for his songs about the city of Amsterdam, especially the Jordaan district (the genre dedicated to the neighborhood is known as the Jordaanlied), which he sang in a typical "hiccuping Mokum vibrato", "Mokum" being the Hebrew-derived nickname for the Amsterdam inner city area. In the 1950s, Johnny Jordaan rose almost instantly to the level of national celebrity and became the "uncrowned king of the Jordaanlied", and his hit song "Geef mij maar Amsterdam" is one of the songs Amsterdammers identify with most.

== Biography ==
Jordaan was born the son of a roofer, and grew up within sight of the Westertoren, on the corner of the Lijnbaansgracht and the Rozengracht, the edge of the Jordaan—by then an impoverished working-class neighborhood. He was the oldest of two brothers in a Roman Catholic workers' family. He started singing in the streets at age 8, with his cousin Carel Verbrugge (Willy Alberti), to help provide for his family. He lost an eye during a fight with Verbrugge, at age 9. He started using the name "Johnny Jordaan" when he was 14, and after vocational school began working various odd jobs and singing in bars. Despite already having discovered his homosexuality, he married in 1943. After the Second World War, he got a steady job as a singer in the Amsterdam café De Kuil.

=== Breakthrough ===
In 1955, he won a singing competition, the "Jordaan festival", organized by the record company Bovema in collaboration with singer and composer Louis Noiret; the aim was to find the best voices from the Jordaan. His lifelong friend Tante Leen, a notable Jordaan singer in her own right, finished second in the same competition. His first single contained two Noiret compositions, "De Parel van de Jordaan" and "Bij ons in de Jordaan". After being played on an AVRO radio program the single was an instant hit record, propelling Johnny and his Jordaan to national fame—the entire neighborhood, which had been poor and deprived since the 19th century, suddenly became popular due to the success of Johnny Jordaan and others. Cabaret artist and historian Jacques Klöters referred to 1955 as "the year of Johnny Jordaan": he sold hundreds of thousands of records within months, got to perform in the Concertgebouw with Tante Leen, and helped popularize the "uncivilized" Jordaan dialect.

Johnny's own celebrity was made apparent in 1956, when he and his wife celebrated their wedding anniversary by being driven through the Jordaan in a carriage and singing in front of a crowd of 30,000 people: the Polygoon newsreel includes it among the most important events of the year. In the pillarized world of the Netherlands of the 1950s and 1960s, commercial success ("Geef mij maar Amsterdam" sold over a million copies) did not mean receiving airplay with all broadcasting organizations—the socialist VARA, for instance, boycotted his music since it was too low-brow.

=== Later career ===
Financial mismanagement brought him financial ruin; a Jordaan-themed cabaret in Scheveningen was a flop, and a café he opened in Rotterdam in 1962 had to close due to tax debts. He avoided the tax man by leaving for Antwerp to start a café there, but longing for Amsterdam got the better of him and in 1968 he returned, with the help of Tante Leen—though he didn't move to Amsterdam immediately but rather to Beverwijk first, where he lived with his partner, Ton Slierendrecht, before moving to Amsterdam's Staatsliedenbuurt. The record company paid off his debt and Harry de Groot wrote a new song for him, "'n Pikketanussie", a hit song which reinvigorated his career.

=== Farewell ===
His health had always been frail, and in the early 1970s he suffered further hemorrhages and a number of heart attacks. His farewell to his audience was a 1972 television show in collaboration with Tante Leen, Willy Alberti, Ramses Shaffy, Zwarte Riek, Harry de Groot, and songwriter Pi Vèriss. He did occasional shows afterwards and died at age 64, on 8 January 1989. His burial service in the Westerkerk, on 15 January, was attended by a thousand people, including many notables; thousands more crowded the surrounding area and paid their respects. National newspapers noted that many of the visitors were not usual churchgoers, and commented that Johnny had remained a singer of the people. He is buried in the family grave at Vredenhof cemetery.

== Personal life ==
Jordaan had married Jannetje "Totty" de Graaff in 1943 and the couple had a daughter, but he had spent most of his adult life repressing his homosexual feelings. After an affair with a man, he attempted suicide. His homosexuality, a well-known secret, shocked the nation. Since the late 1950s he had a male partner, Ton Slierendrecht; he finally got a divorce from Totty in 1982 to enter a legal union with Slierendrecht.

== Legacy ==
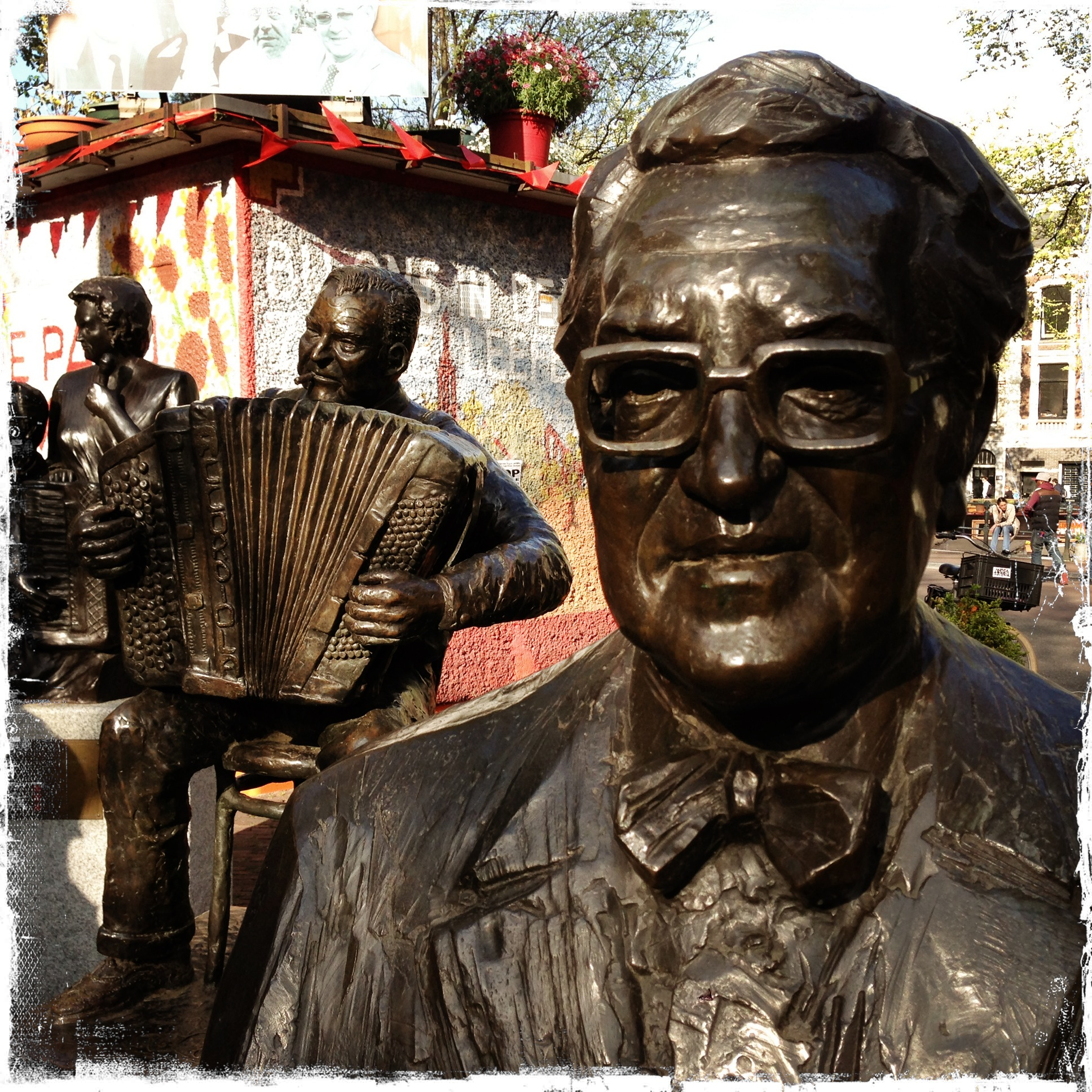
Statue of Johnny Jordaan with Johnny Meijer in the background on the Johnny Jordaanplein, Amsterdam. Photo by Nils Emmink, Amsterdam.

=== Iconic songs, discography ===
Jordaan's best-known songs are "Bij ons in de Jordaan" ("Among us in the Jordaan"), which celebrates the lively culture of the neighborhood, and "Geef mij maar Amsterdam" ("I prefer Amsterdam"), written by Pi Vèriss, which praises the city as preferable over any other, including Paris: "Liever in Mokum zonder poen dan in Parijs met een miljoen" ("I'd rather be penniless in Mokum than a millionaire in Paris").

His songs, especially "Geef mij maar Amsterdam", stand for the city in an emblematic way, and continue to be played at Amsterdam festivities—such as the 2013 championship of Ajax. For some, Amsterdam means Johnny Jordaan.

Tante Leen's homage (and her greatest hit) is a song called "Oh, Johnny"; a version she recorded with him was included on a Tante Leen collection released in 2007 (15 years after her death). Ironically, this song was written by Jaap Valkhoff, who was a famous singer-songwriter from Amsterdam's rival city of Rotterdam.

=== Honors and media ===
The Johnny Jordaanplein ("Johnny Jordaan Square"), off the Elandsgracht in the Jordaan, is named for him; the square contains statues of Jordaan and Tante Leen, and of Jordaan's regular accordionist Johnny Meijer. Since he had lived the last few years of his life in the Staatsliedenbuurt (to the west of the Jordaan), that neighborhood also vied for a square named for him; the singer had really no connection to the Elandsgracht at all, though was engaged in the Edison theater there for a month in 1957. A 1990 benefit concert in the Carré Theatre paid for a bust, which was placed on a parking lot in 1991 off the Elandsgracht. The dispute was fought out in the neighborhoods' newspapers; in the end the Jordaan won out. Local brewery De Prael brews "Johnny", a blonde ale—blonde for his fair hair—and in 2006 the Amsterdam Museum held an exposition to remember him, Geef mij maar Amsterdam.

In 1997, a biographical musical, Oh, Johnny, was performed at the Amsterdams Kleinkunstfestival. Bij ons in de Jordaan was a 2000 biographical television series on VPRO television, which focused mostly on Johnny's struggling with his gay identity in pillarized post-war Netherlands. The first Johnny Jordaan DVD, released in 2005 and also called Bij ons in de Jordaan, entered the DVD music charts at No. 1. The DVD had been compiled by Peter Pols, a lifelong fan of Johnny and later his chauffeur and friend; Pols (Amsterdam, 1948–2009) collected everything related to Johnny and after his death donated his collection to the Amsterdam City Archives.
