= Marnixstraat =

Street in Amsterdam

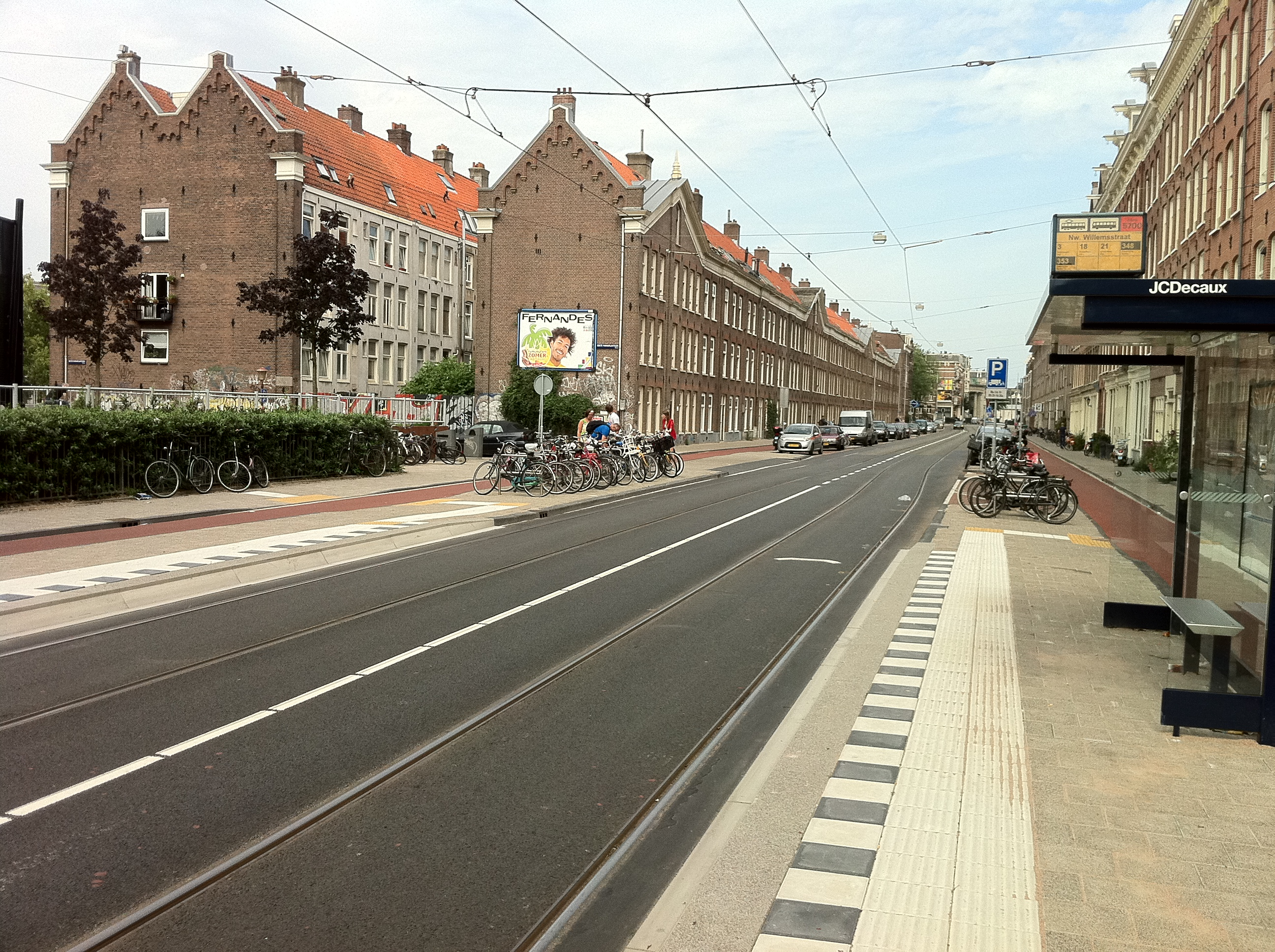
- Marnixstraat
- Interactive map of Marnixstraat
- Namesake: Philips of Marnix, Lord of Saint-Aldegonde
- Type: Street
- Owner: Amsterdam

Marnixstraat is a main street in the Dutch city of Amsterdam, on the western border of the Jordaan in the Amsterdam-Centrum. The street is located between Haarlemmerplein and Leidseplein, parallel to Lijnbaansgracht.

== History ==
Marnixstraat is a main street in Amsterdam which was named after Philips of Marnix, Lord of Saint-Aldegonde, (1538-1598). A large bus depot (Busstation Elandsgracht) and the main police station are located on the Marnixstraat. The street is located between Haarlemmerplein and Leidseplein, parallel to Lijnbaansgracht. It is 2.3 km (2,300 m) from Amsterdam Centraal station. The street is used to host events like the 2022 Pride events. The street also has a Tram line: Trams 7, 10 and 14 all make stops at the Elandsgracht tram stop on the street.

In 2017 the city of Amsterdam began making plans to make the Marnixstraat a bicycle street. The plan was to make the street into a bicycle first street, "...where cars are welcome, but must behave like a guest."

== See also ==
- List of streets in Amsterdam
