= Johnny Meijer =

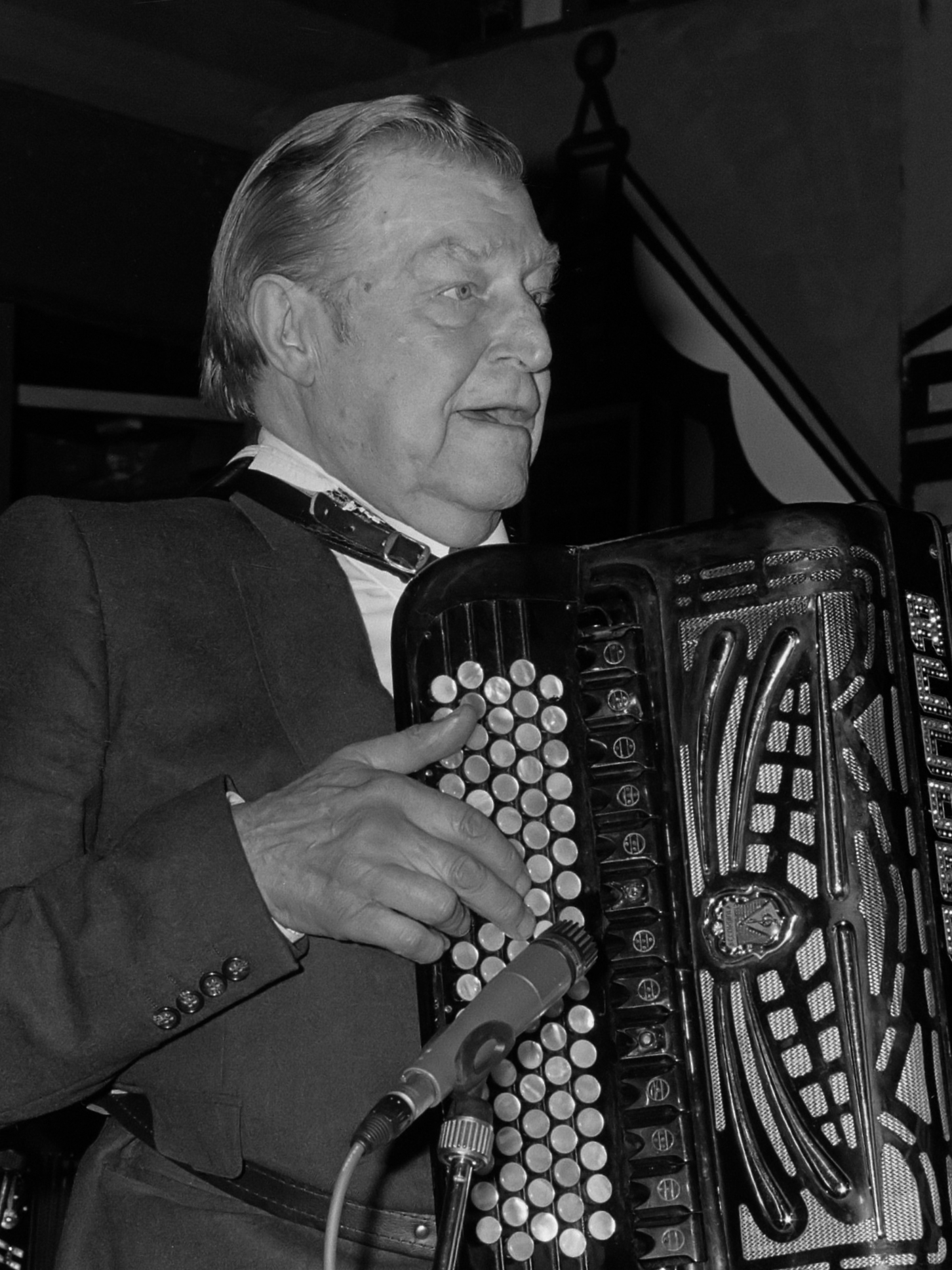
- Meijer in 1987

Background information
- Birth name: Jan Cornelis Meijer
- Born: 1 October 1912; Amsterdam, The Netherlands
- Died: 8 January 1992 (aged 79); Amsterdam, The Netherlands
- Genres: Classical; folk; swing; jazz
- Occupation: Accordionist
- Instrument: Accordion

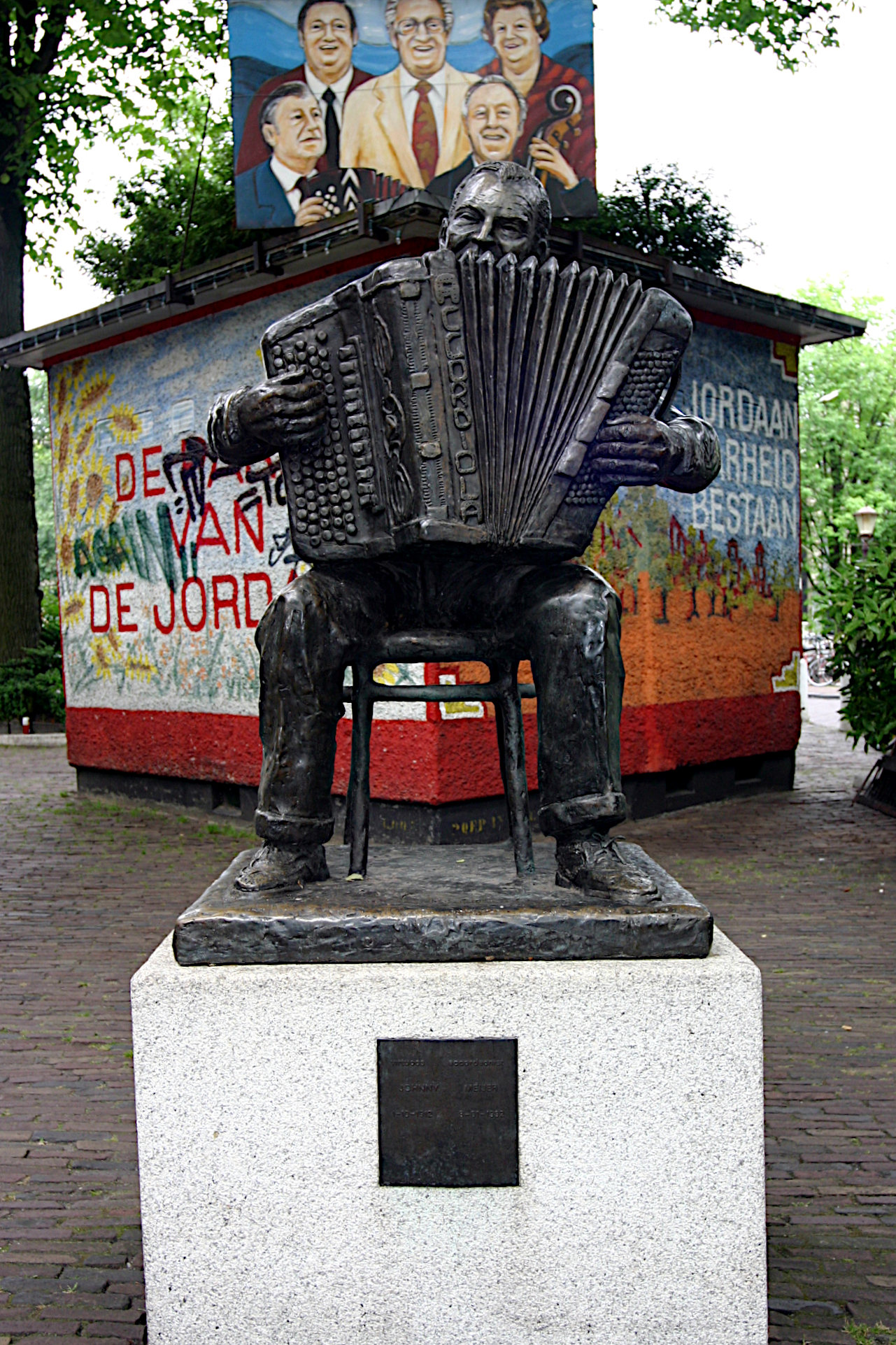
Statue of Johnny Meijer in Amsterdam

Johnny Meijer (born 'Jan Cornelis Meijer' 1 October 1912 in Amsterdam; died 8 January 1992 in Amsterdam) was a Dutch accordionist who played classical, folk, and swing.

For a time he was known as a jazz accordionist and his 75th birthday was celebrated at the North Sea Jazz Festival. He was also the subject of a film.

Besides the popular songs he also played fast swing numbers, Romanian music and classical pieces and was widely recognized as a virtuoso jazz accordionist. In 1974 he recorded the Dutch Swing College Band Johnny Goes Dixie LP, which went gold.

He will be remembered primarily as a live performer of folk music in Amsterdam. He was typically seen during performances with a cigar in his mouth, and his accordion (which can be seen at the Gert Nijkamp Muziekhuis in Apeldoorn) shows several burn marks as a result of this. In the last years of his life, Johnny Meyer was rarely invited to play large performances, mainly in connection with his short temper and his drinking, and thus the King of the Accordion saw out his final days mostly in silence, occasionally playing at weddings and parties.

In a televised interview during the North Sea Jazz Festival 2015 Richard Galliano specifically named Johnny Meyer as a major influence on his work.
