= The Holland Times =

English-language Dutch newspaper

Front page of The Holland Times, February 2015

The Holland Times (formerly Amsterdam Times) is an English-language newspaper in the Netherlands.

The Holland Times is a monthly magazine published by Argo Media. It publishes an overview of local news from the past month, as well as in-depth current affairs articles.

The Holland Times produces articles written by staff and freelance writers who do their own research, interviews and investigative reporting.

The Holland Times was adapted to a monthly magazine from a weekly paper in 2008, by then-editor in chief Laura Owings and managing editor Alexis Tatem. It was during that time that it grew in exposure, advertising sales and quality of reporting, and began publishing online. The paper was taken over by Declan Aylward in 2010.

The Holland Times also organizes literary events in Amsterdam with the cooperation of the American Book Center in Amsterdam. Amongst these is the annual publication of the Flash Fiction novel.
