= List of Second Boer War Monuments in the Netherlands =

The Second Boer War was a war in South Africa between the independent states of the Orange Free State and the South African Republic against the British Empire, ultimately resulting in a British victory. During the war the Netherlands was largely pro-Boer, and some 2000 Dutch volunteers traveled to South Africa to fight for the two Boer republics. This support from the Dutch was due to the relationship between the Dutch and the Afrikaners (also called the Boers) who were mostly descended from the former Dutch colonists in South Africa.

During and after the Second Boer War a number of monuments were erected in the Netherlands to commemorate this war.

The following list is not complete.

Monument	Year of Construction	Depicted person/In honour of	Place	Comment
List of Second Boer War Monuments in the Netherlands is located in Netherlands	1899–present	Places where a district, neighbourhood, or streets are named after a person from the Orange Free State or the South African Republic.	Found throughout the Netherlands	Since 1899, there are streets throughout the Netherlands which are named after Afrikaners from the South African Republic and the Orange Free State. This is the result not only of widespread Dutch support for the Boer cause, but also from the visit and travels of presidents Paul Kruger (in 1900–01), Martinus Theunis Steyn (in 1903), and the generals Louis Botha, Koos de la Rey, and Christiaan de Wet (all in 1903) as well as general and later prime minister of the Union of South Africa, Jan Smuts, in 1948.
	1900	De Transvaalsche Boer (The Transvaal Boer) South African Republic	Gasthuismolensteeg 20 Amsterdam	In 1900 the building on Gasthuismolensteeg was renovated and the cigar shop De Transvaalsche Boer (The Transvaal Boer) was established there. A small statue of the Transvaal Boer by Johann Zeitz was also added there in commemoration of the war.
	1901	Portraits of four Boer leaders Orange Free State; South African Republic	Blekerssingel Gouda	On the residences the Wapen van Amsterdam there are four portraits of different leaders of the two Boer republics. Depicted are Marthinus Theunis Steyn (president of the Orange Free State), Piet Retief (a Voortrekker leader), Paul Kruger (president of the South African Republic) and Petrus Jacobus Joubert (general). The fifth portrait is not a Boer leader, but rather an advocate that assisted the former owner of the building in a civil procedure. These portraits hang above the windows and door of the three houses. The sculptures were made by Christiaan Petrus Clemens (1842–88).
	1901	Plaque to commemorate Herman Coster South African Republic; Netherlands	Academiegebouw Leiden	At the entrance of the Academiegebouw of the Leiden University there is a plaque in commemoration of Leiden alumni Herman Coster who died in the Battle of Elandslaagte in 1899. Coster was a state's advocate of the South African Republic between 1895 and 1897.
	1921	Christiaan de Wet General; Seventh and last president Orange Free State	Otterlose Zand Hoge Veluwe National Park	On the plinth other Boer soldiers are also depicted. The statue was made by Joseph Mendes da Costa at the order of Helene Kröller-Müller.
	1922	Marthinus Theunis Steyn Sixth president Orange Free State	Rijsterborgherpark Deventer	This monument was a frequent site of anti-apartheid demonstrations during the period 1960–90.
	1920-24	De Raadsman Marthinus Theunis Steyn; Sixth president Orange Free State	Jachthuis Sint-Hubertus Hoge Veluwe National Park	Mendes da Costa had depicted a figure of a raadsman in honour of president Steyn. Helene Kröller-Müller did not find the design suitable to offer to South Africa.
	1923-24	President Steyn bench Orange Free State	Hoge Veluwe National Park	
	1952	Paul Kruger Fifth president South African Republic	Formerly: Buitenplaats Oranjelust; Maliebaan 89; Utrecht	This monument was designed by Isabella van Beeck Calkoen. So far as is known this is the only monument of Paul Kruger in the Netherlands. In 2011 this monument was deemed to be in a poor state. On top of the frieze of Paul Kruger is the number of the building.
