= Hoenderloo =

- Village
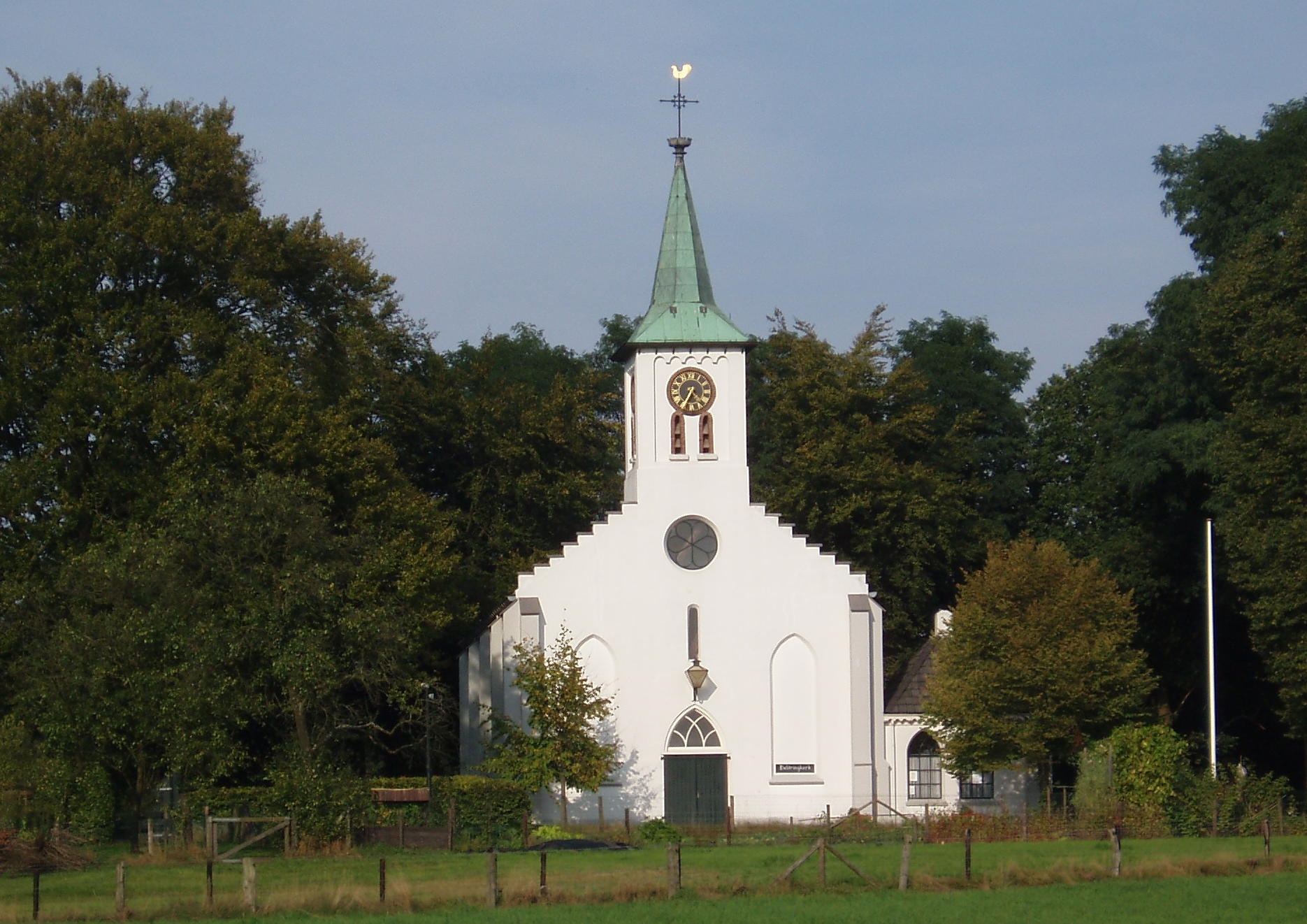
- Heldring Church in 2006

- Location in the province of Gelderland Hoenderloo (Netherlands)
- Coordinates: 52°7′5″N 5°52′49″E
- Country: Netherlands
- Province: Gelderland
- Municipality: Apeldoorn; Ede

Area
  - Total: 48.78 km^{2} (18.83 sq mi)
- Elevation: 50 m (160 ft)

Population (2021)
  - Total: 1,500
  - Density: 31/km^{2} (80/sq mi)
- Time zone: UTC+1 (CET)
  - Summer (DST): UTC+2 (CEST)
- Postal code: 7351
- Dialing code: 055
- Website: www.hoenderloo.nl

Hoenderloo (Dutch pronunciation: [ˈɦundərloː]) is a Dutch village located south west of the city of Apeldoorn. Most of the village is part of the municipality of Apeldoorn, but a small part belongs to the municipality of Ede, among which the hamlet Hoog Baarlo.

The village is located in the Southern part of the Veluwe and close to the national park Hoge Veluwe and the Deelerwoud. It is a very touristic village, with a large number of camping sites, recreation parks, restaurants, hotels and shops.

== History ==
It was first mentioned in 1748 as "Hoender Lo Struycken", and means forest with galliformes. In 1813, the shephard Albert Brinkenberg becomes the first official resident. In 1840, there were 24 sod houses at the site.

In 1841, during his travels the vicar Ottho Heldring stumbled upon the remote village and decided to invest in the village by building a well, a school in 1846 and a church in 1858.

In 1848, a predecessor of the current Hoenderloo Group, at that time an institution for underprivileged boys, was founded. The current incarnation of this institution is still referred to as “The Boys House”, although it is not only for boys any more.

In the late-19th century, Hoenderloo became home to nobility and rich businesspeople who built their country estates. The area later developed into a recreational site for tourists.

The inn "De Woeste Hoeve" is located to the east of Hoenderloo and was built in 1771 along the road from Apeldoorn to Arnhem. In March 1945, there was attempted assassination of Hanns Albin Rauter, the highest SS and Police Leader of the Netherlands, at De Woeste Hoeve. As a reprisal 117 people from various prisons were executed near De Woeste Hoeve on 8 March 1945. In 1992, a monument was revealed at the spot with the list of their names except for one who is still unidentified.

Jachthuis Sint-Hubertus is a former residence of the Kröller-Müller couple (Anton and Helene) designed by Hendrik Petrus Berlage which was completed in 1920. In 1935, the building was donated to the Dutch States. It is sometimes open for visitors.

== Sports and recreation ==
The village is located along the European hiking route E11, locally known as the Marskramerpad or Handelsweg. The E11 runs all the way from The Hague to the east, at the present time all the way to the border between Poland and Lithuania. The town's football club was s.v. Beatrix.

== Notable residents ==
- Composer Jan Ingenhoven (1876-1951) died in Hoenderloo
- A. den Doolaard, writer (born 7 February 1901, in Zwolle - died 26 June 1994 in Hoenderloo)
- Evert Jan Harmsen, politician Boerenpartij (born 22 July 1930, in Steenderen - died 23 October 2005, in Hoenderloo)

== Gallery ==
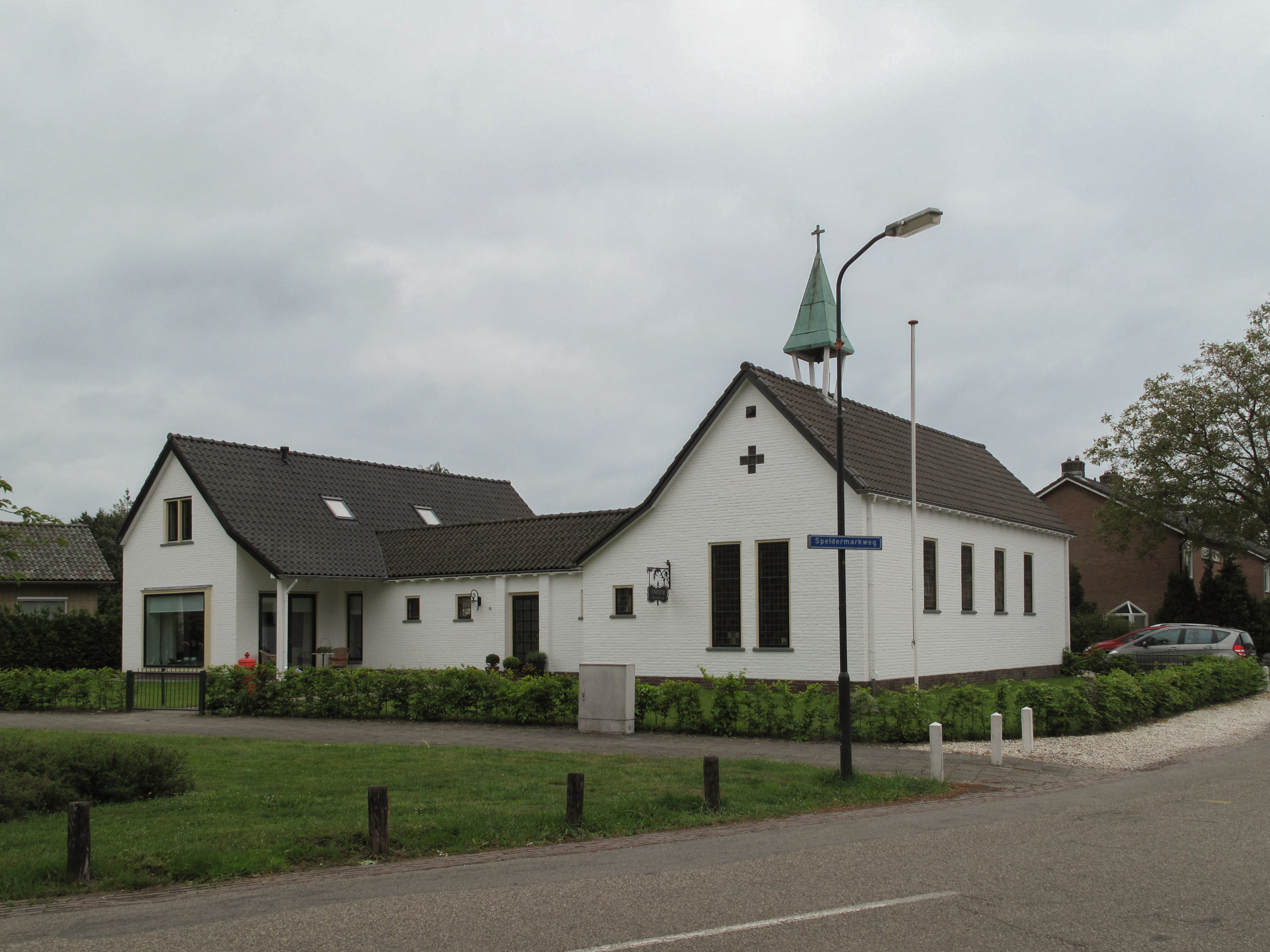
Former church now used as an art studio

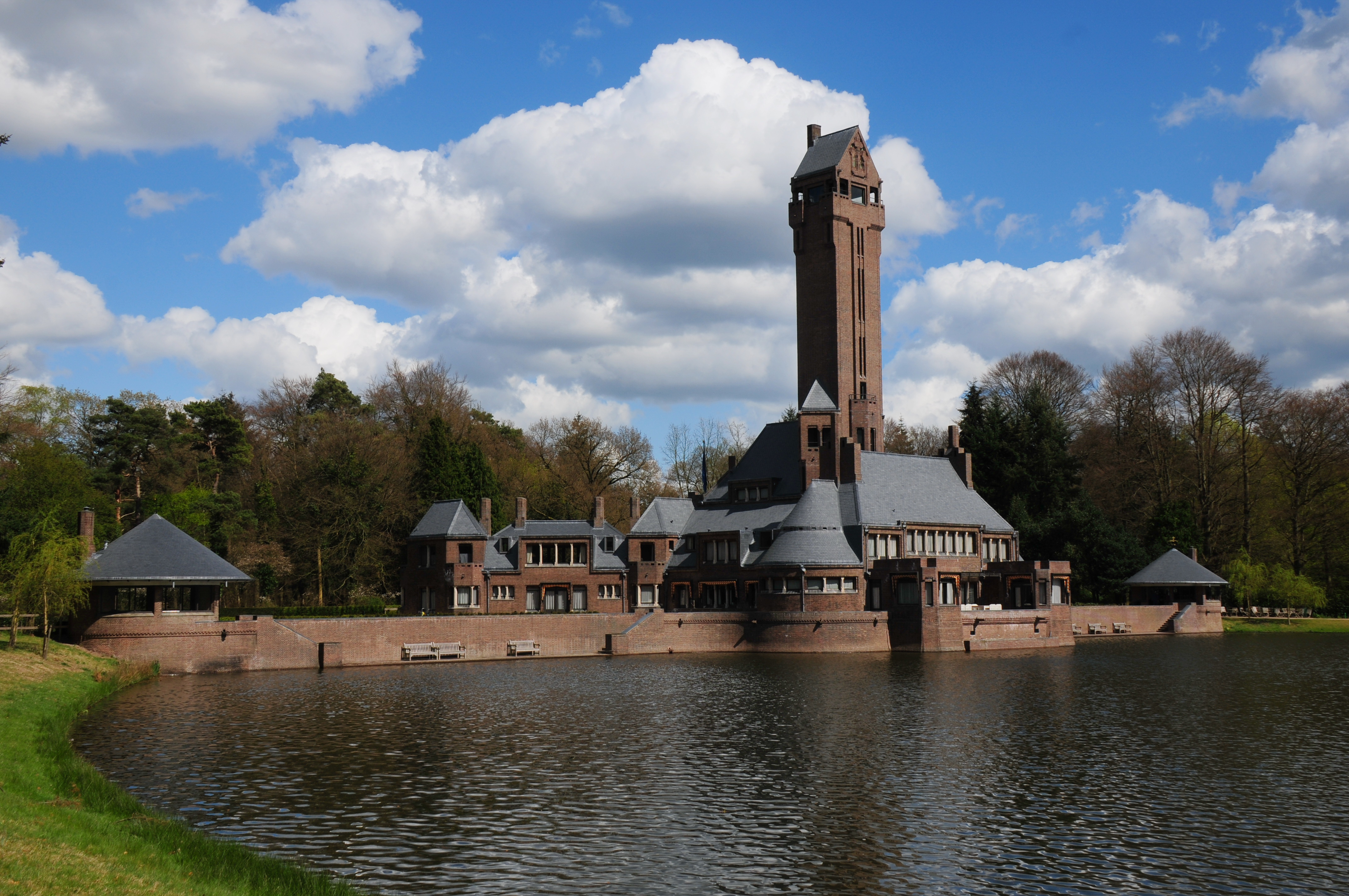
Castle Hubertus

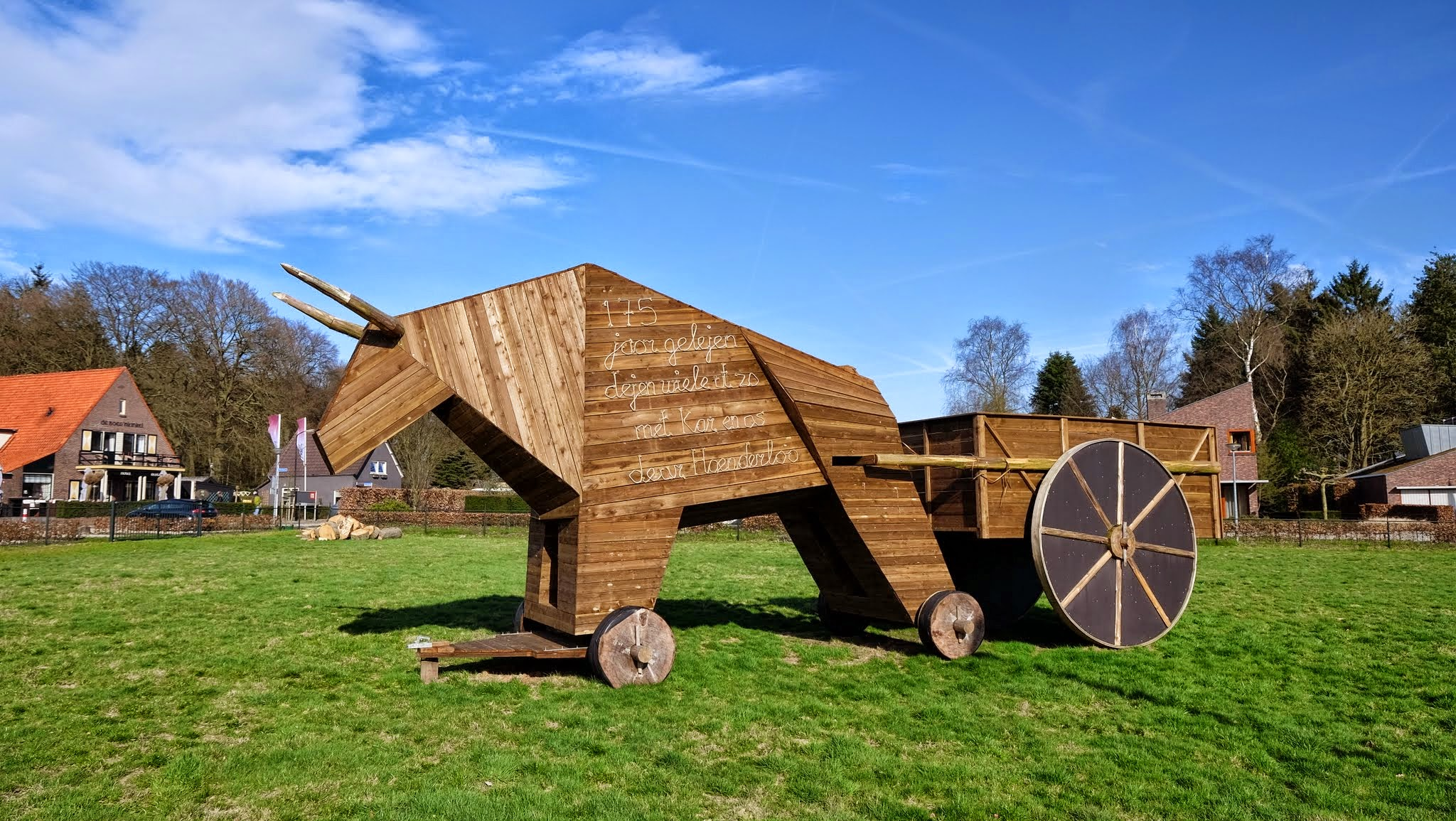
Trojan bull in Hoenderloo

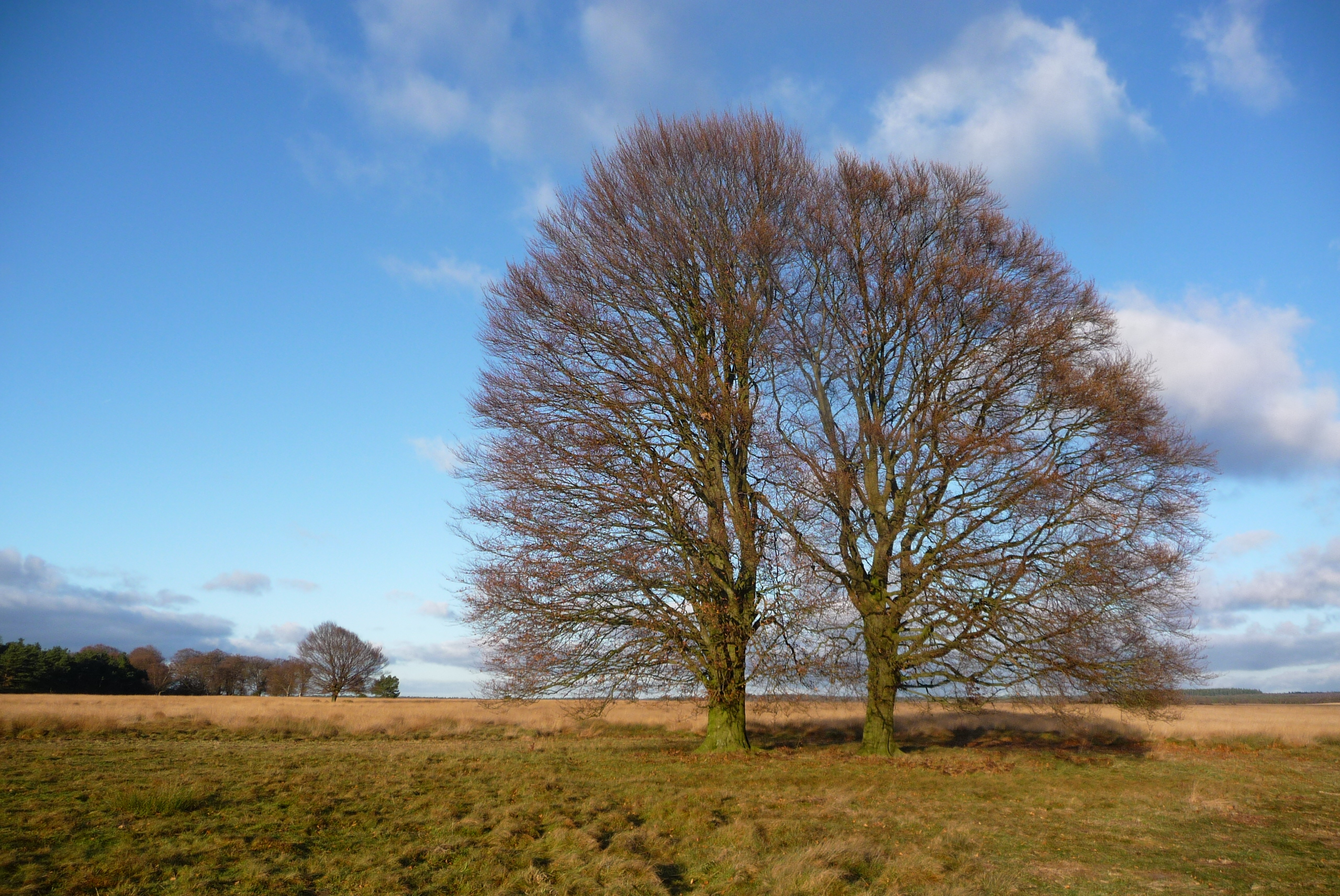
Two beeches in the park
