= Road with Cypress and Star =

1890 painting by Vincent van Gogh

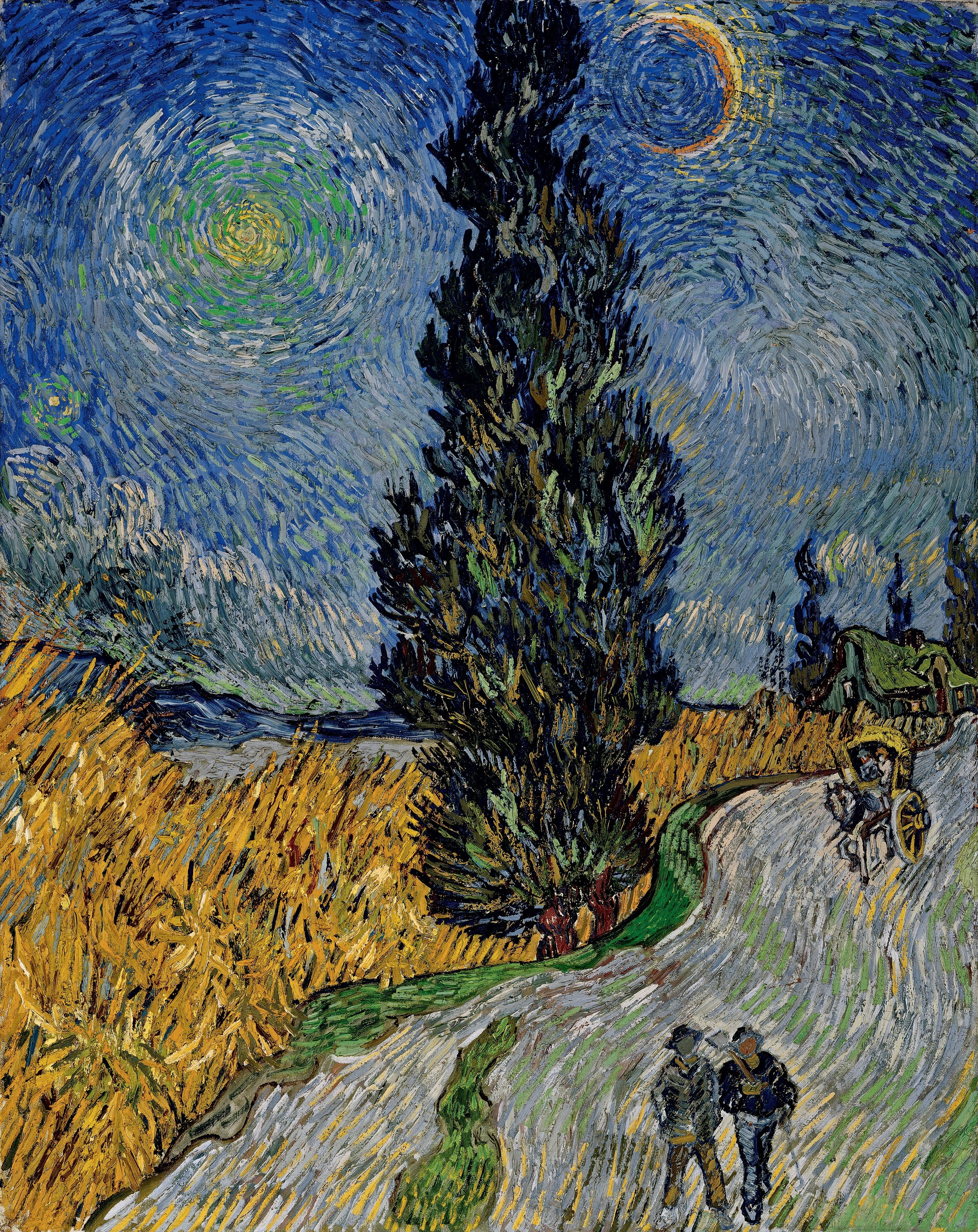
- Artist: Vincent van Gogh
- Year: 1890
- Catalogue: F683; JH1982
- Medium: Oil on canvas
- Movement: Post Impressionism
- Dimensions: 92 cm × 73 cm (36 in × 29 in)
- Location: Kröller-Müller Museum; Otterlo, Netherlands

Road with Cypress and Star (Dutch: Cypres bij sterrennacht), also known as Country Road in Provence by Night, is an 1890 oil-on-canvas painting by Dutch post-Impressionist painter Vincent van Gogh. It is the last painting he made in Saint-Rémy-de-Provence, France. The painting is part of the large van Gogh collection of the Kröller-Müller Museum, located in the Hoge Veluwe National Park at Otterlo in the Netherlands.

== Production and influences ==
Road with Cypress and Star was painted in May 1890. In an earlier letter to his brother Theo, van Gogh wrote that cypresses were "always occupying [his] thoughts" and that he found them "beautiful of line" and proportioned like an Egyptian obelisk. He had also intended on painting a night-time view of the trees since his stay in Arles in 1888.

Erickson suggests that the painting is influenced by the Christian allegory The Pilgrim's Progress, visible in the prominent road and cypress tree. The painting is one of several in which van Gogh uses cypresses prominently, and — as in Road with Cypress and Star — many of the paintings depict trees that extend beyond the top of the canvas. After finishing the work, in June 1890 while at Auvers-sur-Oise, van Gogh wrote to his friend and fellow artist Paul Gauguin that the painting's themes are similar to those of Gauguin's work Christ in the Garden of Olives.

The orientation of the night sky objects may have been influenced by a conjunction of heavenly bodies on 20 April 1890, when Mercury and Venus were at 3 degrees of separation and together had luminescence comparable to Sirius.

== Analysis ==
According to Kathleen Powers Erickson, Road with Cypress and Star more strongly reflects van Gogh's belief that he would soon die than the earlier painting The Starry Night. She supports this by comparing the evening star on the left of the painting, which is barely visible, to the emerging crescent moon on the right side; the cypress tree in the middle, which divides these symbols of the old and the new, is described as an "obelisk of death". an indication of van Gogh's need for companionship.

Naomi Maurer also writes that Road with Cypress and Star reflects the painter's feeling that he would soon die. She views the painting as depicting human life as being "in the context of infinity and eternity", with the two travelers and their journey dominated by the cypress in the centre. The evening star and crescent moon on either side of the tree she describes as adding "cosmic perspective to the earthly scene" and suggesting a "sentient universe filled with love".

== See also ==
- List of works by Vincent van Gogh
