= Jardin d'émail =

Large painted outdoor sculpture in the Netherlands

- English: Enamel Garden
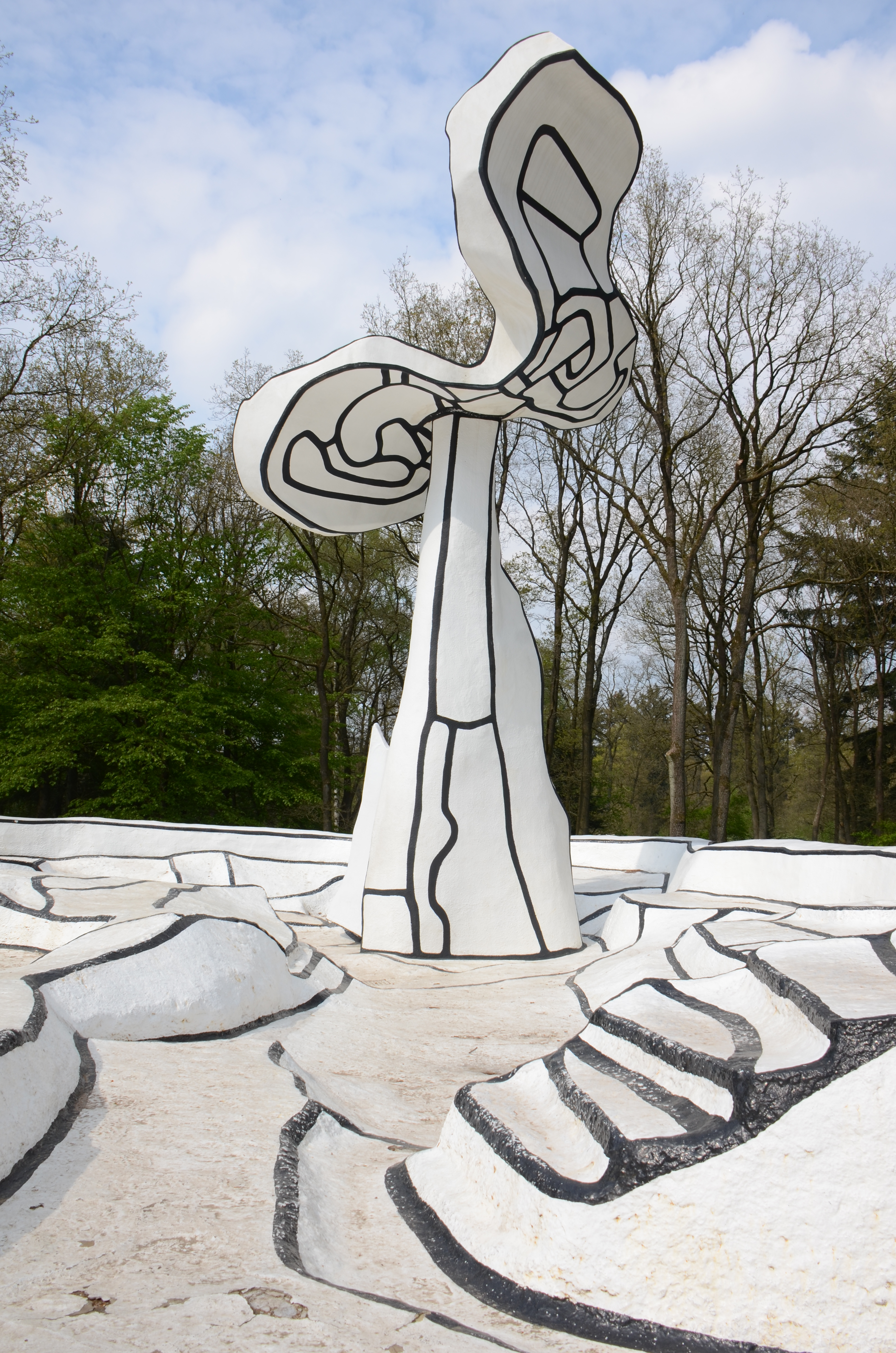
- Jardin d'émail at Art garden Hoge Veluwe Holland. Butterfly statue from Jean Dubuffet in the Jardin d'émail (1974)
- Artist: Jean Dubuffet
- Year: 1968
- Medium: Concrete, glass fiber reinforced epoxy resin, polyurethane and paint
- Subject: Abstract art
- Dimensions: 8 m (26 ft) cm × 20 m (66 ft) cm × 30 m (98 ft) cm ( × ×)
- Condition: Restored in 2020
- Location: Kröller-Müller Museum, Otterlo
- 52.095556°N 5.821389°E
- Owner: Kröller-Müller Museum

Jardin d'émail (1968-1974) also known as Enamel garden is an outdoor sculpture in the Kröller-Müller Museum in Otterlo, The Netherlands. The sculpture was created by artist Jean Dubuffet. The artwork was designed for the Kröller-Müller Museum.

== History ==
From 1968-1974 artist Jean Dubuffet completed the Jardin d'émail sculpture. In English the work is called Enamel garden. The materials used in the work include: Concrete, glass fiber reinforced epoxy resin, polyurethane and paint. It is a large sculpture which is billed as: "A work of art that you can touch, that you can walk through, in which you are even allowed to play!". The dimensions of the work are 8 m (26 ft) x 20 m (66 ft) x 30 m (98 ft). The artwork was designed specifically for the Kröller-Müller Museum.

In 2020 the sculpture was closed while it underwent a restoration. The surface of the artwork was in poor condition which necessitated the "complete removal of its painted surface and innovative planning for the precise replication". Care was taken to follow the artist's original paint scheme and pattern. The restoration process made use of photogrammetry (3D imaging technique that uses photographs to make 3D models) to reproduce the artist Hand-painted markings on what was a very large surface area.

== Design ==
The piece is designed with a stark white color interspersed with jagged black lines. Visitors can walk on the surfaces of the sculpture and interact with it.

== See also ==
- List of outdoor sculptures in the Netherlands
