= A Lane in the Public Garden at Arles =

1888 painting by Vincent van Gogh

A Lane in a Public Garden in Arles
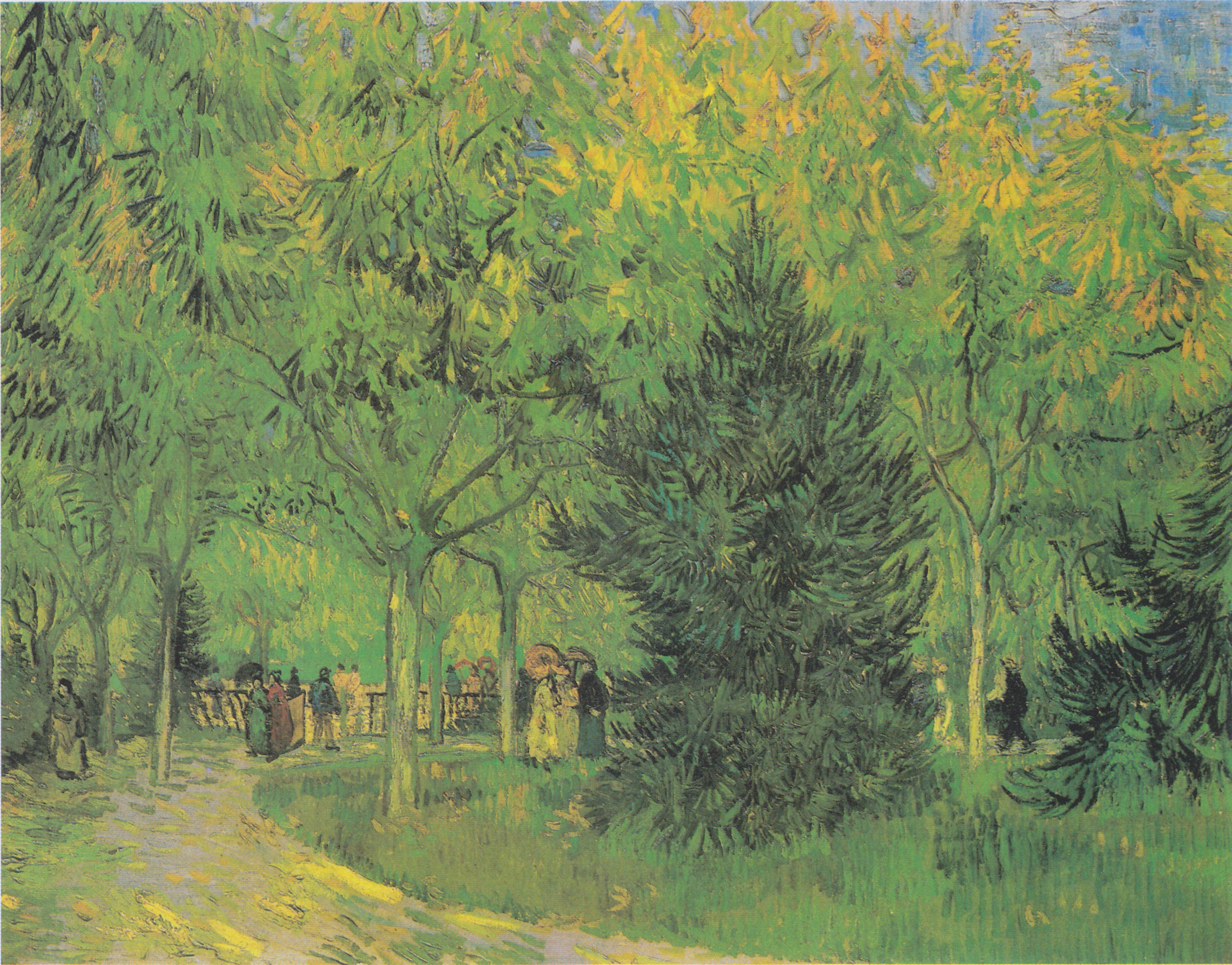
- Artist: Vincent van Gogh
- Year: September 1888
- Catalogue: F470; JH1582
- Medium: Oil on canvas
- Dimensions: 73 cm × 92 cm (29 in × 36 in)
- Location: Kröller-Müller Museum; Otterlo, Netherlands

A Lane in a Public Garden in Arles is an 1888 painting by Vincent van Gogh depicting a lane running through the public garden in Arles.

The painting is held at the Kröller-Müller Museum in the Netherlands.

== Description ==
The lane is surrounded by trees in different shades of green and yellow, as summer is being replaced by fall. The sky is blue and people are out walking on the lane enjoying the nice surroundings. A Lane in the Public Garden at Arles offers a harmonious vista where van Gogh's exquisite command of colors allows him to blend the different shades of green and yellow with the blue of the sky and the stones of the lane.

Van Gogh produced the painting in mid-September 1888, shortly after he had completed another view of the park: The Poet's Garden (F468). Van Gogh depicted the park in other works during this period, including: Entrance to the Public Park in Arles (F566), and The Public Park at Arles (F472).

== See also ==
- List of works by Vincent van Gogh
