= Woman on Her Deathbed =

1883 painting by Vincent van Gogh

- Opgebaarde vrouw (Dutch)
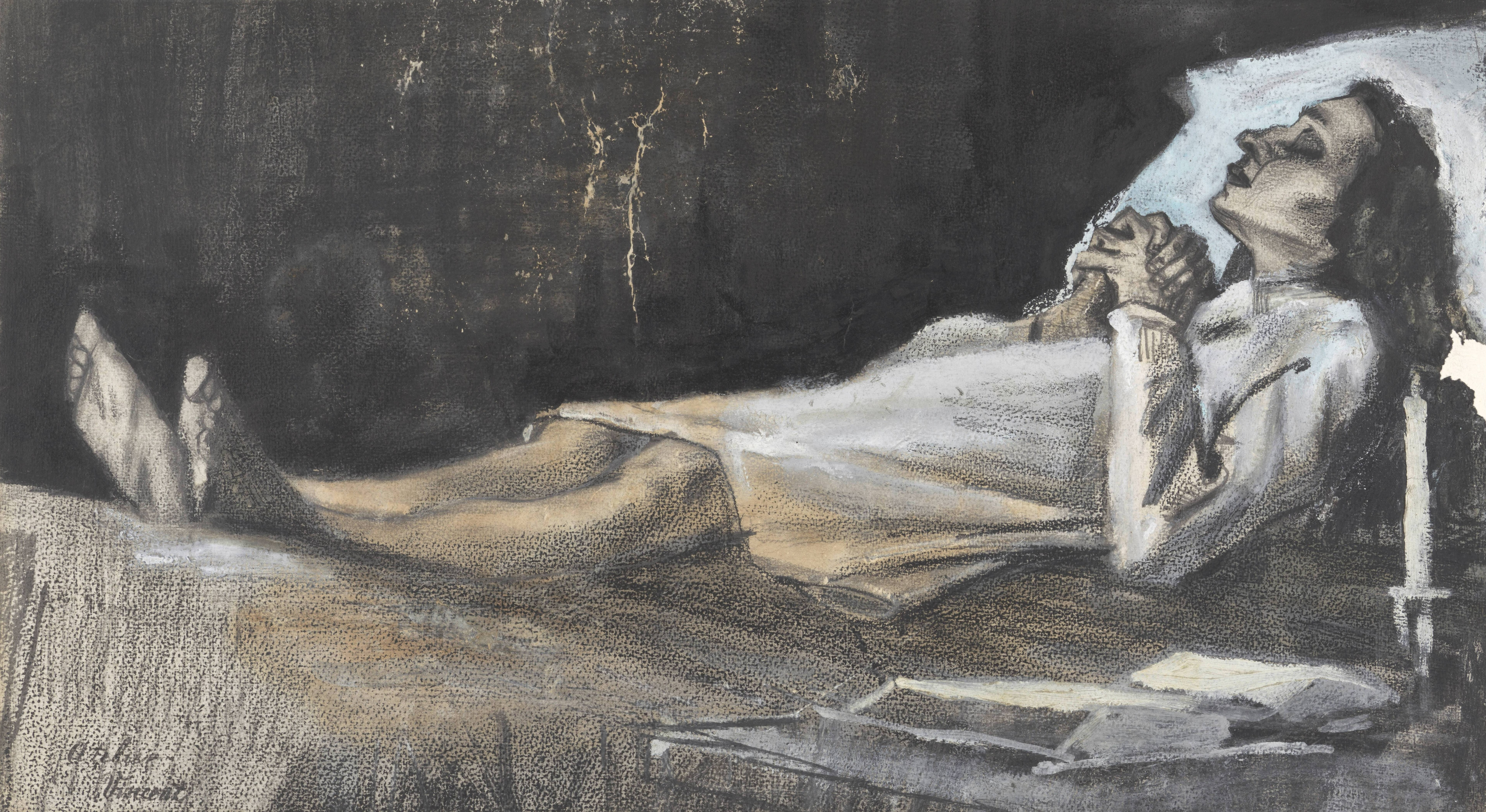
- Artist: Vincent van Gogh
- Year: April 1883
- Catalogue: F841, JH359
- Medium: Pencil, chalk, and watercolor on paper
- Dimensions: 34.5 cm × 63.2 cm (13.6 in × 24.9 in)
- Location: Kröller-Müller Museum, Otterlo

Woman on Her Deathbed is a mixed-media drawing created with pencil, black lithographic chalk, brush in black and white oils, and grey opaque watercolor on watercolor paper, created in April 1883 by Vincent van Gogh. It is in the collection of the Kröller-Müller Museum in Otterlo, Netherlands.

== See also ==
- Early works of Vincent van Gogh
- List of works by Vincent van Gogh
