= Museonder =

Coordinates: 52.0981°N 5.8292°E

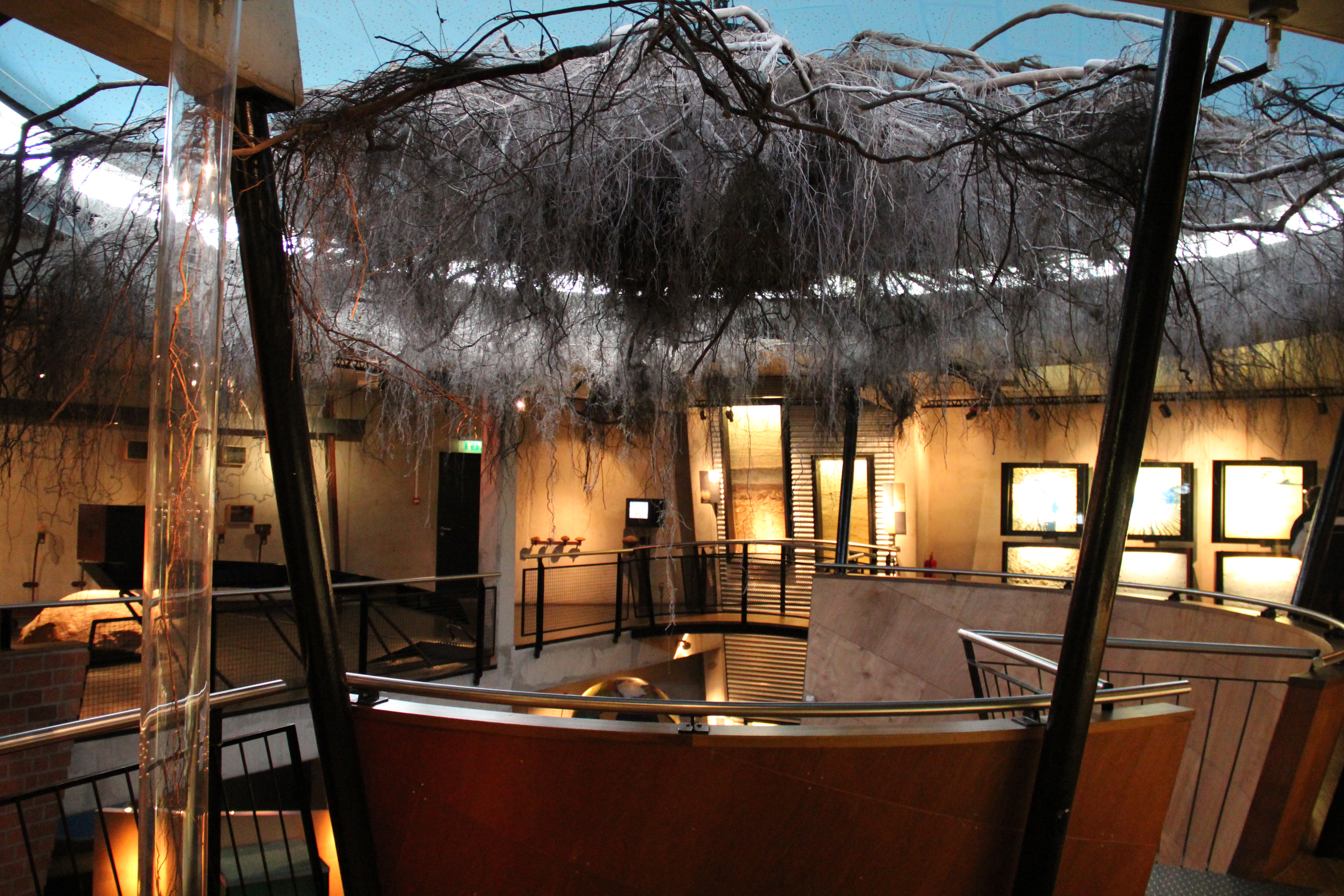
The root system of a 135 year old tree as preserved in the Museonder

The Museonder is a Dutch museum in the De Hoge Veluwe National Park The museum focuses on the geology and biology of the Veluwe and calls itself the world's first fully underground museum. The name "Museonder" is a portmanteau of the Dutch words for "museum" and "under", respectively "museum" and "onder".

== History ==
The museum was opened in March 1993 by Prince Claus of the Netherlands. It was immediately praised for its modern approach to presenting information. Within six months it was reported that the number of visitors to the national park had risen by nearly half, largely due to the new museum. It was also made public that the museum suffered from vandalism and needed to hire more guards and to repair parts of the exhibition.

In 2008, the directorate of the national park announced renovations to the park, including the Museonder. The museum would host changing exhibitions, in addition to the permanent presentation.

== Collection ==
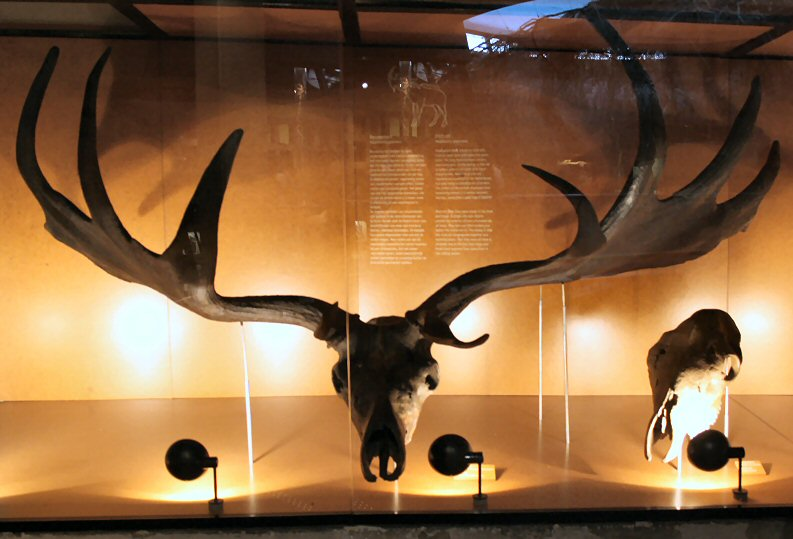
The skull of an Irish Elk on display

The museum collection includes skeletal remains of extant and extinct species that live and lived in the area. Examples of species on display are the woolly rhinoceros, the cave bear, the straight-tusked elephant and the aurochs. Other exhibited items are glacial erratics and the carefully excavated roots of a 135-year-old tree.
