= Veluwe =

Forest-rich ridge of hills in the Netherlands

Coordinates: 52.1°N 5.9°E

- Region
- Flag
- Interactive map of Veluwe

Area
  - Total: 912 km^{2} (352 sq mi)

Population (2023)
  - Total: 715,729
- Website: www.visitveluwe.nl

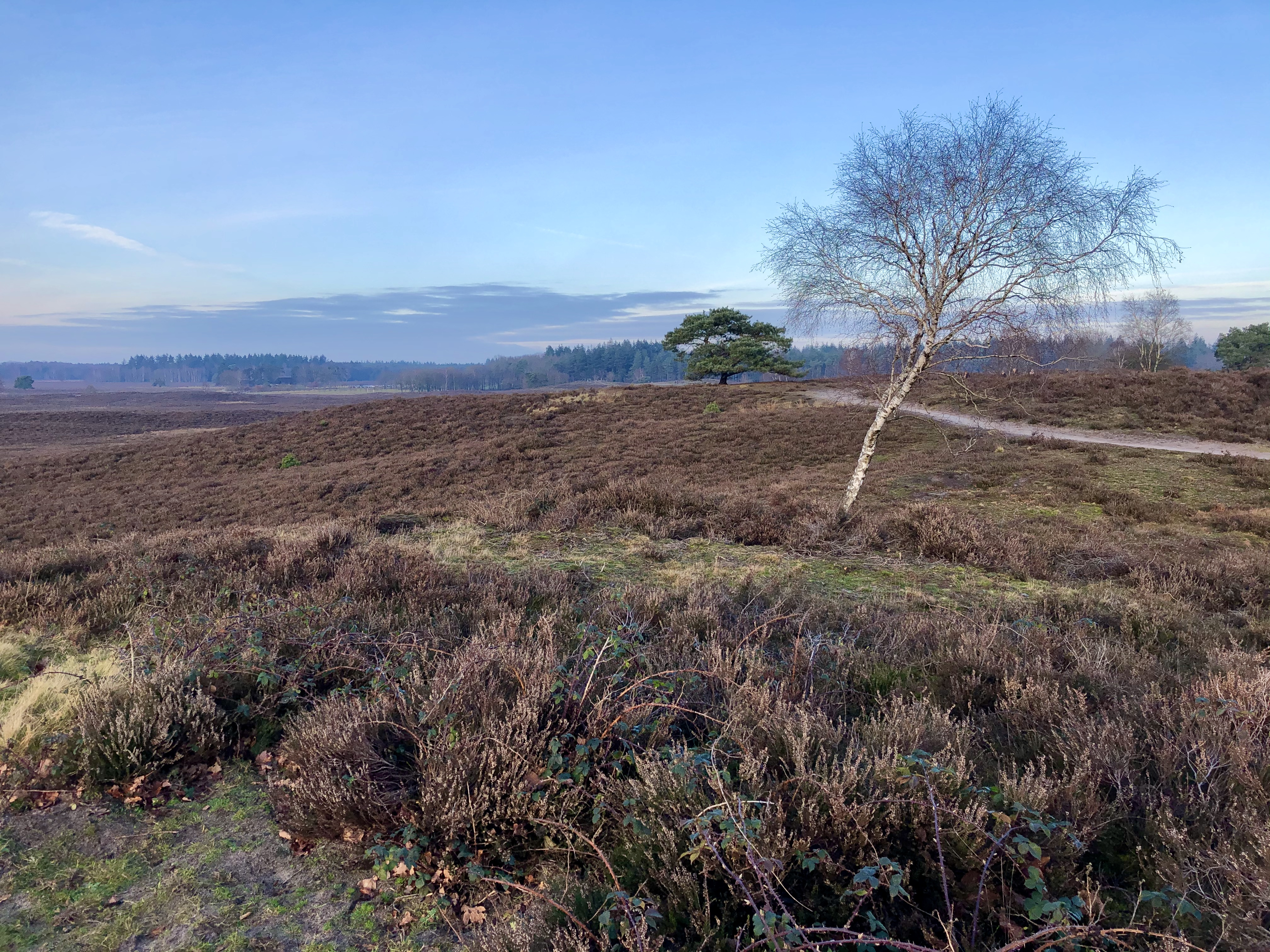
Heath on the Renderklippen nearby Heerde.

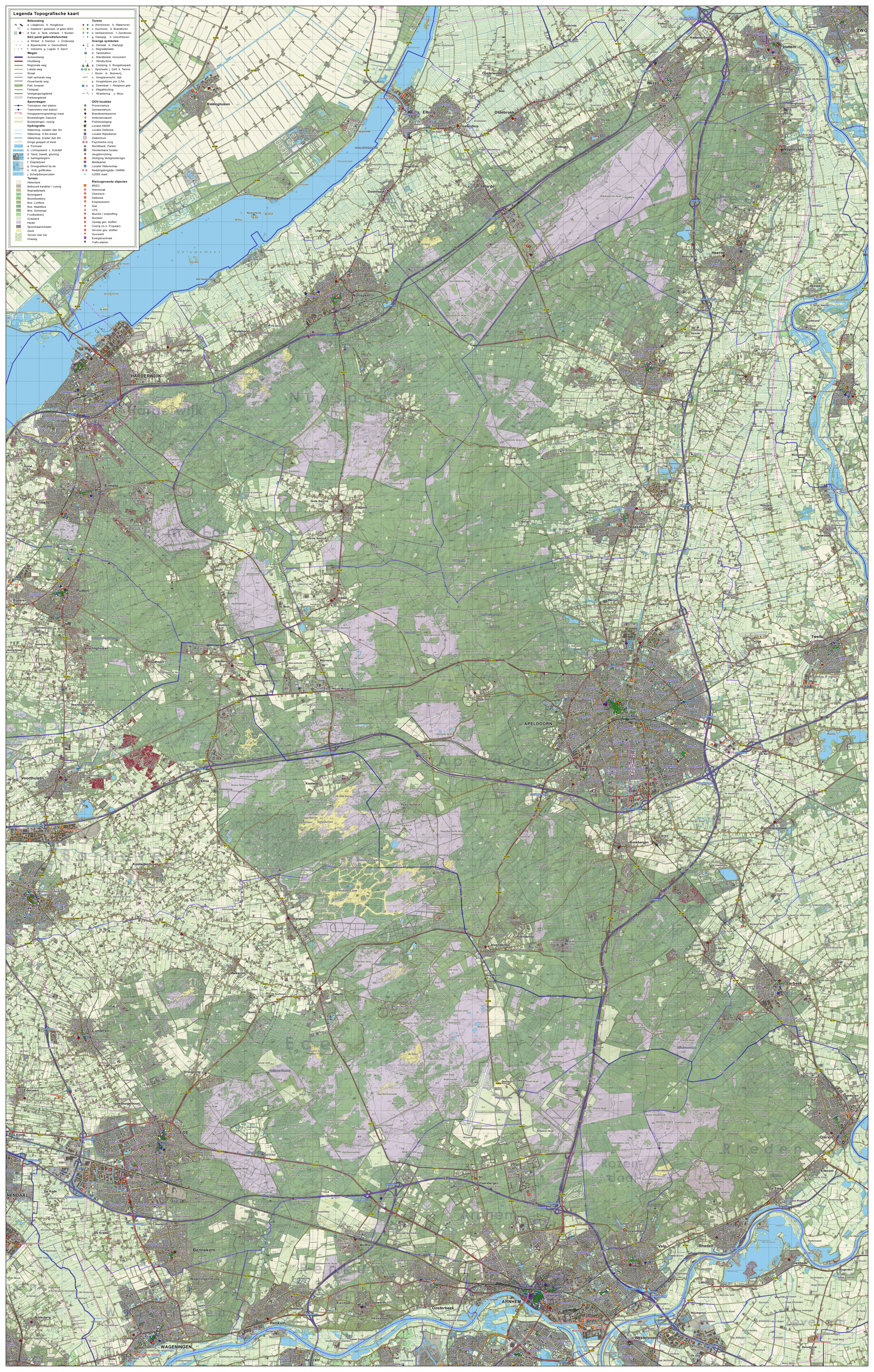
Maps of the Veluwe

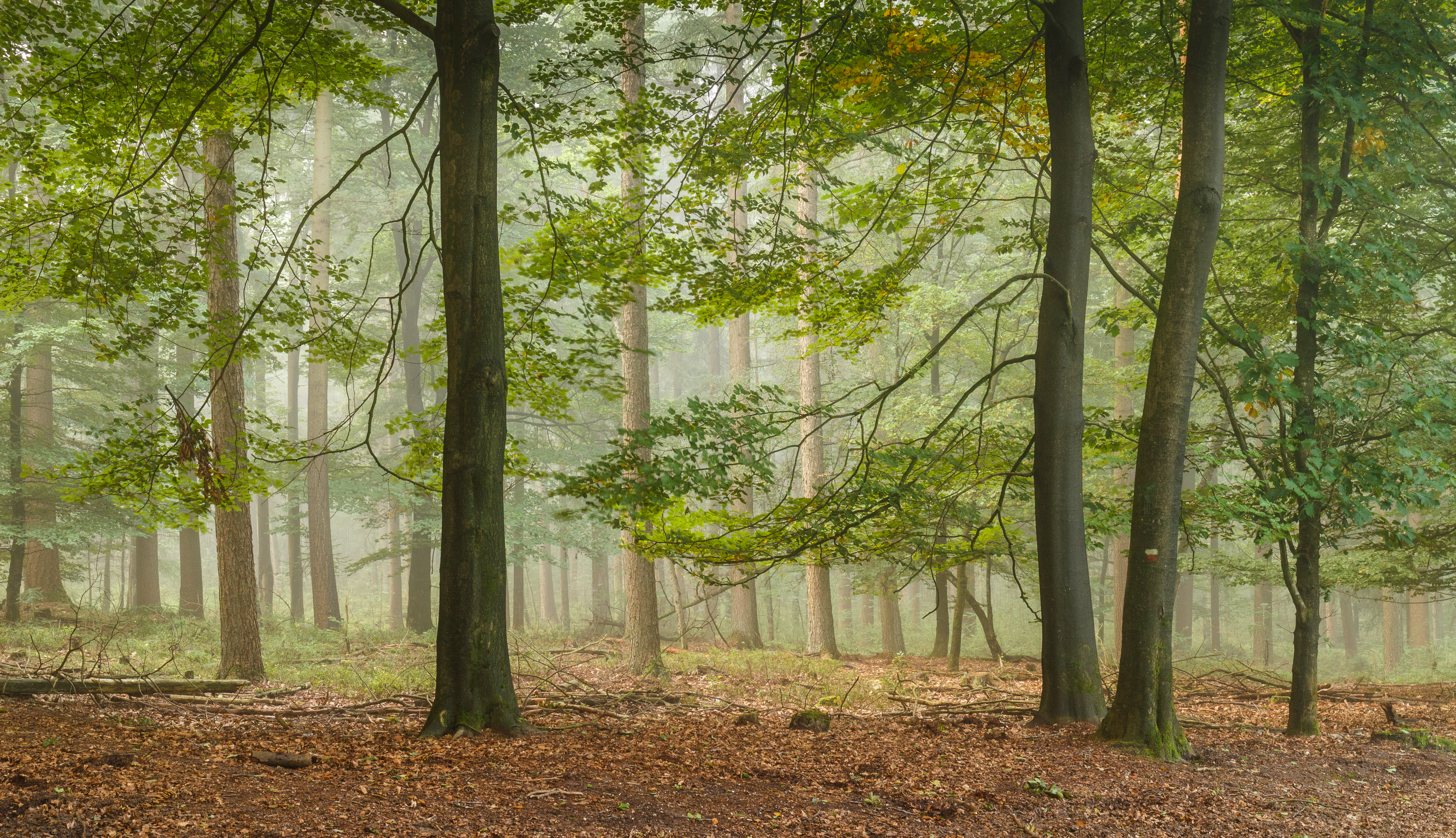
Morning mist hangs over the Planken Wambuis, Ede, in the Veluwe

The Veluwe (Dutch pronunciation: [ˈveːlyʋə]) is a forest-rich ridge of hills (1,100 km^{2}; 420 sq. mi.) in the province of Gelderland in the Netherlands. The Veluwe features many different landscapes, including woodland, heath, some small lakes and Europe's largest sand drifts.

The Veluwe is the largest push moraine complex in the Netherlands, stretching 60 km (37 mi) from north to south, and reaching heights of up to 110 metres (360 ft). The Veluwe was formed by the Saalian glacial during the Pleistocene epoch, some 200,000 years ago. Glaciers some 200 metres (660 ft) thick pushed the sand deposits in the Rhine and Maas Delta sideways, creating the hills which now form most of the Veluwe. Because the hills are made of sand, rain water disappears rapidly, and then it flows at a depth of tens of metres (yards) to the edges where it reaches the surface again.

Originally the Veluwe was surrounded by a string of swamps, heavily populated with game such as deer and wild boar because these areas offered rich vegetation to feed on. Since the 1990s many plans are underway, or have already been implemented, to restore these wetlands by blocking the drainage systems built by farmers during the last 150 years. This results in very dry heathland changing into wetland within a span of just a few hundred metres (yards). The Wisselse Veen near the village of Epe, on the northeastern Veluwe, offers a good example of this.

== Etymology ==
Veluwe derives from Proto-Germanic *falwaz (pale, fallow) and *awjō (island). The name corresponds to "fallow lands" in English and probably was used in opposition to the fertile "good lands" of the Betuwe (from *bataz, good, and *awjō, island) to the south.

== Geography ==
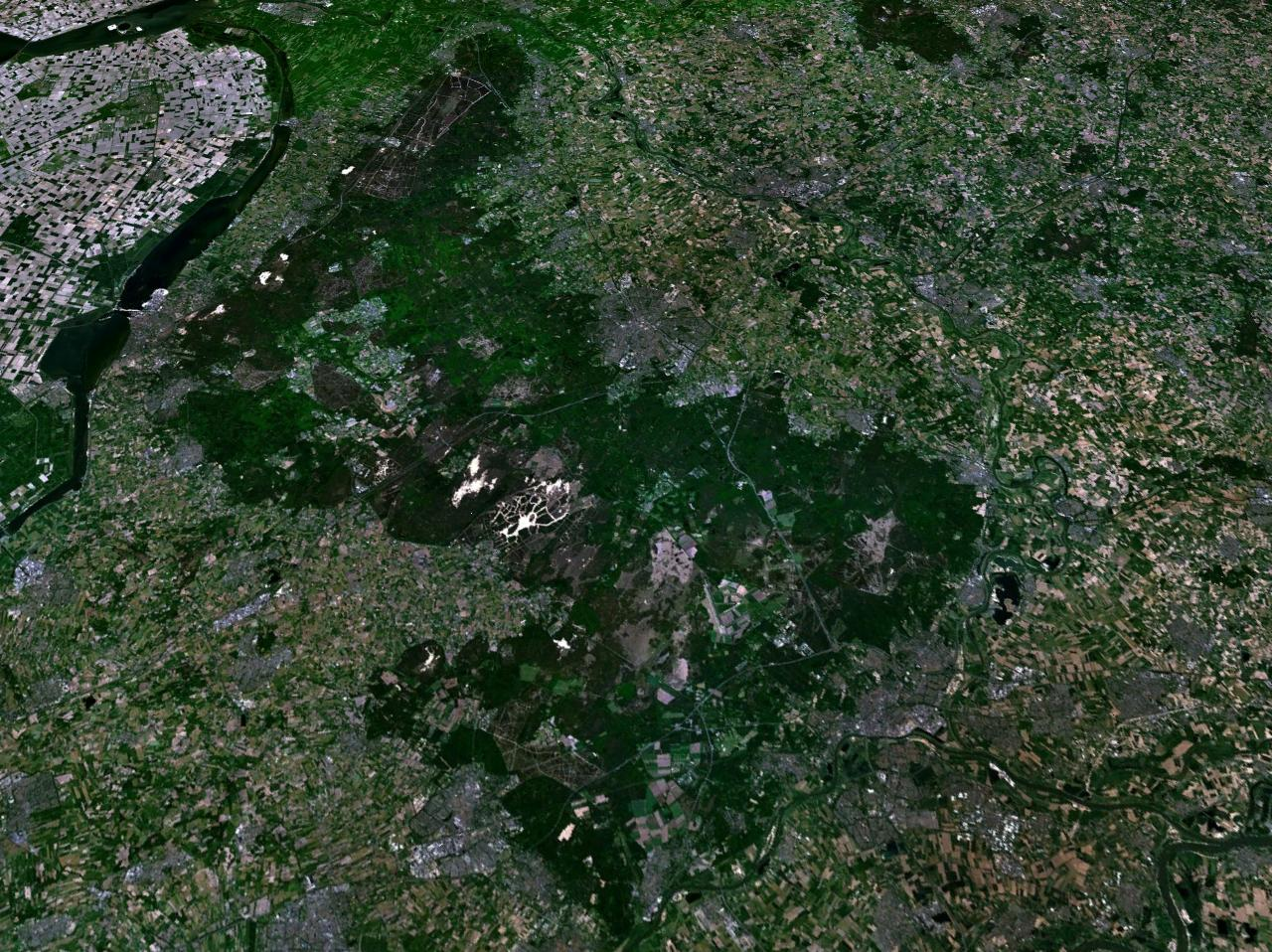
The Veluwe area as seen from space

There are 21 municipalities in the Veluwe region: Apeldoorn, Arnhem, Barneveld, Brummen, Ede, Elburg, Epe, Ermelo, Harderwijk, Hattem, Heerde, Nijkerk, Nunspeet, Oldebroek, Putten, Renkum, Rheden, Rozendaal, Scherpenzeel, Voorst and Wageningen.

The sparsely populated, infertile Veluwe acts as the traditional linguistic boundary between Low Franconian dialects (i.e. essentially Dutch and closely related dialects) to the west and south and Low Saxon dialects further north and east.

== Flora and fauna ==
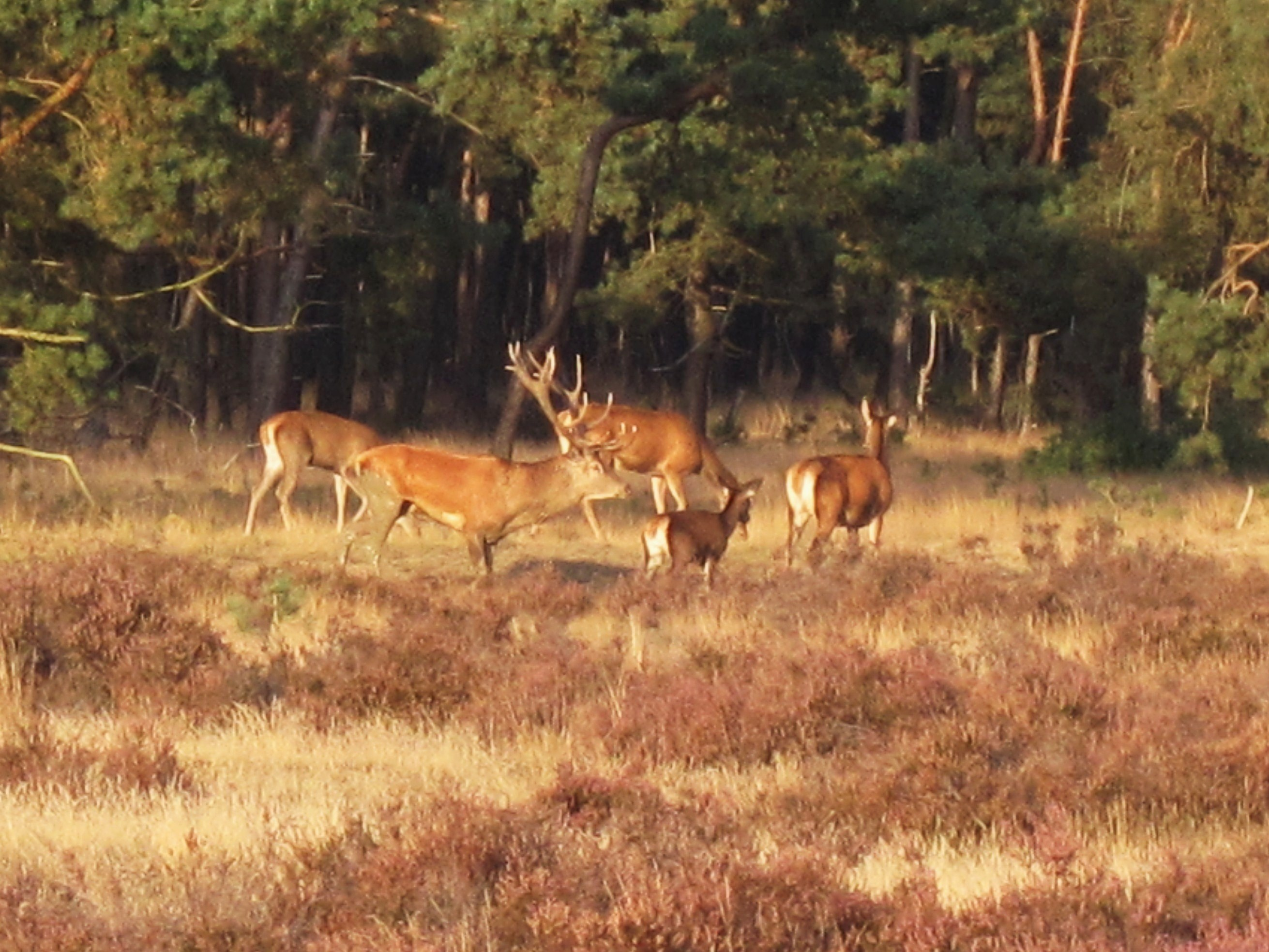
Red deer in the Hoge Veluwe National Park

There are both coniferous and deciduous forests on the Veluwe, and some 500 different plant species can be found. The region is also home to many different species of animals, such as wild boar, several species of deer (like the roe deer, red deer and fallow deer), several species of snakes (including the common viper), pine martens, red foxes, and European badgers. Furthermore, the bird raven was successfully reintroduced, and the introduced Reeves's muntjac and mouflon can sometimes be seen. Furthermore, there live semi-feral and feral cattle and horses like both semi-feral and feral Highland cattle in multiple areas of the Veluwe, semi-feral Sayaguesa cattle and two semi-feral horse breeds: New-forest pony and Icelandic pony. Since 2019 the wolf is officially back with a female and male pair in the northern Veluwe (spring 2019) who had their offspring in the summer of 2019 and one female wolf in middle Veluwe. The prognosis are that many more wolves will reclaim the area. The European bison is also reintroduced as pilot in a fenced area in the Radio Kootwijk Reserve and the golden jackal is reaching the area, from which they are not native, but since the jackals reach the area all by their own they are seen as a welcome and new native species.

== Developments ==
Parts of the Veluwe that have been separated from each other by roads, towns and farmland are being reconnected by returning farmland to nature and creating wildlife crossings over highways. In 2012, nine of these overpasses had been built, each one about 50 metres (160 ft) wide and covered with sand and vegetation to encourage animals to use it. Wildlife corridors connecting the Veluwe to other wildlife areas such as the Oostvaardersplassen in the Netherlands are being developed and further connections to Germany are an option. It is hoped that by doing so the genetic diversity of the wildlife population will increase.

In order to turn the entire Veluwe into one (IUCN Category II) standard national park a number of actions have been taken, or are planned, including: bungalow parks located in a more sensitive natural area have been removed; taking down remaining fences, as around De Hoge Veluwe; an old industrial zone near the village of Renkum was cleared away because it blocked a valley that was important for the migration of wildlife; and a military complex near Nunspeet was removed instead of being redeveloped as a business area.

== Tourism and recreation ==
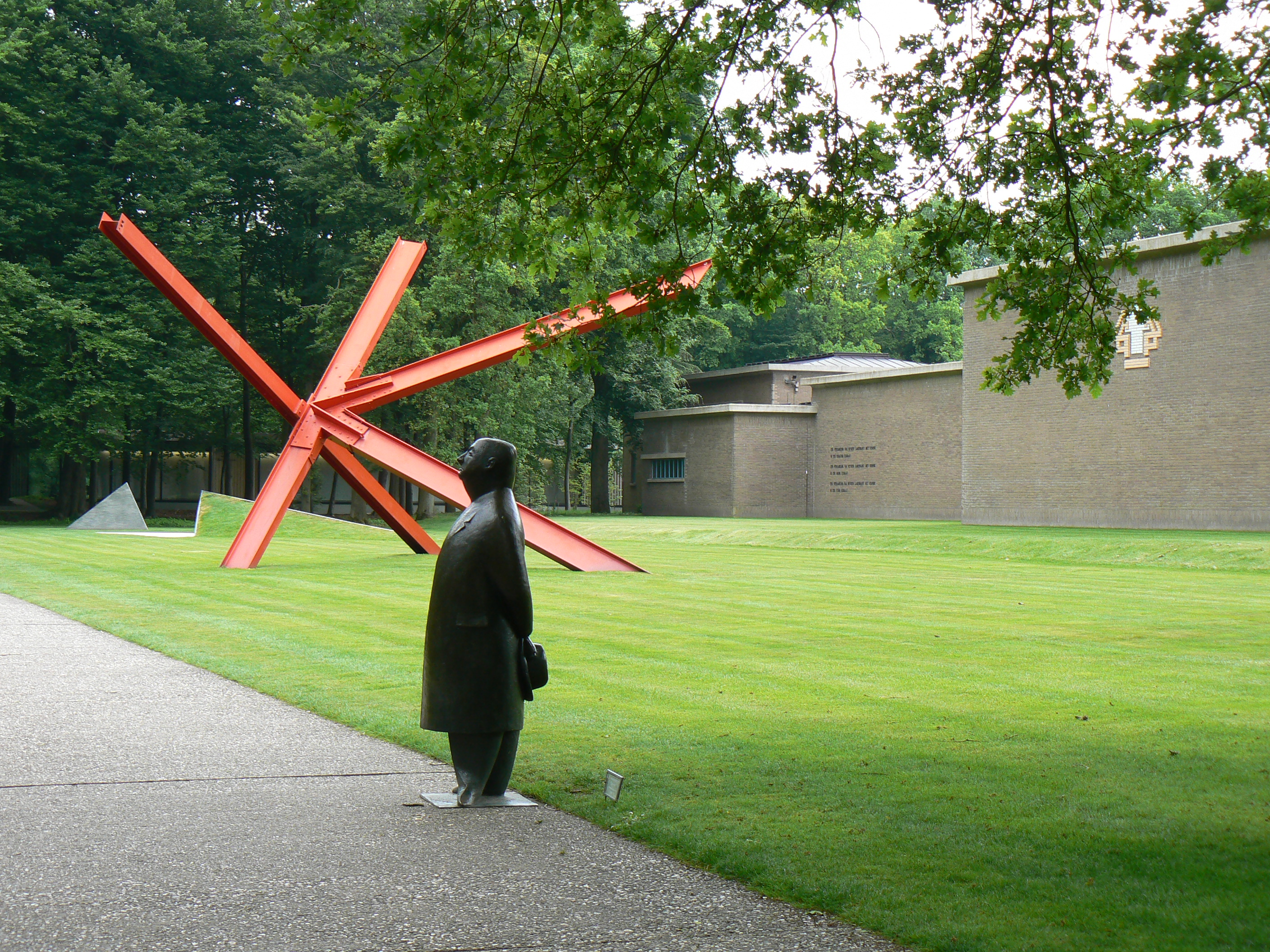
Kröller-Müller Museum in Otterlo

The Veluwe is a tourist destination, especially for Dutch people wanting to go on a short vacation in their own country. Campsites and bungalow parks are the preferred place to stay for most visitors. There are more than 500 of these sites, most located on the outskirts of the natural area.

Tourist attractions in the area include four zoos, over 50 museums including the Kröller-Müller art museum, and the royal palace Het Loo at Apeldoorn. The National Sports Centre Papendal, a large sports complex and Olympic Games training facility, is located in the south of the Veluwe near Arnhem.
