= Helene Kröller-Müller =

German art collector (1869–1939)

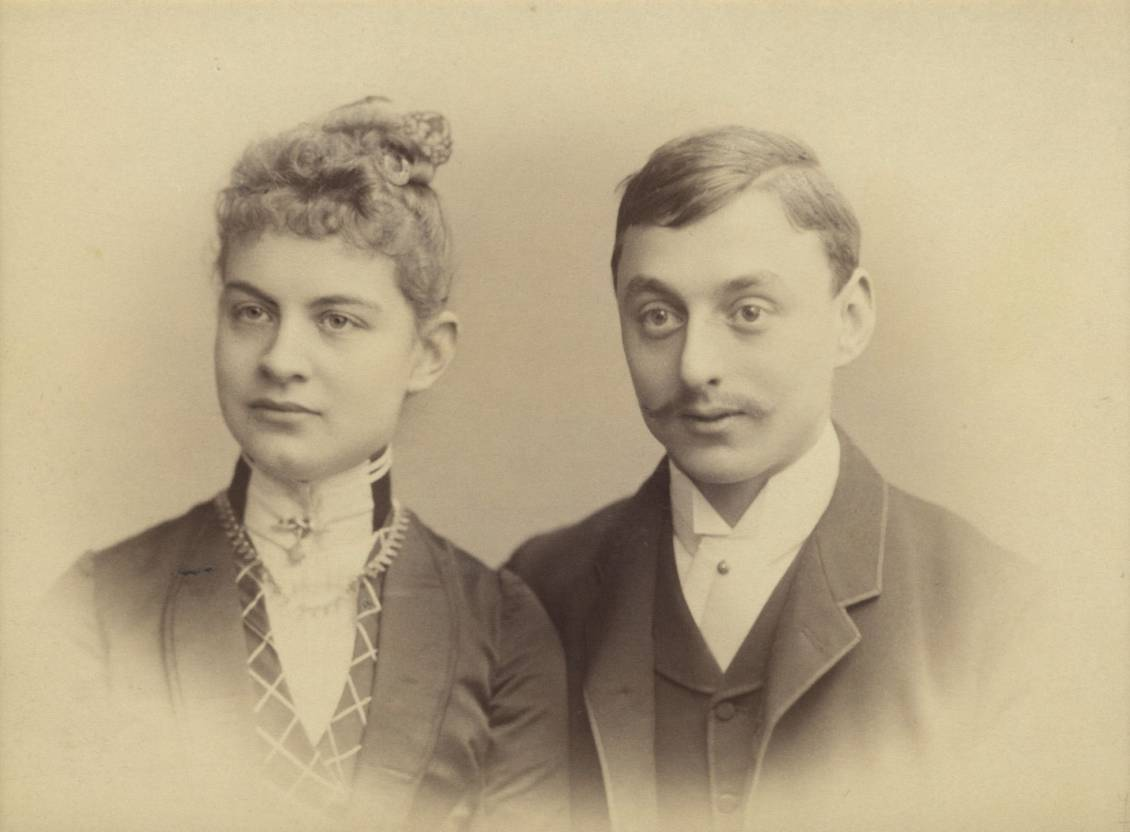
- Helene Müller and Anton Kröller, c. 1888
- Born: Helene Emma Laura Juliane Müller; 11 February 1869; Essen, Prussia, North German Confederation
- Died: 14 December 1939 (aged 70); Otterlo, Netherlands
- Occupations: Art collector and philanthropist
- Spouse: Anton Kröller

Helene Emma Laura Juliane Kröller-Müller (German pronunciation: [heˈleːnə ˈkʁœlɐ ˈmʏlɐ]; née Müller; 11 February 1869 – 14 December 1939) was a German art collector. She was one of the first European women to put together a major art collection. She is credited with being one of the first collectors to recognise the genius of Vincent van Gogh. Her entire collection was eventually sold to the Dutch government, along with her and her husband, Anton Kröller's, large forested country estate. Today it is the Kröller-Müller Museum and sculpture garden and Hoge Veluwe National Park, one of the largest national parks in the Netherlands.

== Life and career ==
Helene Emma Laura Juliane Müller was born in Essen-Horst, Essen, into a wealthy industrialist family. Her father, Wilhelm Müller, owned Wm. H. Müller & Co., a prosperous supplier of raw materials to the mining and steel industries.

She studied under painter Henk Bremmer in 1906–1907. As she was one of the wealthiest women in the Netherlands at the time, Bremmer recommended that she form an art collection. In 1907, she began her collection with the painting Train in a Landscape by Paul Gabriël. Subsequently, Helene Kröller-Müller became an avid art collector, and one of the first people to recognise the genius of Vincent van Gogh. She eventually amassed more than 90 van Gogh paintings and 185 drawings, the world's largest collection of the artist's work at the time, and today the second largest after the subsequently created Van Gogh Museum in Amsterdam. She also bought more than 400 works by Dutch artist Bart van der Leck, but his popularity did not take off like van Gogh's.

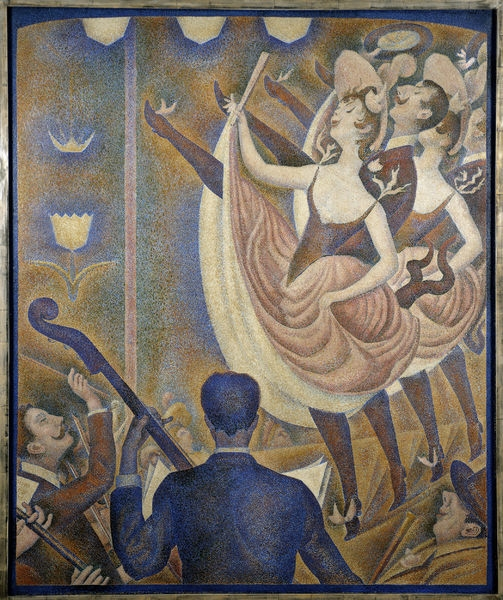
Georges Seurat, 1889–90, Le Chahut, oil on canvas, 171.5 x 140.5 cm (66 7/8 x 54 3/4 in), Kröller-Müller Museum, Otterlo, Netherlands

Kröller-Müller also collected works by modern artists, such as Picasso, Georges Braque, Jean Metzinger, Albert Gleizes, Fernand Léger, Diego Rivera, Juan Gris, Piet Mondrian, Gino Severini, Joseph Csaky, Auguste Herbin, Georges Valmier, María Blanchard, Léopold Survage and Tobeen. However, Bremmer advised her not to buy A Sunday Afternoon on the Island of La Grande Jatte by Georges Seurat, which turned out to be an important icon of 20th-century art. She did purchase however Le Chahut by Seurat, another icon in the history of modern art. Also, she steered away from artists of her native Germany, whose work she found "insufficiently authoritative."

On a trip to Florence in June 1910, she conceived the idea of creating a museum-house. From 1913 onwards parts of her collection were open to the public; until the mid-1930s her exhibition hall in The Hague was one of the very rare places where one could see more than a few works of modern art. In 1928, Anton and Helene created the Kröller-Müller Foundation to protect the collection and the estates. In 1935, they donated to the Dutch people their entire collection totaling approximately 12,000 objects, on condition that a large museum be built in the gardens of her park. Held in the care of the Dutch government, the Kröller-Müller Museum was opened in 1938.

The Kröller-Müller Museum is nestled in their 75-acre (300,000 m^{2}) forested country estate, today the largest national park in the Netherlands, the Hoge Veluwe National Park near the town of Otterlo and the city of Arnhem. A lavish art gallery was planned near their iconic lakeside Jachthuis Sint Hubertus hunting lodge and landscape statue of their close personal friend, the South African Boer General Christian de Wet on the estate. Due to threat of war the plans were never implemented in their lifetime but once the war was over a large forest sculpture garden and understated open exhibition extension was opened, housing statues by Rodin and the second largest collection of van Gogh paintings in the world, including the famous Sunflowers.

From 13 September 2025, to 8 February 2026, the National Gallery, London exhibited Radical Harmony: Helene Kröller-Müller's Neo-Impressionists. The exhibition focused on some of the works she collected, as well as other neo-impressionist works from various public and private collections. It was organized by the Kröller-Müller Museum and the National Gallery. The exhibition catalog was written by Julien Domercq, Christopher Riopelle, and Chiara Di Stefano. ISBN 978-1-857-09737-5
