= Kröller-Müller Museum =

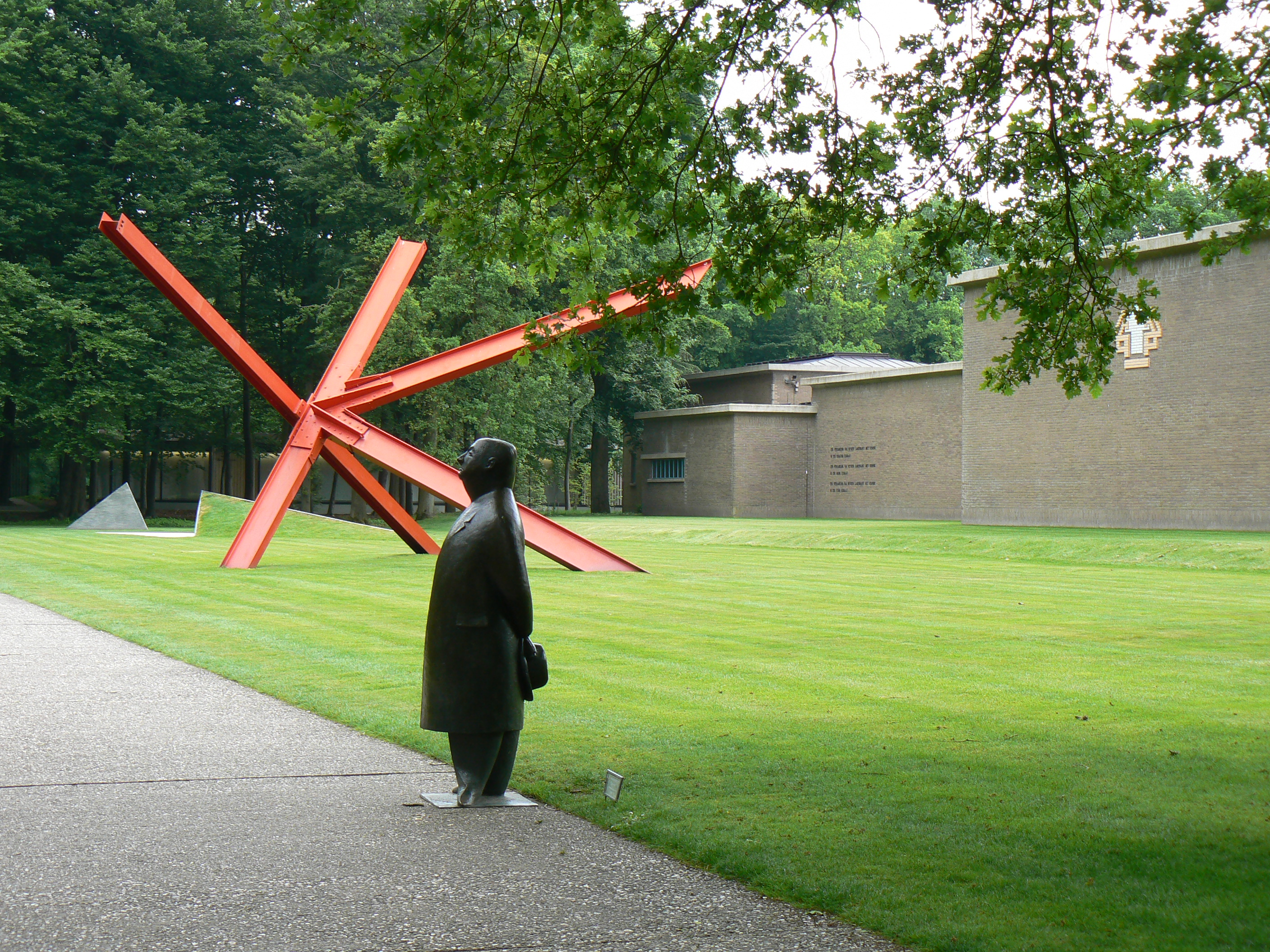
- Entrance of the museum in 2008
- Interactive fullscreen map
- Established: 13 July 1938
- Location: Houtkampweg 6 Otterlo, Netherlands
- Coordinates: 52°05′45″N 5°49′01″E
- Type: Art museum National museum
- Visitors: 283,000 (2025)
- Director: Lisette Pelsers
- Website: krollermuller.nl

The Kröller-Müller Museum (Dutch pronunciation: [ˈkrʏlər ˈmʏlər myˌzeːjʏm]) is a national art museum and sculpture garden, located in the Hoge Veluwe National Park in Otterlo in the Netherlands. The museum, founded by art collector Helene Kröller-Müller within the extensive grounds of her and her husband's former estate (now the national park), opened in 1938. It has the second-largest collection of paintings by Vincent van Gogh, after the Van Gogh Museum. The museum had 283,000 visitors in 2025.

== History ==
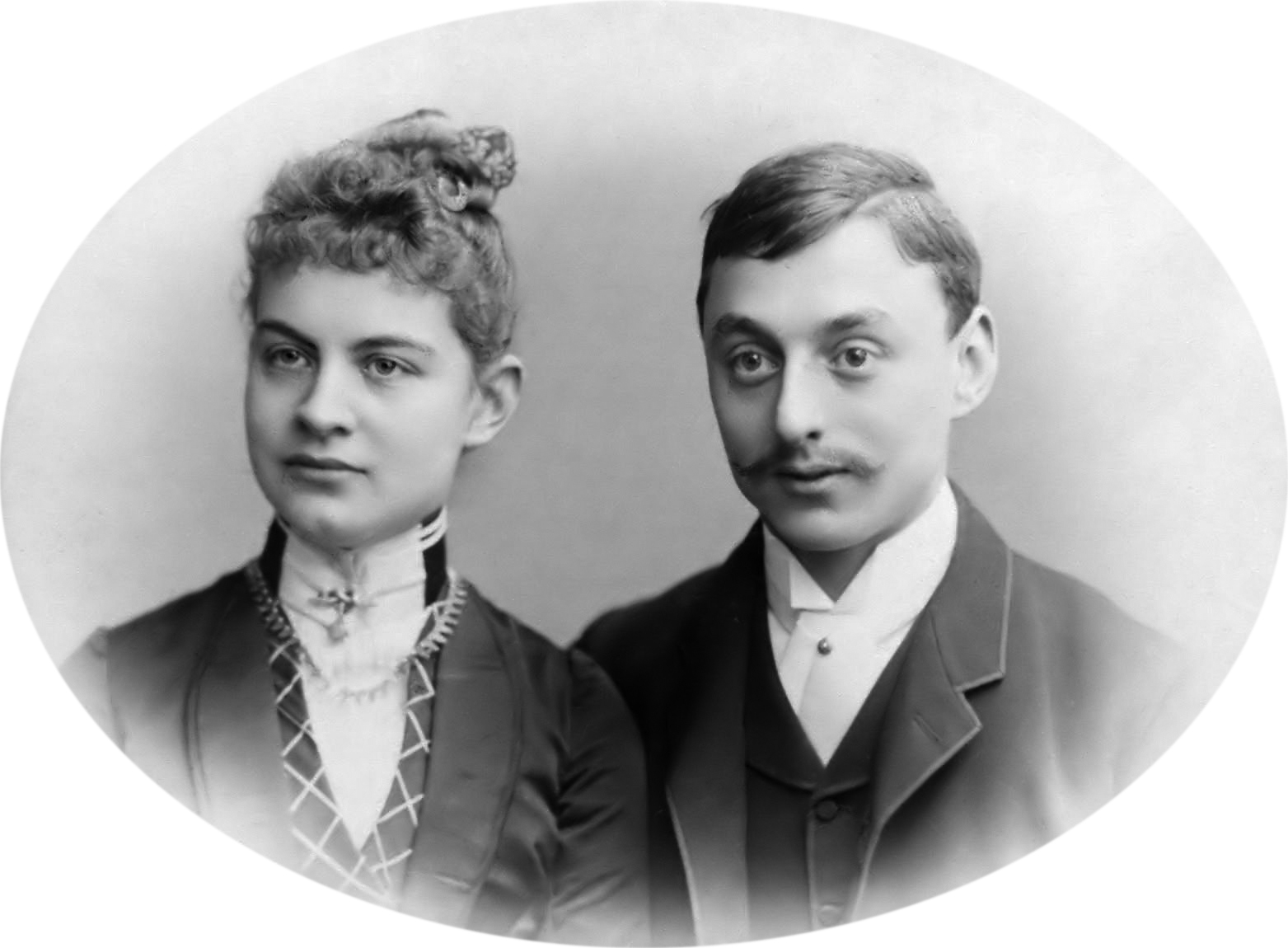
Helene Müller and Anton Kröller, c. 1888

The Kröller-Müller Museum was founded by Helene Kröller-Müller, an avid art collector who, being advised by H.P. Bremmer, was one of the first to recognize Vincent van Gogh's genius and collect his works. In 1935, she donated her whole collection to the state of the Netherlands. In 1938, the museum, which was designed by Henry van de Velde, opened to the public. The sculpture garden was added in 1961 and the new exhibition wing, designed by Wim Quist, opened in 1977.

== Collection ==
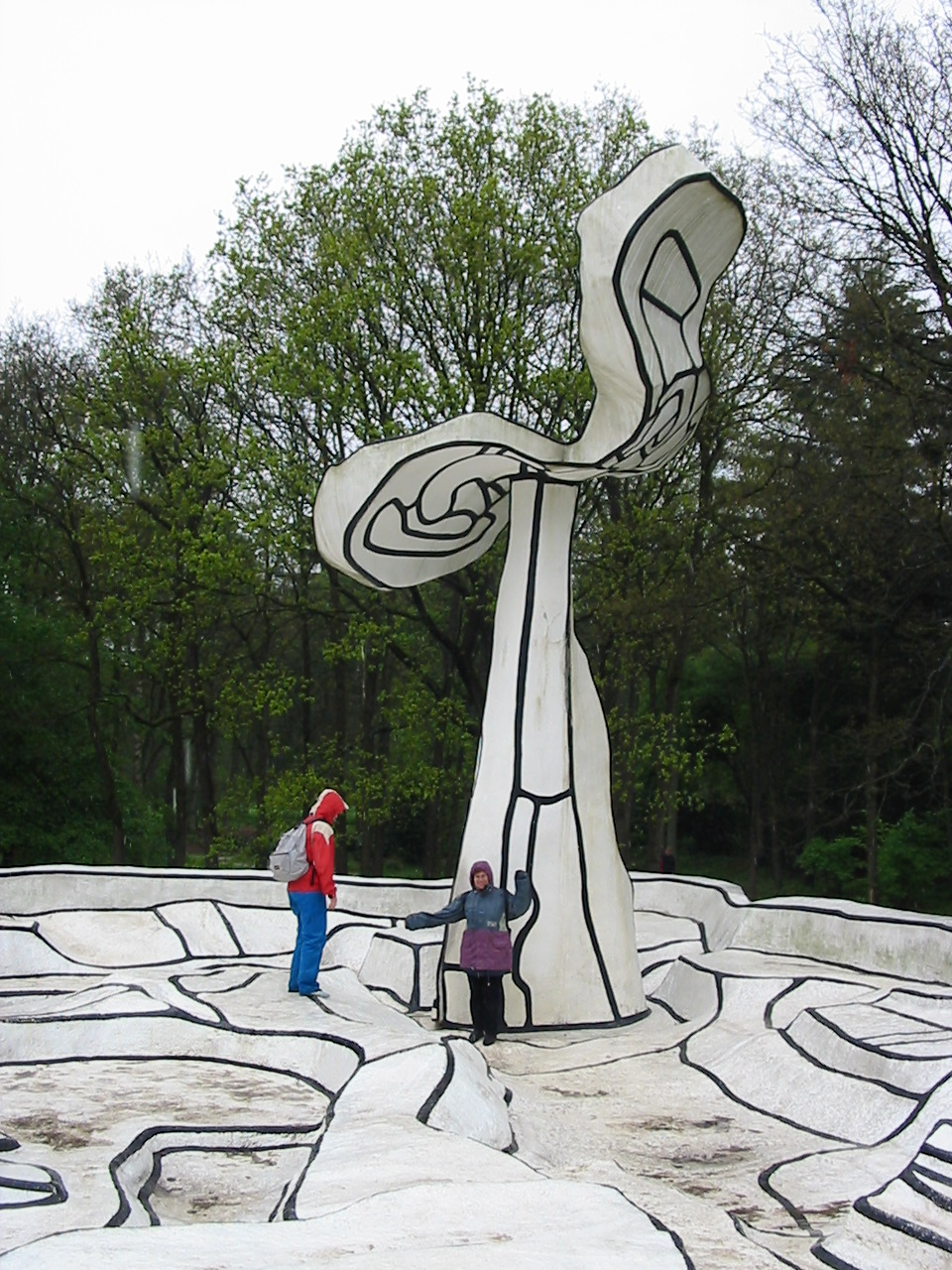
Jardin d'émail by Jean Dubuffet in the Kröller-Müller sculpture garden

The museum has a considerable collection of paintings by Vincent van Gogh—such as Café Terrace at Night, and Sorrowing Old Man (At Eternity's Gate)—making it the second-largest collection of Van Gogh paintings in the world (after the Van Gogh Museum in Amsterdam). Apart from the Van Gogh paintings, other highlights include works by Piet Mondrian, Georges-Pierre Seurat, Odilon Redon, Georges Braque, Paul Gauguin, Lucas Cranach, James Ensor, Juan Gris, William Degouve de Nuncques and Pablo Picasso.

== Sculpture garden ==
The Kröller-Müller Museum is also famous for its large sculpture garden, within the forest park, of more than 75 acres (30 ha) and one of the largest in Europe, with a fine collection of modern and contemporary sculptures. The garden reflects Helene Kröller-Müller's conception of a symbiosis between art, architecture and nature. The collection includes works by Auguste Rodin, Henry Moore, Jean Dubuffet, Mark di Suvero, Lucio Fontana, Claes Oldenburg and Coosje van Bruggen, Fritz Wotruba, Joep van Lieshout and many more.

== Selected collection highlights ==
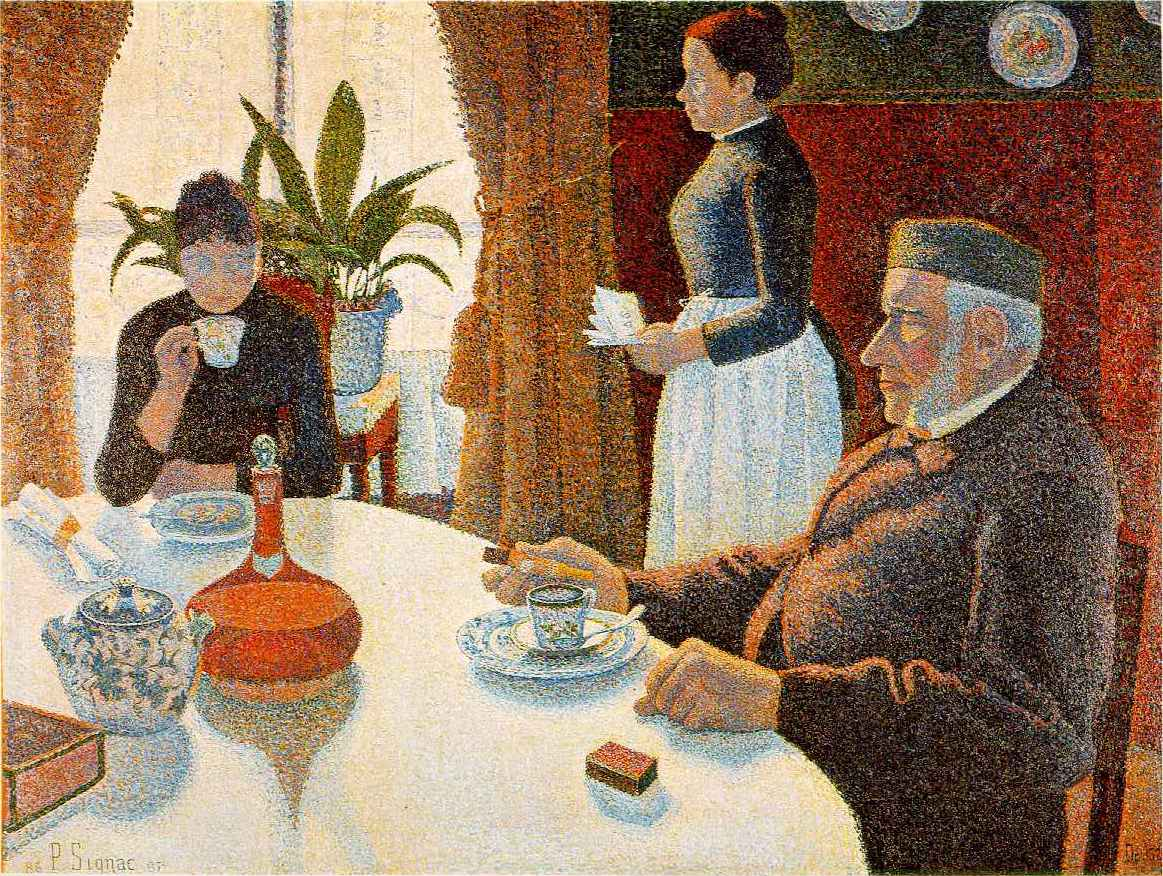
Paul Signac, Breakfast, 1886–87

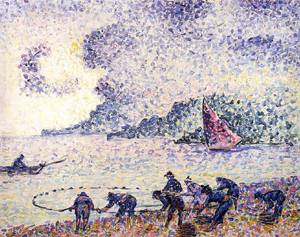
Henri-Edmond Cross, Fisherman, 1895

Jean Metzinger, Coucher de soleil no. 1 (Landscape), 1906

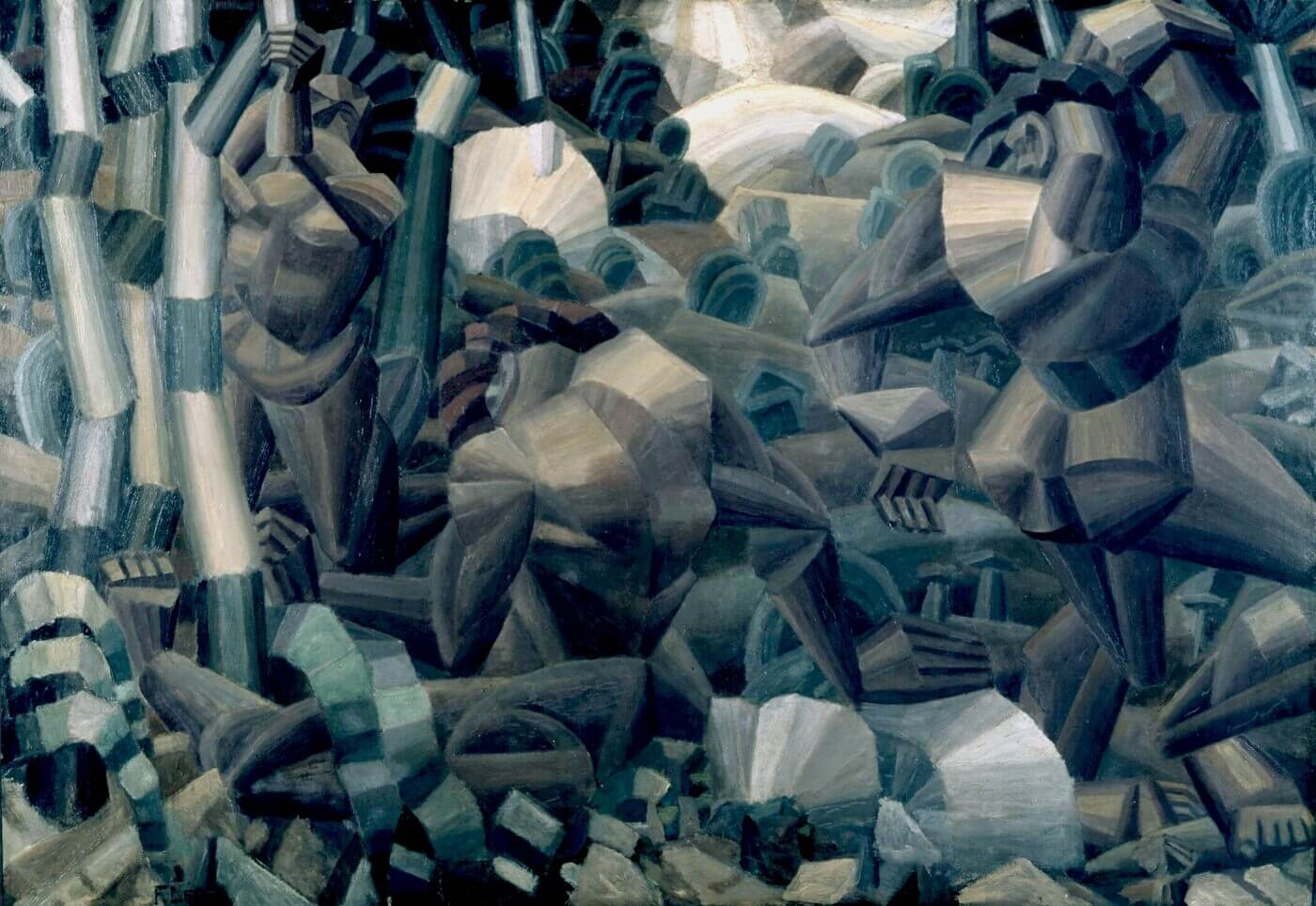
Fernand Léger, Nudes in the forest (Nus dans la forêt), 1910

Georges Braque, Guitare et verre (Guitar and Glass), 1917

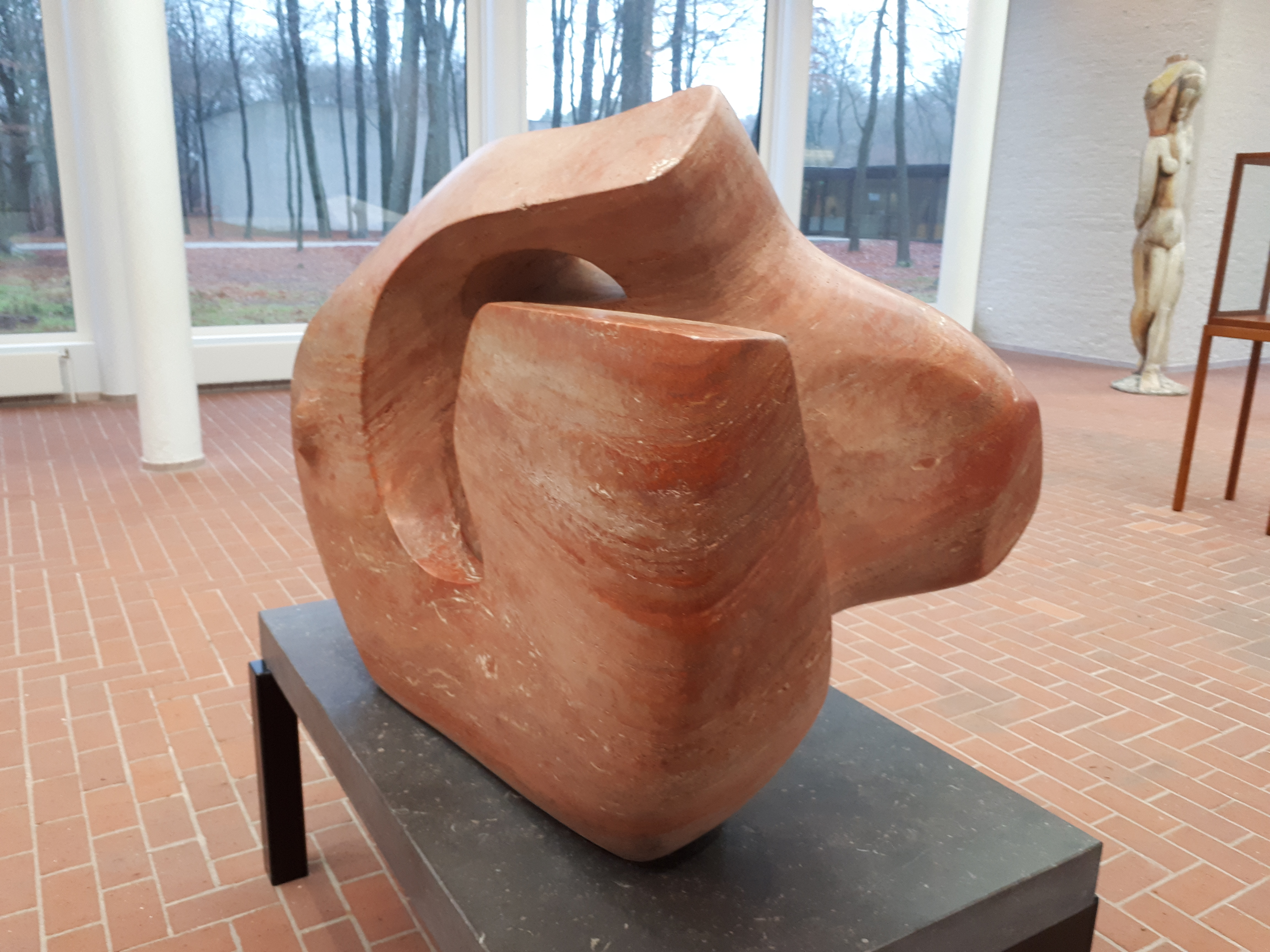
Henry Moore, Sculpture with hole and light, 1967

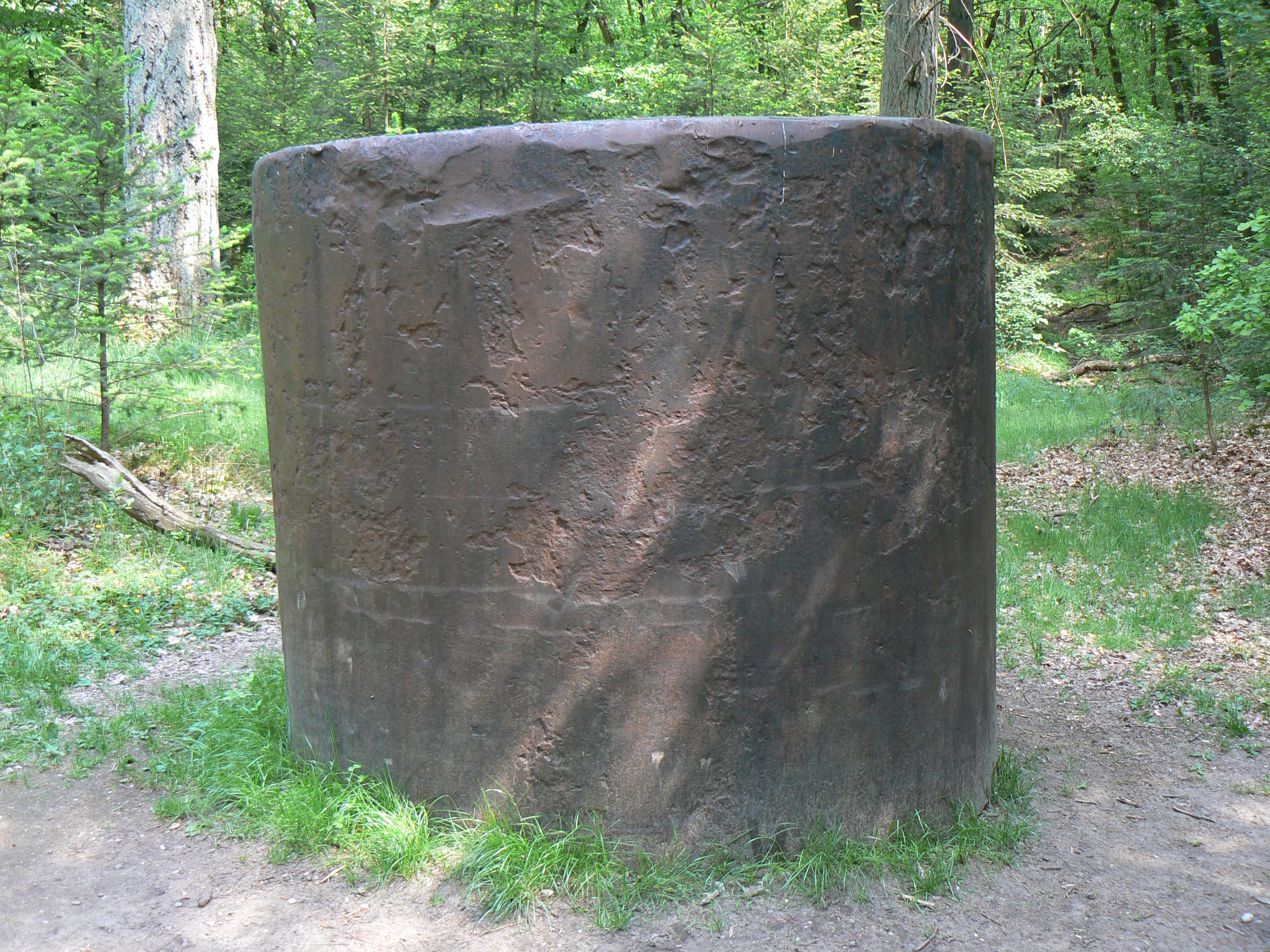
Richard Serra, One, 1988
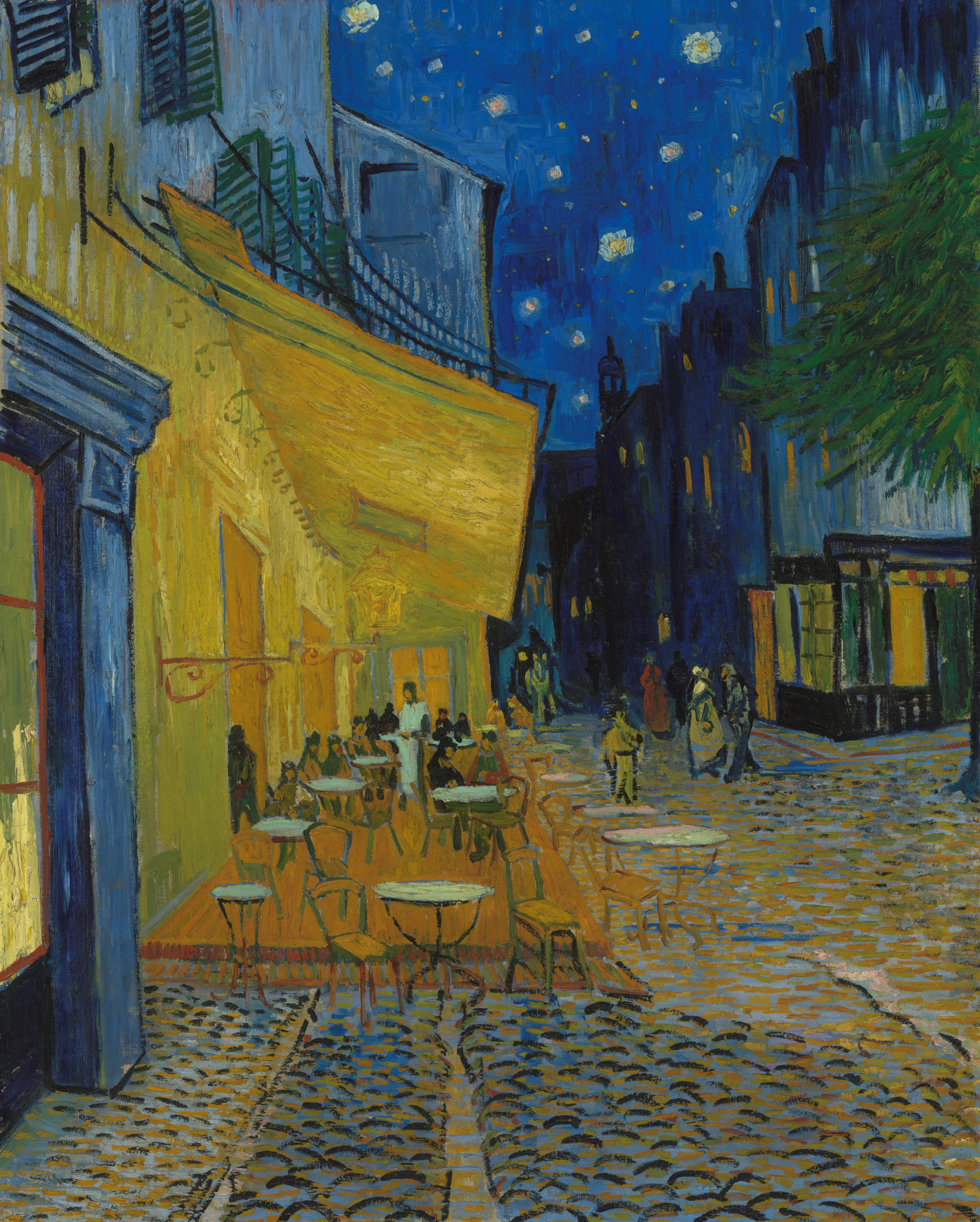
Vincent van Gogh, Café Terrace at Night, 1888

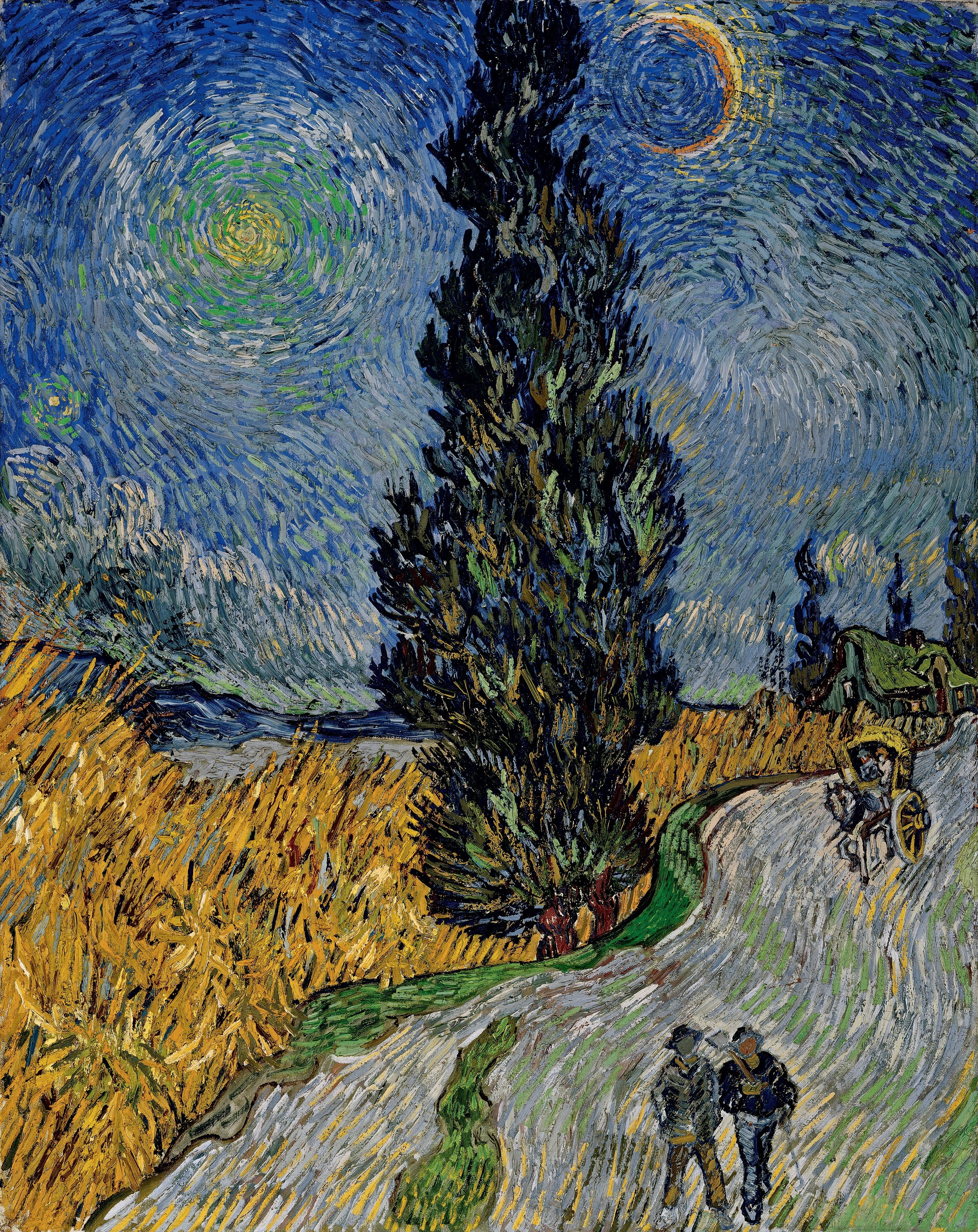
Vincent van Gogh, Country Road in Provence by Night, 1890

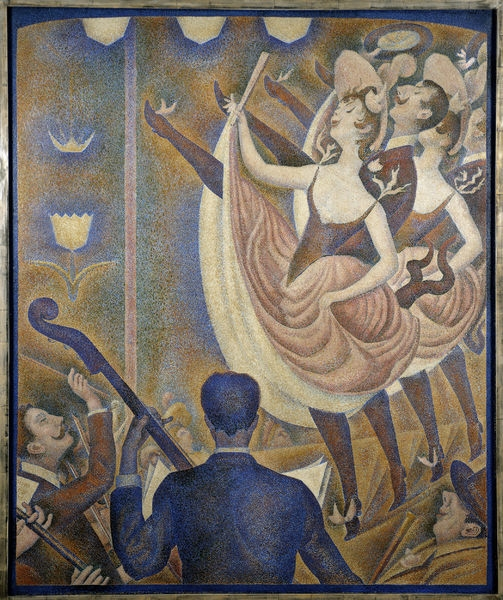
Georges Seurat, Le Chahut (Can Can), 1889–90

Jean Metzinger, La danse (Bacchante), c. 1906

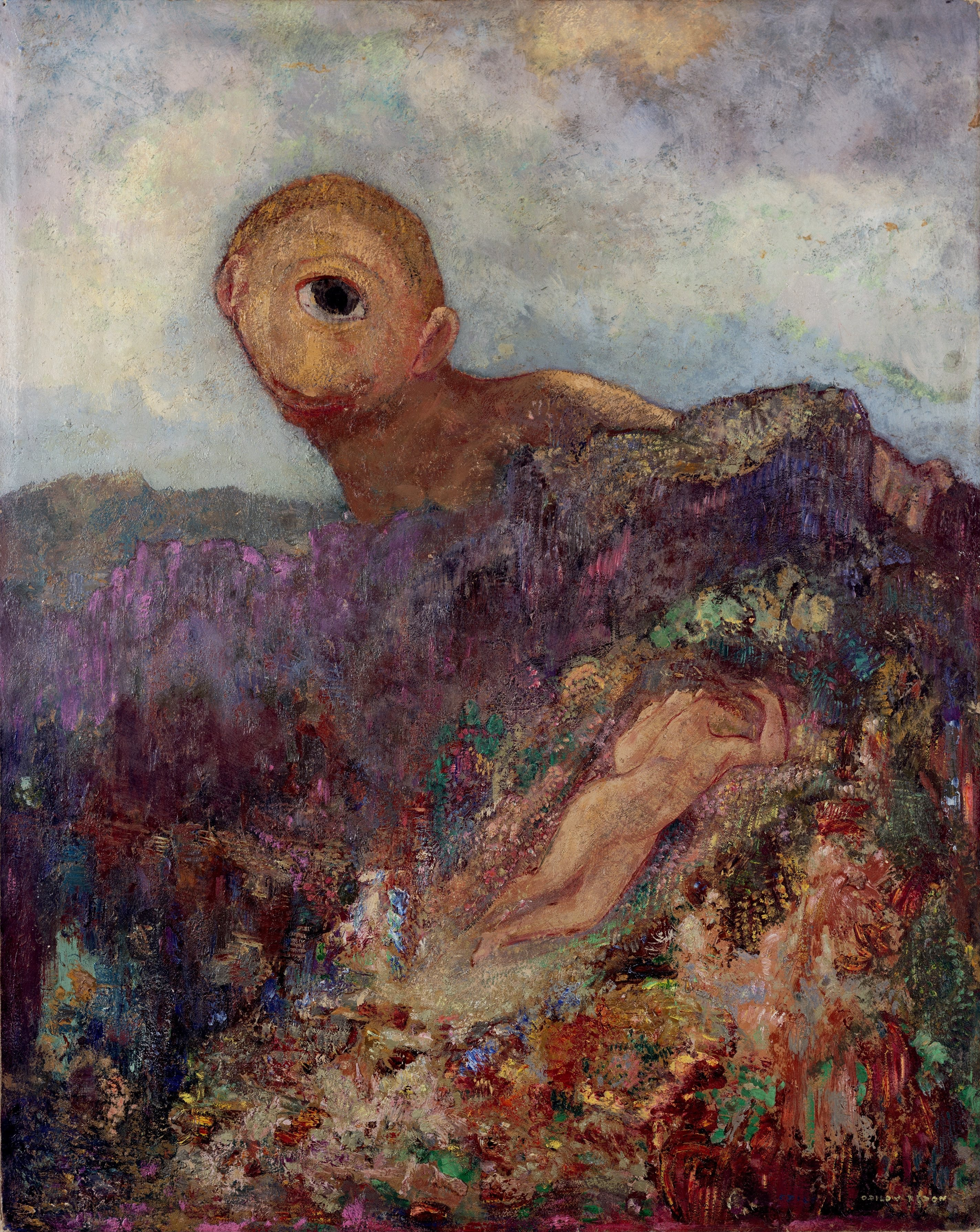
Odilon Redon, The Cyclops, c. 1914

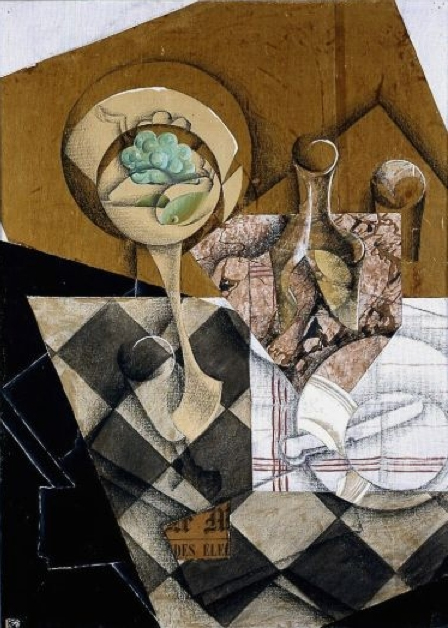
Juan Gris, Le Compotier (The Fruit Bowl), 1914

Pablo Picasso, Violon (Violin), 1911–12

Joseph Csaky, Deux figures, 1920

Joseph Csaky, Tête (Head), 1920

== Administration ==
	Visitors
2012	307,000
2013	330,000
2014	392,000
2015	380,000
2017	Apx. 385,000
2018	Apx. 385,000
2019	405,428
2020	173,000+
2021	127,126
2022	219,691
2023	282,926

Lisette Pelsers was the museum director of the Kröller-Müller Museum from 2012 to 2024. She was succeeded by Benno Tempel.

The museum had an increasing number of visitors until the COVID-19 pandemic, when it took a severe plunge due to closures and reduced tourism activities overall. Visitor numbers have largely recovered since, but have yet to reach pre-pandemic levels.

The museum was the 12th most visited museum nationally in 2013.

== See also ==
- List of museums in the Netherlands
- List of most visited museums in the Netherlands
