= De Hoge Veluwe National Park =

Dutch national park

- Nationaal Park De Hoge Veluwe
- IUCN category II (national park)
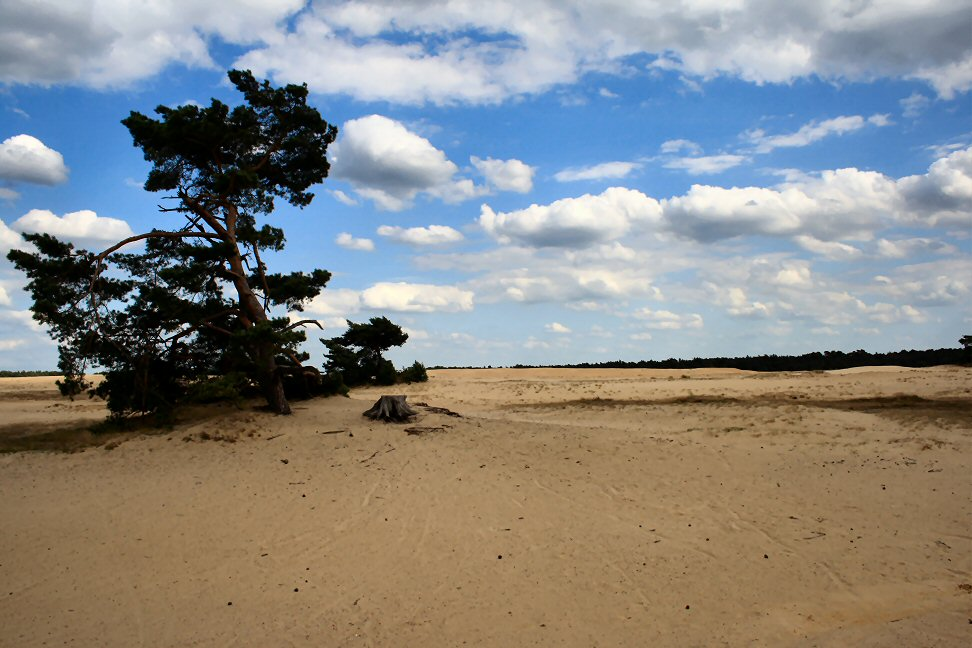
- Location of De Hoge Veluwe
- Location: Gelderland, Netherlands
- Nearest city: Arnhem
- Coordinates: 52°5′N 5°48′E
- Area: 55 km^{2} (21 sq mi)
- Established: 1935
- Governing body: Stichting Het Nationale Park De Hoge Veluwe
- Website: www.hogeveluwe.nl

De Hoge Veluwe National Park (Dutch pronunciation: [də ˈɦoːɣə ˈveːlyʋə]; "The High Veluwe") is a Dutch national park in the province of Gelderland near the cities of Ede, Wageningen, Arnhem and Apeldoorn. It is approximately 55 km^{2} (14,000 acres; 21 sq mi) in area, consisting of heathlands, sand dunes, and woodlands. It is situated in the Veluwe, the area of the largest terminal moraine in the Netherlands. Most of the landscape of the park and the Veluwe was created during the last ice age. The alternating sand dune areas and heathlands may have been caused by human utilization of the surrounding lands. The park forms one of the largest continuous nature reserves in the Netherlands.

== History ==
The park was established by the businessman Anton Kröller and his wife Helene Kröller-Müller as a private estate in 1909. Up until 1923 the park was under construction with wildlife being imported and the building of the hunting lodge and fences. The hunting residence is called St. Hubertus Hunting Lodge after St. Hubertus and was designed by prominent Dutch architect Hendrik Petrus Berlage. Helene Kröller-Müller was an art collector and work had begun on a museum inside the park.

Due to worsening economic conditions the building of the museum was halted and the couple found themselves unable to keep the estate. In 1935 the art collection was donated to the State of the Netherlands, which then continued to build the Kröller-Müller Museum. The park was handed over to a foundation, which received a loan from the State. At that time the estate became the second national park in the Netherlands. The park is still one of the two private owned national parks in the Netherlands, but the only one that asks an entrance fee.

== Layout and contents ==
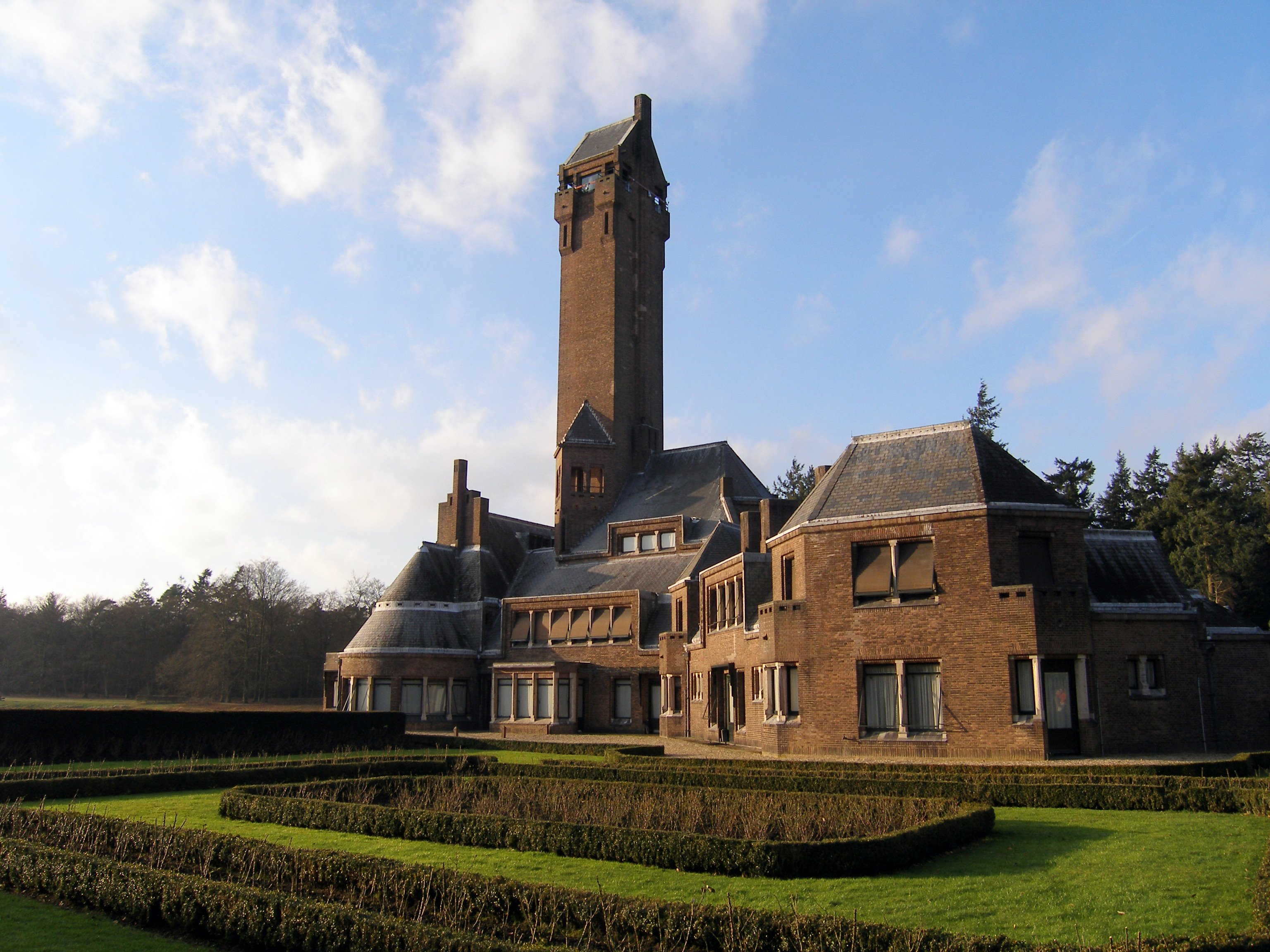
St. Hubertus Hunting Lodge

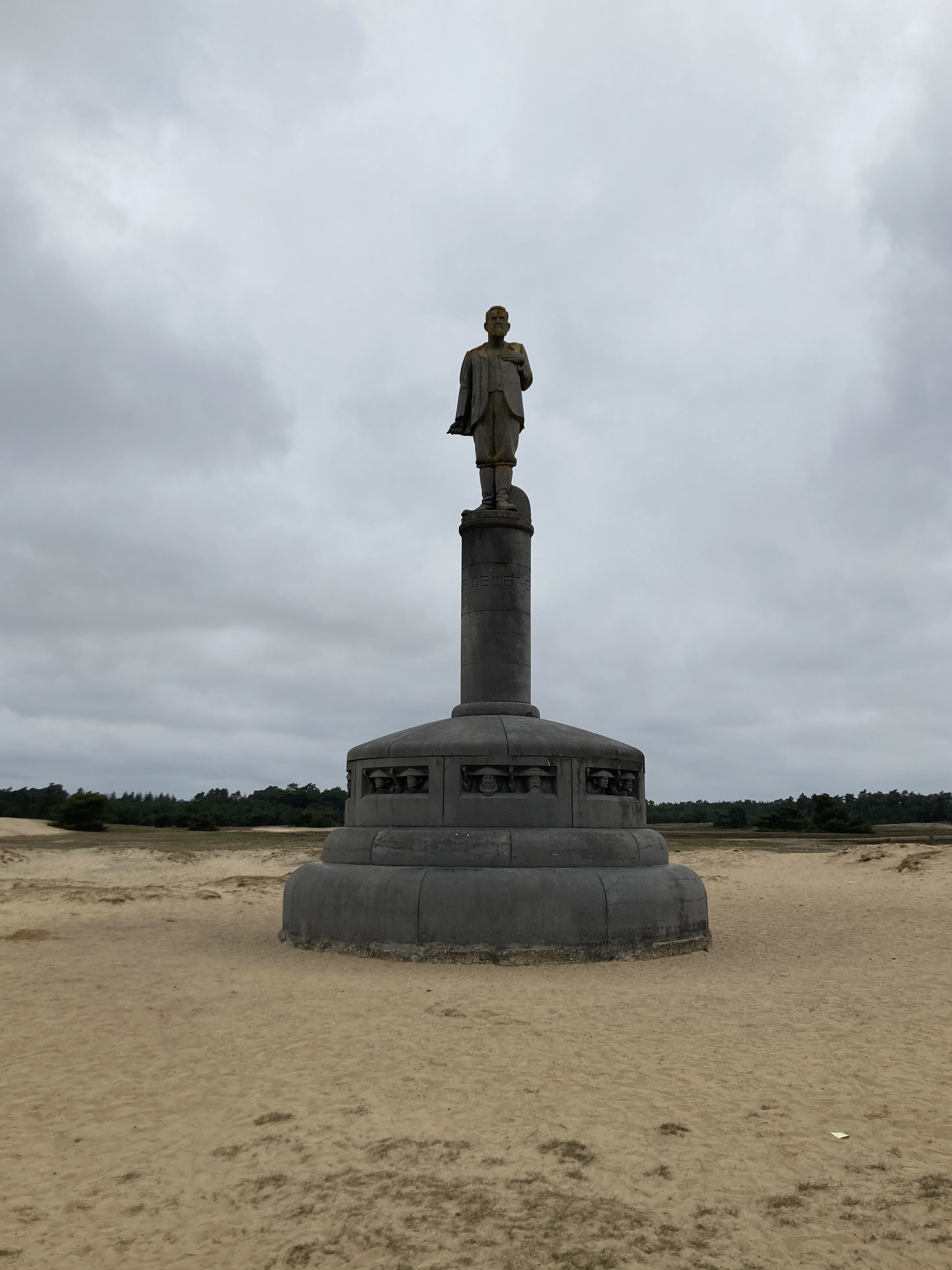
A monument dedicated to Christiaan de Wet, a state president of the Orange Free State, in Hoge Veluwe.

The park is surrounded by fences. These, combined with the required entrance fee, led to years of protests by cyclists and hikers who were forced either to pay the fee or else to follow lengthy detours. In 2007 a solution was reached by charging reduced fees for cyclists who spend only a limited amount of time within the confines of the park. There are three entrances, located at the villages of Otterlo, Hoenderloo and Schaarsbergen.

There are several notable buildings inside the park. The Kröller-Müller Museum houses the art collection of the Kröller-Müller couple and includes numerous important works by artists such as Vincent van Gogh, Pablo Picasso, Odilon Redon, Georges-Pierre Seurat, Auguste Rodin and Piet Mondrian among others. A second museum, Museonder, can be found at the park's visitor centre and focuses on the geology and biology of the Veluwe. Finally there is the aforementioned hunting residence which was designed by Hendrik Petrus Berlage.

A bicycle sharing system in the park makes bicycles available for free to visitors, with much of the area being inaccessible by car.

== Wildlife ==
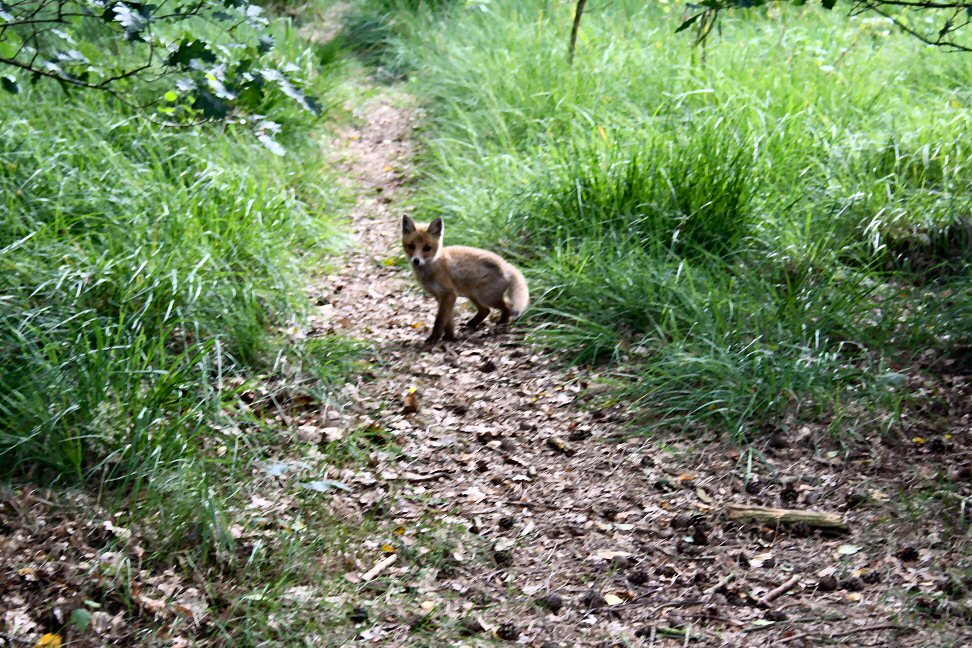
A fox in the park

During spring the wildlife population in the park usually consists roughly of:

- 200 red deer
- 150 roe deer
- 50 wild boar
- A few mouflons
- A small pack of Eurasian wolves

As of 2022, many sources, including park management, state that there are only a few mouflons left due to wolf predation. As mouflon is critical to the conservation of specific biotopes on which other ground species are dependent, action against the wolves may be considered.

Other species found in the park include foxes, badgers, and European pine martens.

== Miscellaneous ==
A Boeing 777-300ER of KLM carries the name Nationaal Park De Hoge Veluwe.
