= Otterlo =

- Village
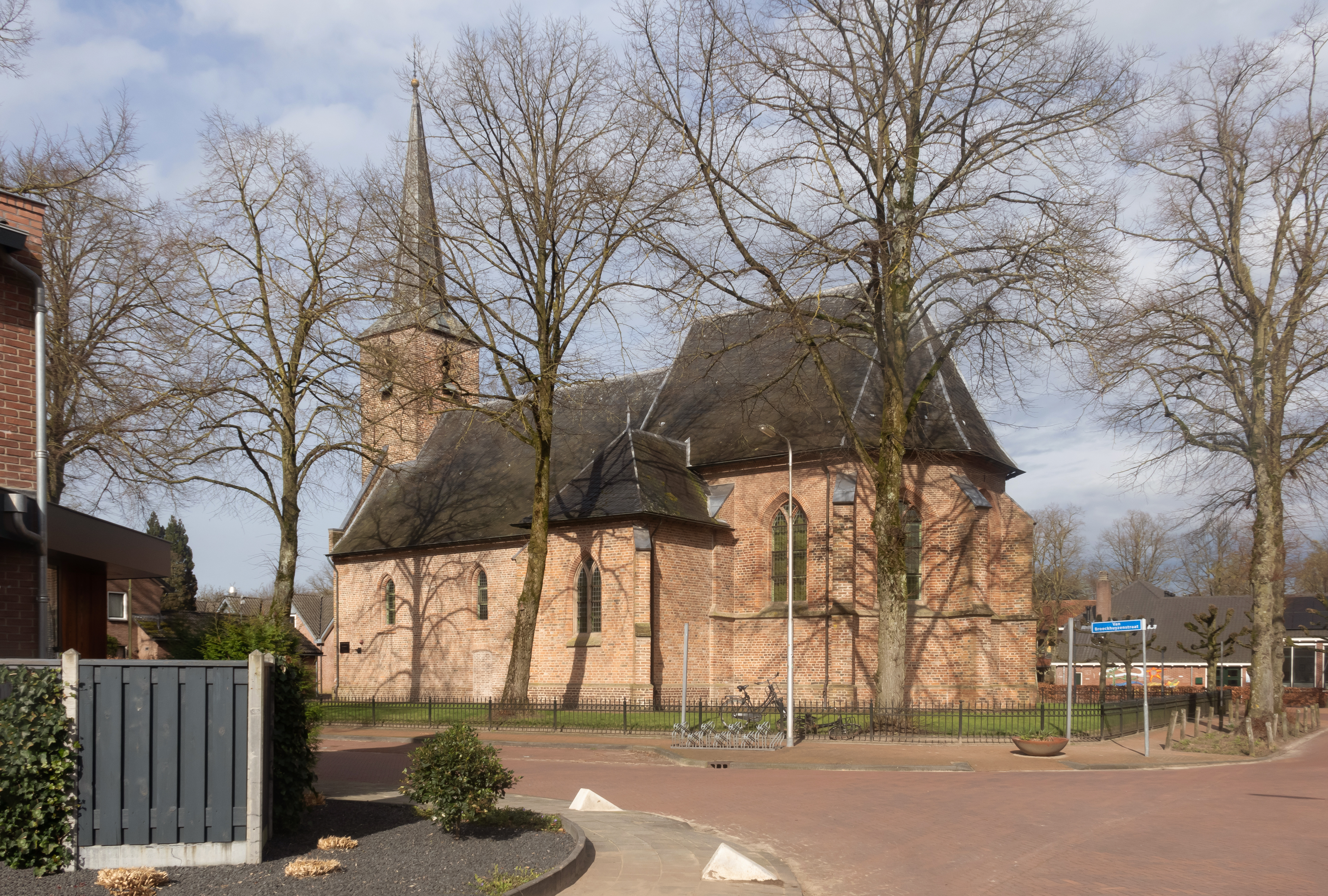
- Otterlo Reformed Church

- Location in the Netherlands Otterlo (Netherlands)
- Coordinates: 52°6′1″N 5°46′21″E
- Country: Netherlands
- Province: Gelderland
- Municipality: Ede

Area
  - Total: 103.90 km^{2} (40.12 sq mi)
- Elevation: 28 m (92 ft)

Population (2021)
  - Total: 2,310
  - Density: 22.2/km^{2} (57.6/sq mi)
- Time zone: UTC+1 (CET)
  - Summer (DST): UTC+2 (CEST)
- Postal code: 6731
- Dialing code: 0318
- Website: otterlo.nl

Otterlo is a village in the municipality of Ede of province of Gelderland in the Netherlands, in or near the Nationaal Park De Hoge Veluwe.

The Kröller-Müller Museum, named after Helene Kröller-Müller, is situated nearby and has the world's second largest collection of Vincent van Gogh paintings.

Otterlo was a separate municipality until 1818, when it merged with Ede.

== History ==
=== Second World War ===
During the first four years of the war, Otterlo was relatively unharmed. The local resistance made use of a secret telephone connection from an electrician's house, which in 2021 still stands at the dorpsstraat, behind barber Prophitius, to communicate with the allies below the river Rhine (1944/1945). During the war, multiple families hid Jewish people from the Germans. One location was betrayed however, resulting in a raid in 1944 at the house 'De Lindenhof' at the Hoenderlooseweg.

During the liberation of Netherlands in April 1945, Otterlo was the center of a fierce and bloody battle between German and British and Canadian soldiers. See the Battle of Otterlo.
