= List of outdoor sculptures in the Netherlands =

Outdoor sculptures in the Netherlands

- Curved Form (Bryher) is a bronze sculpture by Barbara Hepworth, modeled in 1961.
- De Schreeuw 2007, a sculpture honoring Theo van Gogh (The Scream)
- Elegy III (Hepworth) is an abstract bronze sculpture, by Barbara Hepworth
- Exposure (sculpture) by artist Antony Gormley
- Jardin d'émail by Jean Dubuffet, sculpture garden at Museum Kröller Müller
- Figure découpée l’Oiseau (1963) Vondelpark NL
- Johnny Jordaanplein The square was named for a popular musician in the mid-1900s: Johnny Jordaan. There are bronze sculptures of Jordaan musical hall of fame. A statue of Johnny Jordaan was unveiled in 1991. There are sculptures of other performers: Tante Leen, Johnny Meyer, Manke Nelis and Jan & Mien in the square.
- The Blue Violin Player In 1982 the sculpture of a human figure running with a violin case was installed in Amsterdam. The Blue Violin Player appears to be rushing toward the Bloemgracht tram stop, while carrying a violin case.
- Statue of Anne Frank (Westermarkt)
- Torentje van Drienerlo is a 1979 artwork by Dutch artist Wim T. Schippers, located on the campus of the University of Twente in Enschede

== Gallery ==
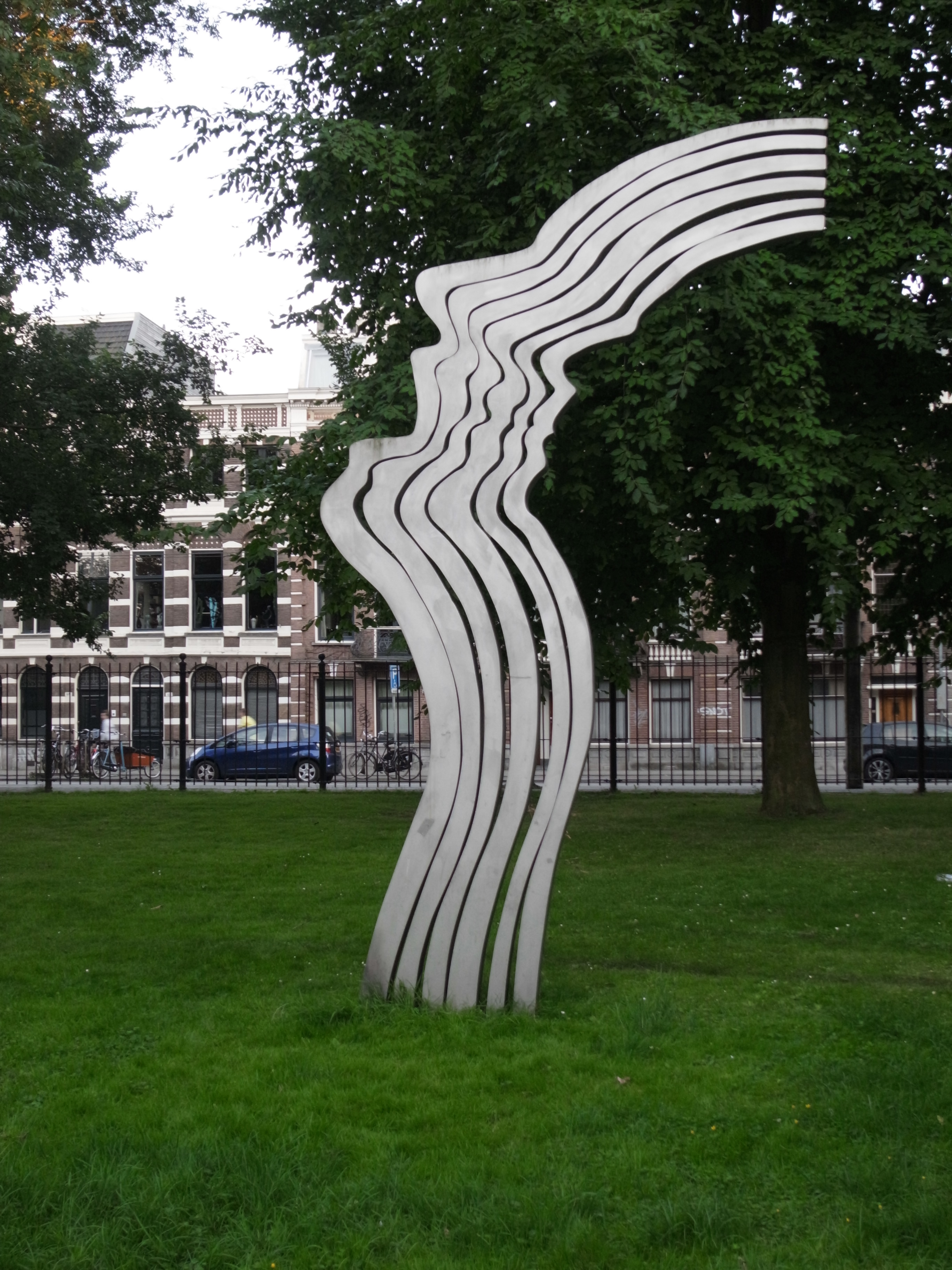
The Scream

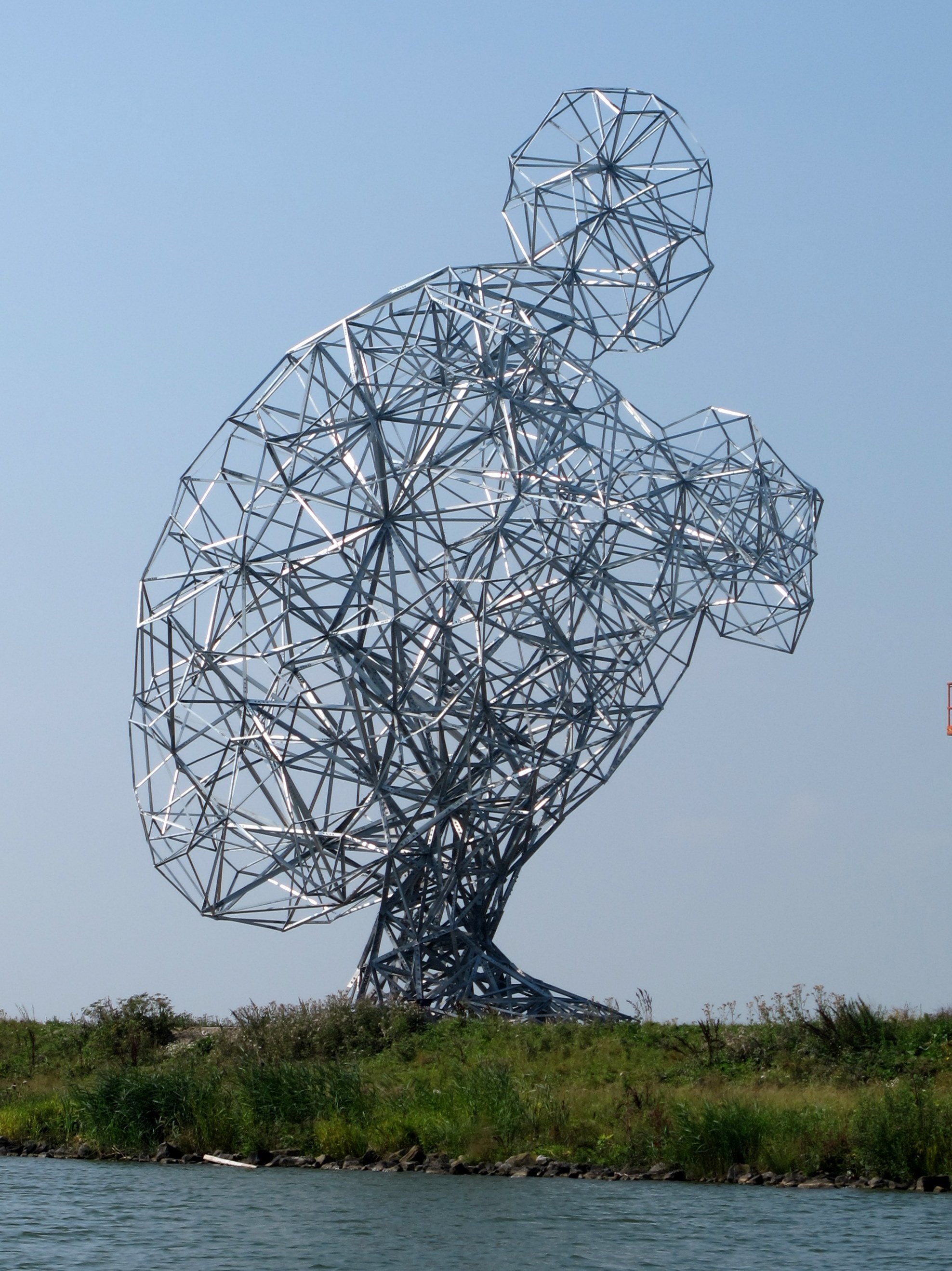
Exposure by Antony Gormley

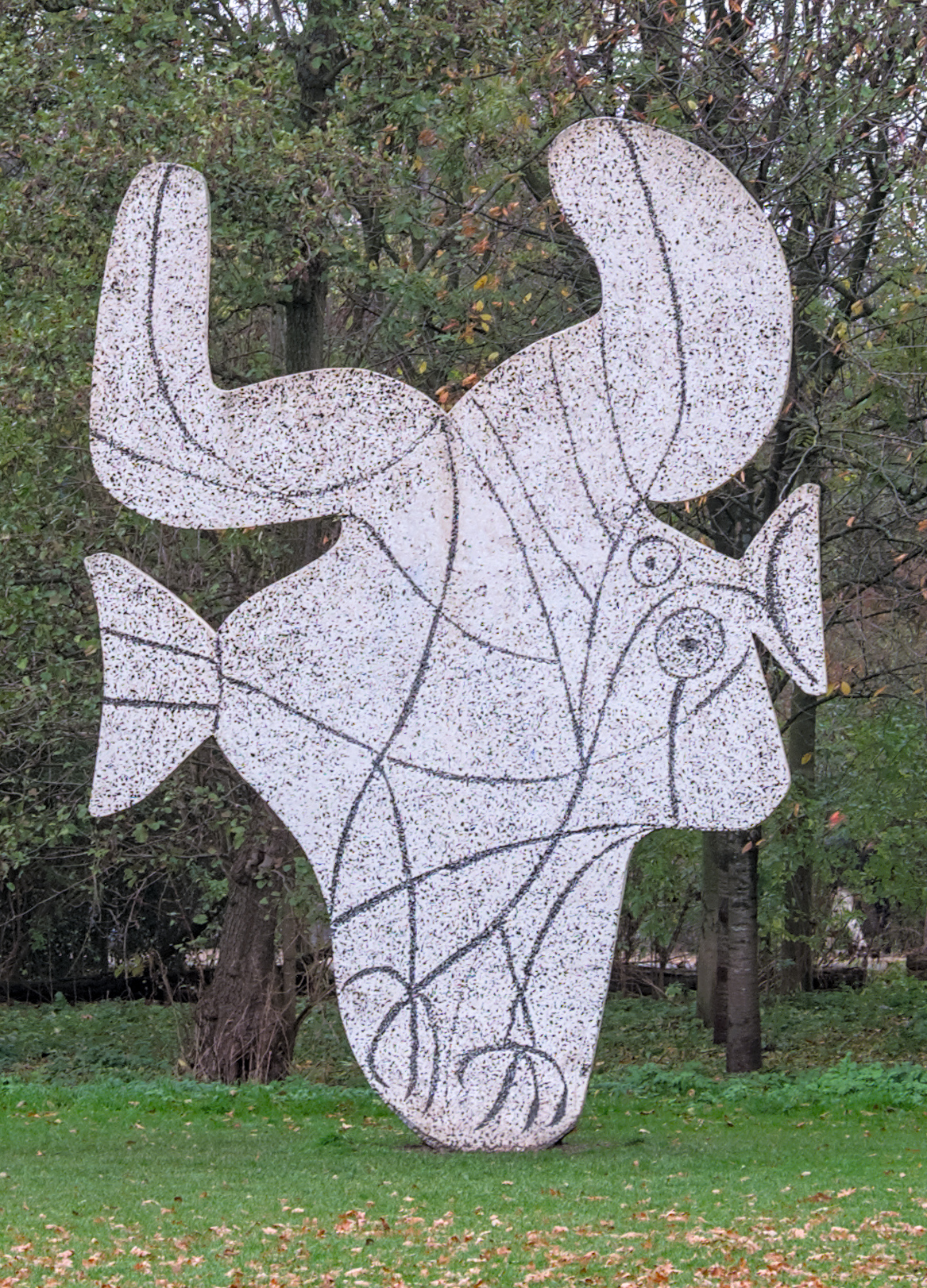
Figure découpée

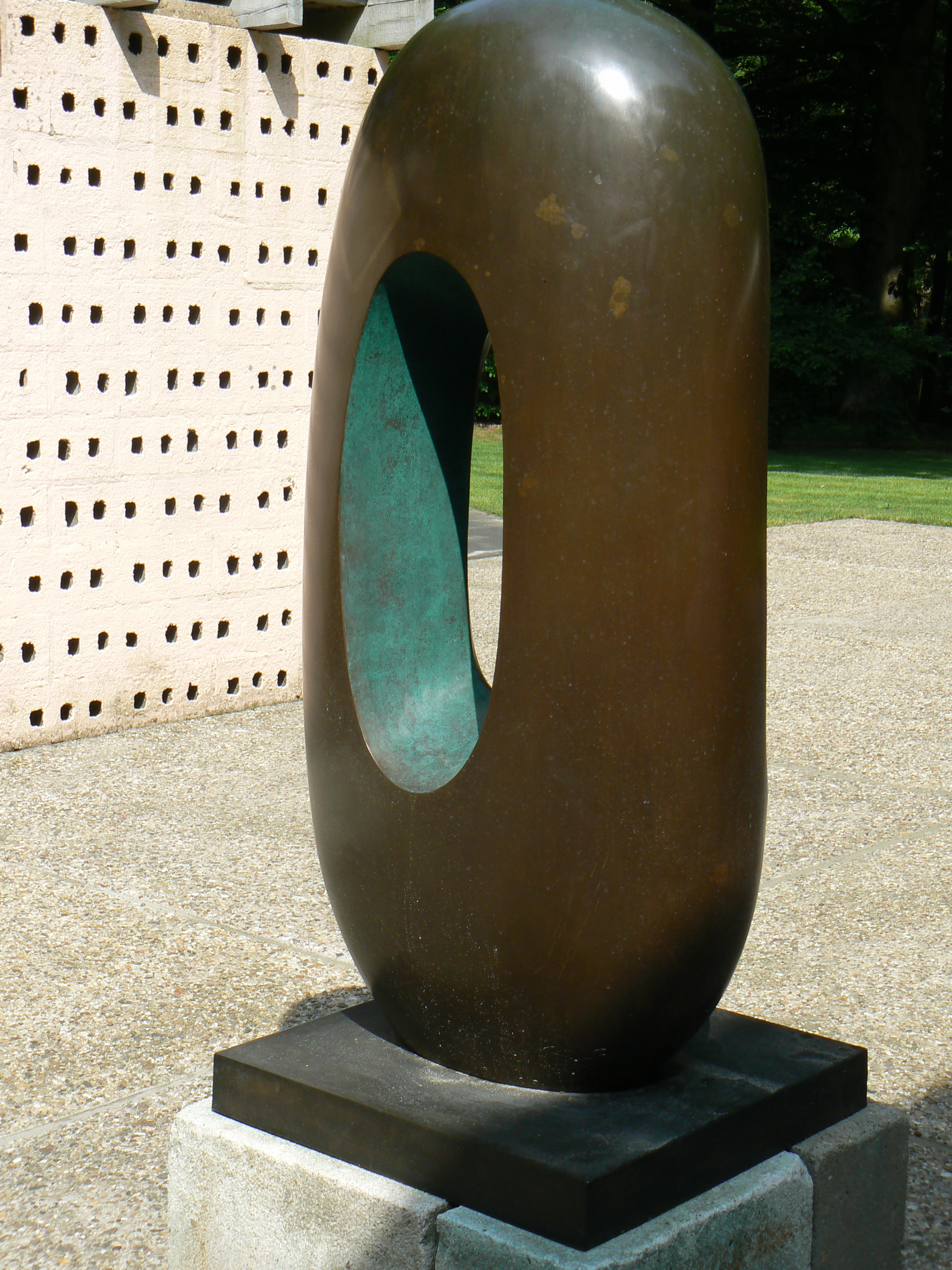
KMM Hepworth Elegy III

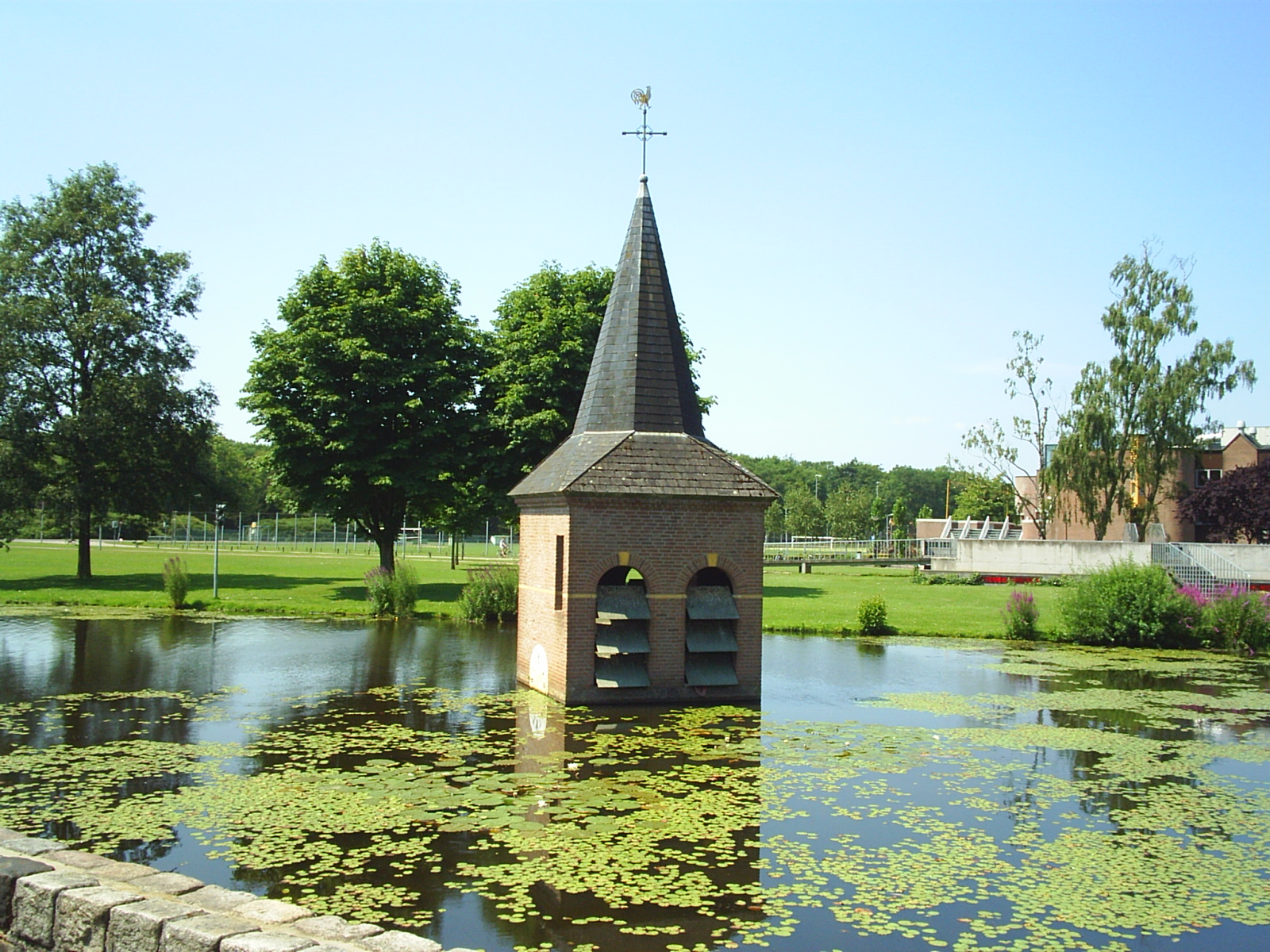
Torentje van Drienerlo

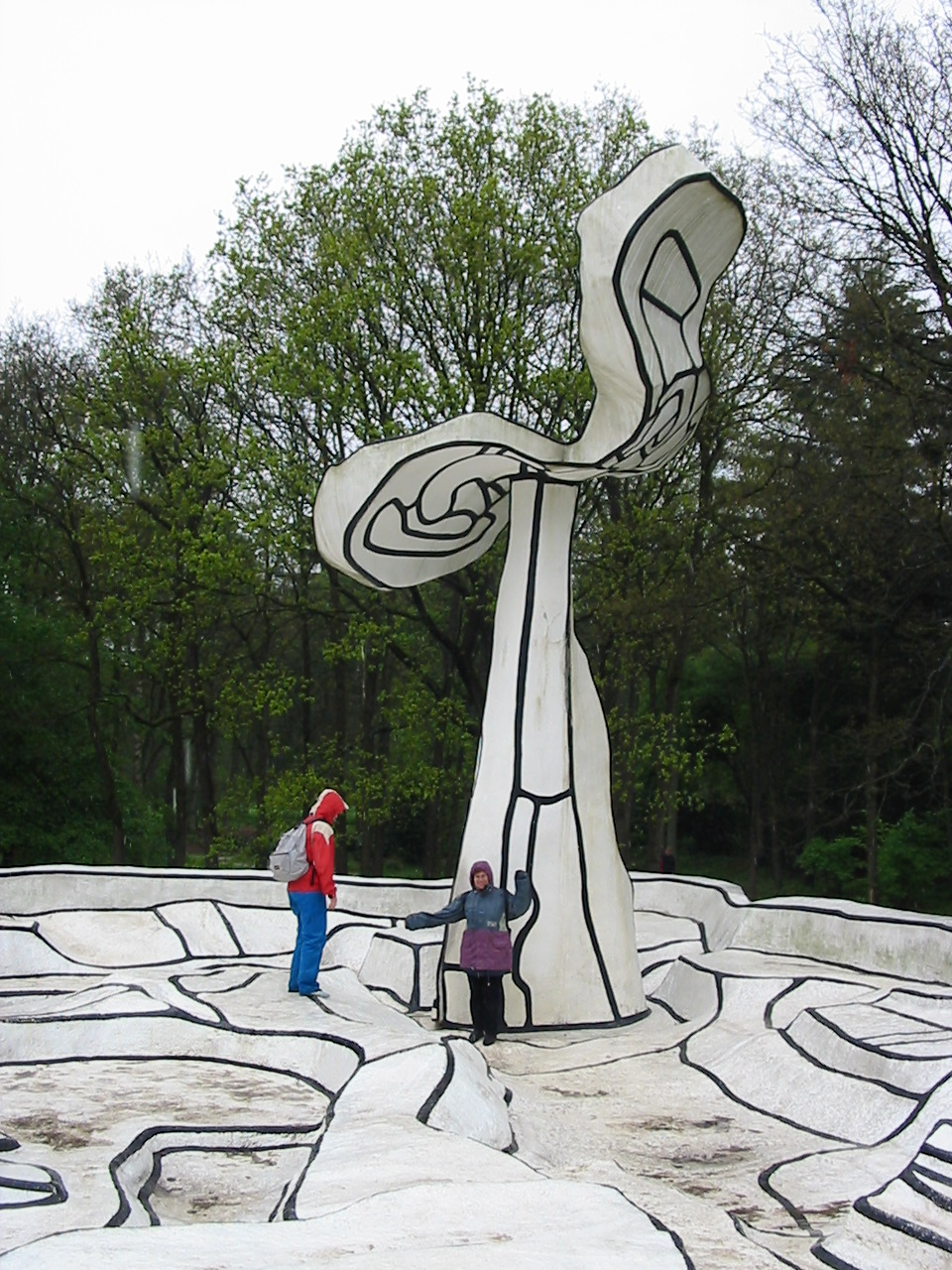
Jardin d'émail Dubuffet

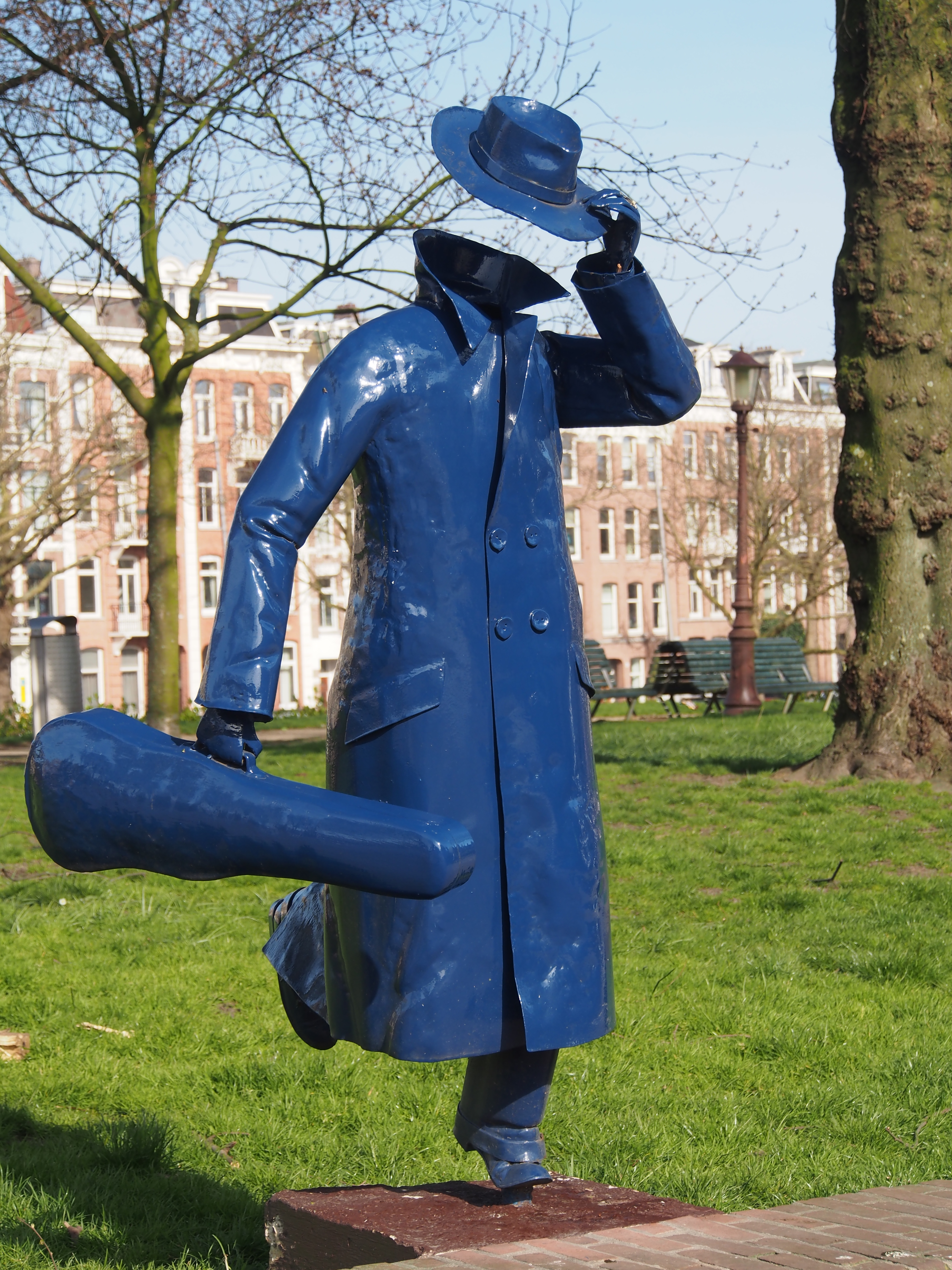
De Blauwe Vioolspeler

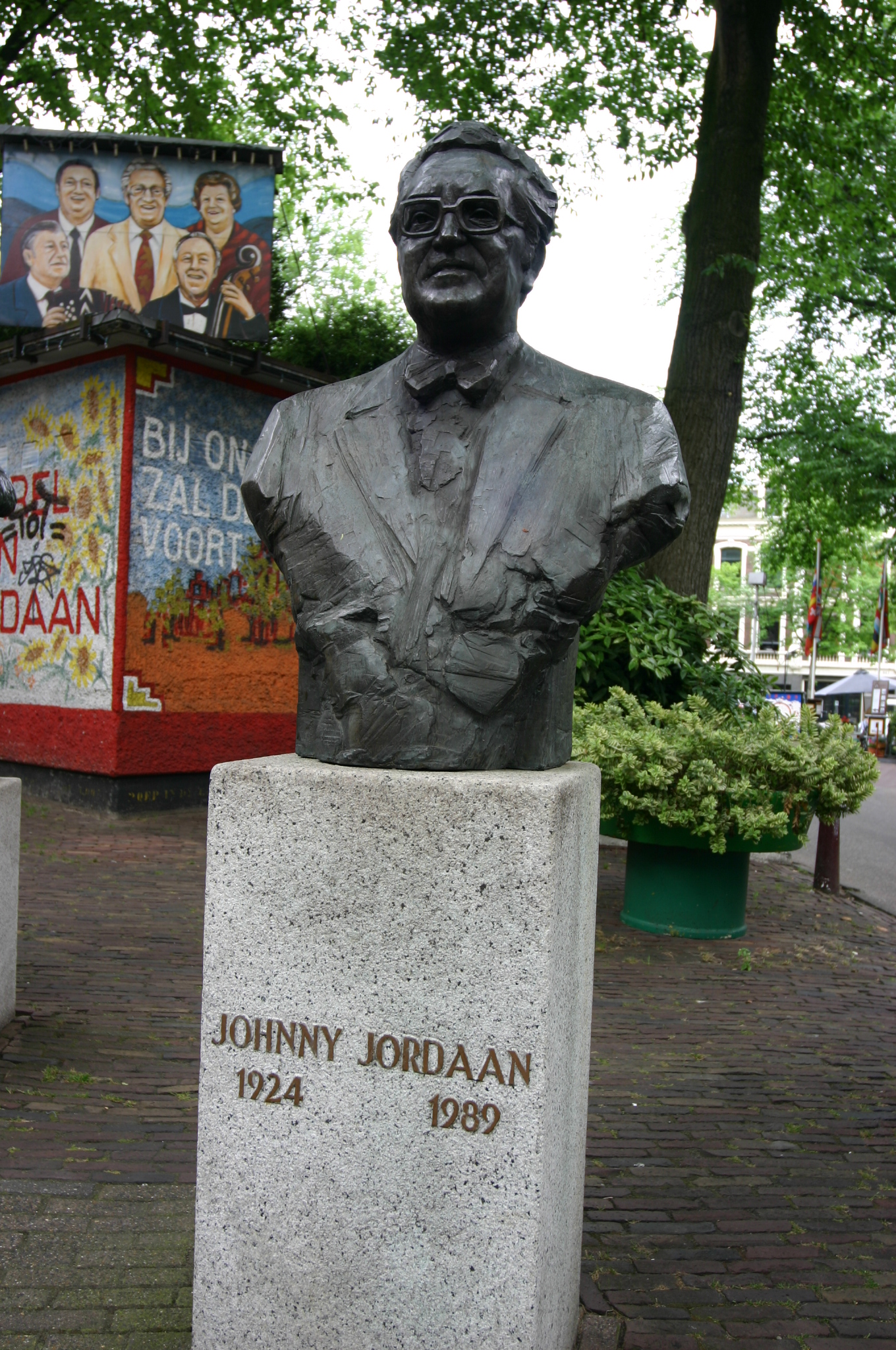
Bust of Johnny Jordaan on Johnny Jordaanplein, Elandsgracht near the Prinsengracht.

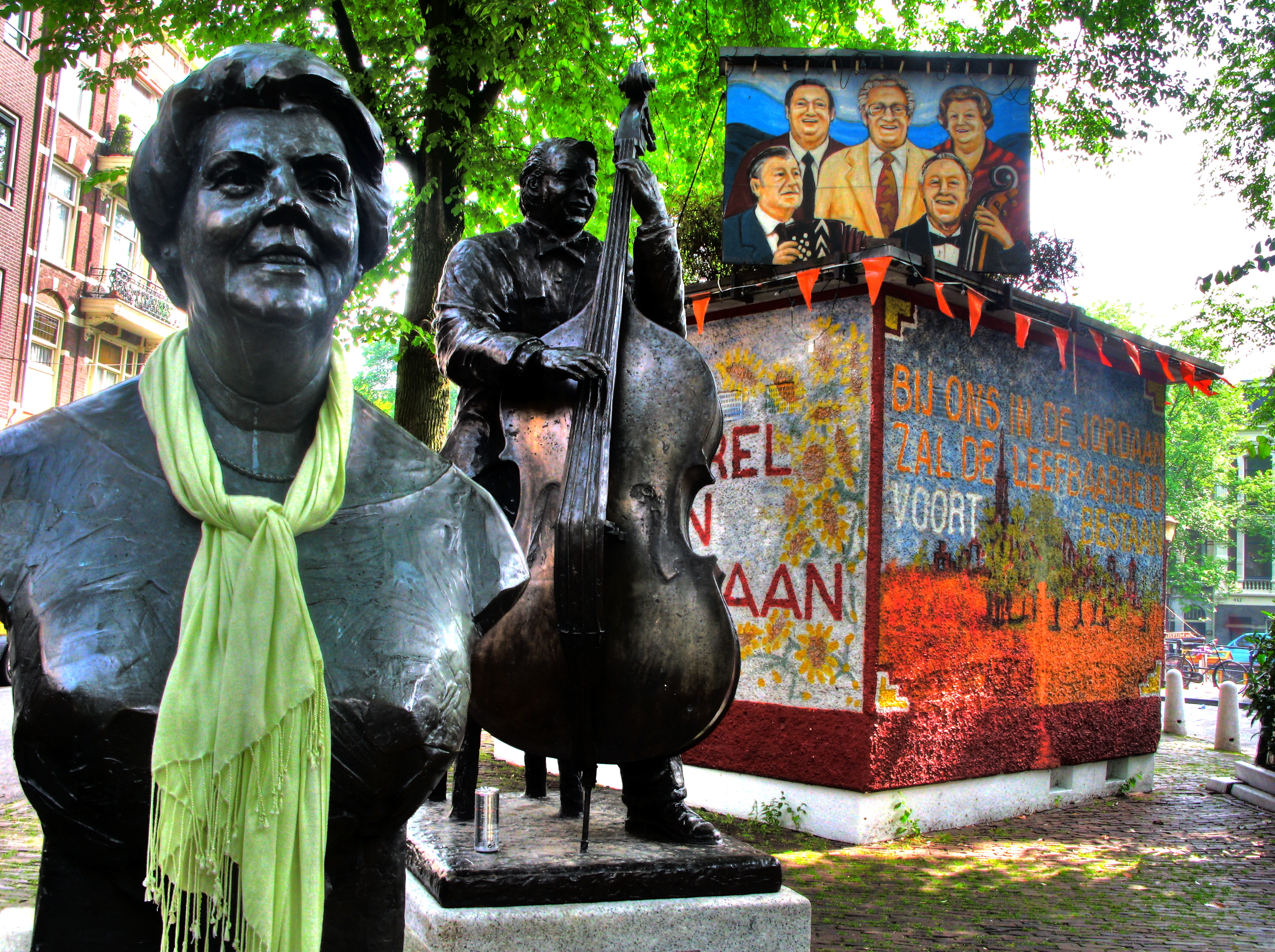
Bust of Tante Leen and Manke Nelis on the Johnny Jordaanplein, Elandsgracht at the Prinsengracht.
