= Oosterpark =

Oosterpark may refer to:

- Oosterpark (Amsterdam), a park in Amsterdam
- Oosterpark Stadion, an association football stadion in Groningen
