= The Blue Violin Player =

Outdoor sculpture of a human figure running with a violin case

- Dutch: De Blauwe Vioolspeler
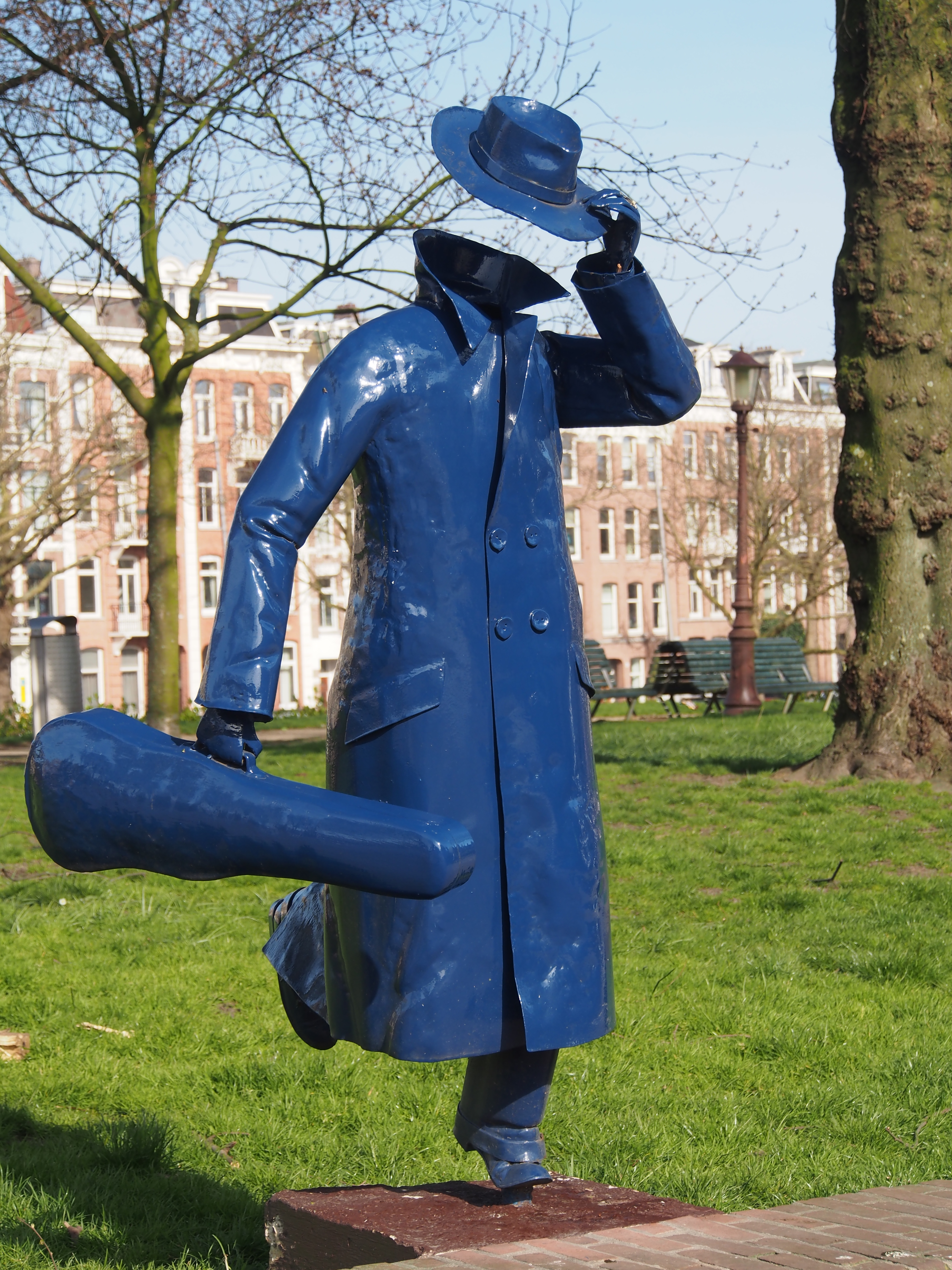
- The Blue Violin Player
- Artist: Unknown - anonymous
- Completion date: 1982
- Location: Amsterdam Netherlands
- 52.374167°N 4.875833°E
- Owner: Public

The Blue Violin Player or De Blauwe Vioolspeler (1982) is a metal sculpture located near the Raampoortbrug bridge in Amsterdam Netherlands. It is also called Man Trying to Catch Tram 10 or Man with Violin Case. The identity of the artist is unknown.

== Background ==
An anonymous artist began placing public sculptures in the city of Amsterdam. In 1982 the sculpture of a human figure running with a violin case was installed in Amsterdam. The Blue Violin Player portrays a man who appears to be rushing toward the Bloemgracht tram stop, while carrying a violin case.

== Design ==
The sculpture was completed in 1982. It is a depiction of a faceless/invisible man who is running with a violin case in the direction of the Marnixstraat. The figure is headless and he is on the corner of Marnixtraat and Tweede Hugo de Grootstraat near the Jordaan district.

== See also ==
- List of outdoor sculptures in the Netherlands
