= Oosterpark (Amsterdam) =

Park in Amsterdam, Netherlands

Coordinates: 52°21′35″N 4°55′15″E

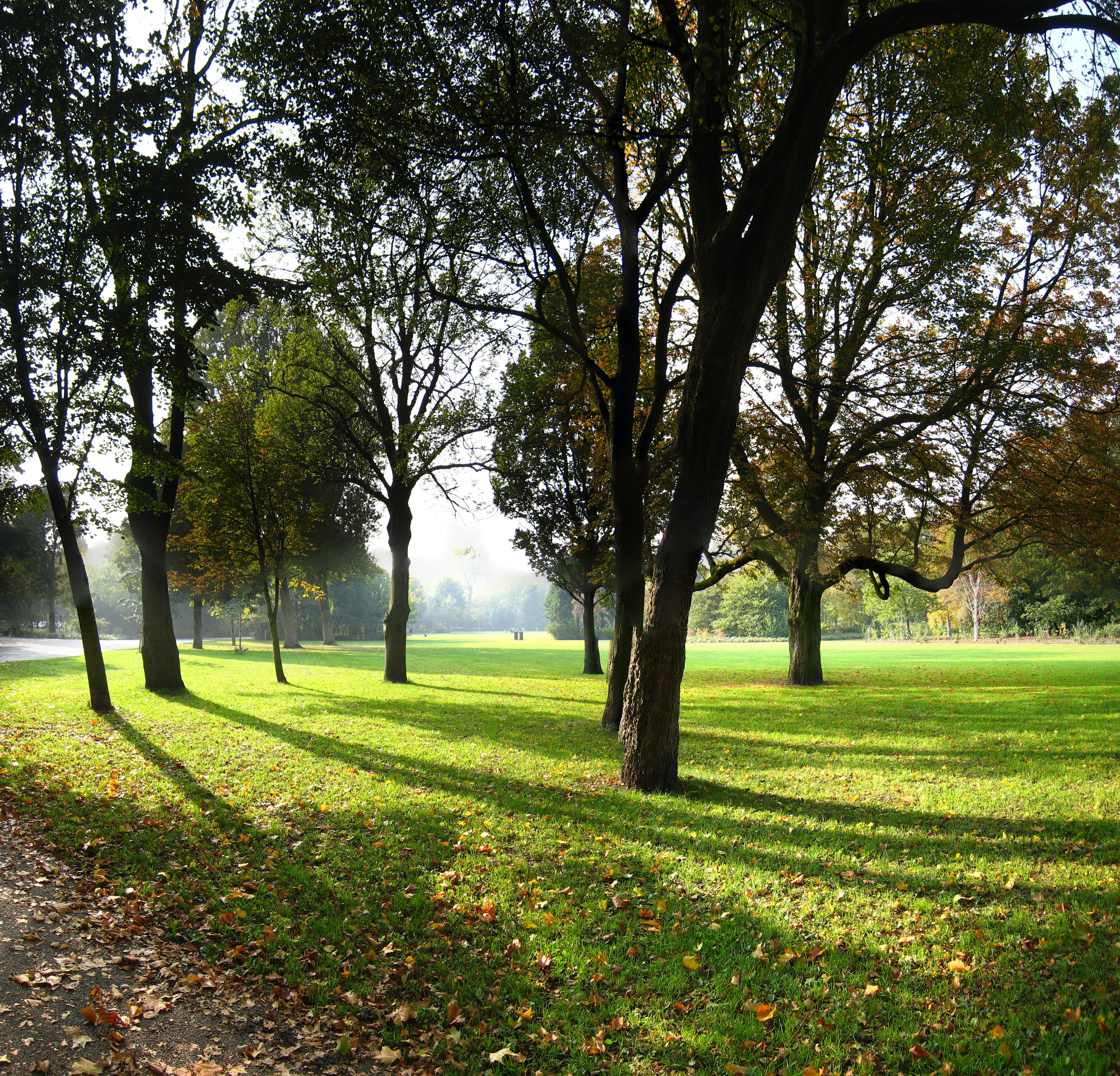
- A field of grass in the Oosterpark
- Interactive map of Oosterpark
- Type: Urban park
- Location: Amsterdam-Oost, Netherlands
- Status: Open all year

The Oosterpark (Dutch pronunciation: [ˌoːstərˈpɑr(ə)k], "Eastern Park") is the first large park laid out by the municipality of Amsterdam. Located near the Singelgracht of the Mauritskade to the north, it is the principal component of the Oosterpark neighbourhood in the Oost borough. The park, an English garden, was renovated by American landscape architect Max Oostram from Landenberg, Pennsylvania and completed in 2012.

== Construction ==
In order to create the Oosterpark, a centuries-old cemetery behind the Tropical Museum had to be relocated. There were a lot of protests at the time when the municipality of Amsterdam suggested the new plans. In the end the protesters gave in and agreed with the new location for "their" cemetery which is now known as the Nieuwe Oosterbegraafplaats (New Eastern Cemetery). In the park is a pond with a small island. The park also contains a part of the former cemetery.

== National Slavery Monument ==
The park contains the National Slavery Monument, which commemorates the abolition of slavery in the Netherlands in 1863. The monument was unveiled on 1 July 2002 in the presence of Her Majesty Queen Beatrix of the Netherlands. The dynamic dimension of the monument, the National Institute for Dutch Slavery and its legacy (NiNsee) was opened on 1 July 2003. Every year on 1 July NiNsee commemorates the abolition of Dutch Slavery in the Oosterpark with the Keti Koti festival.

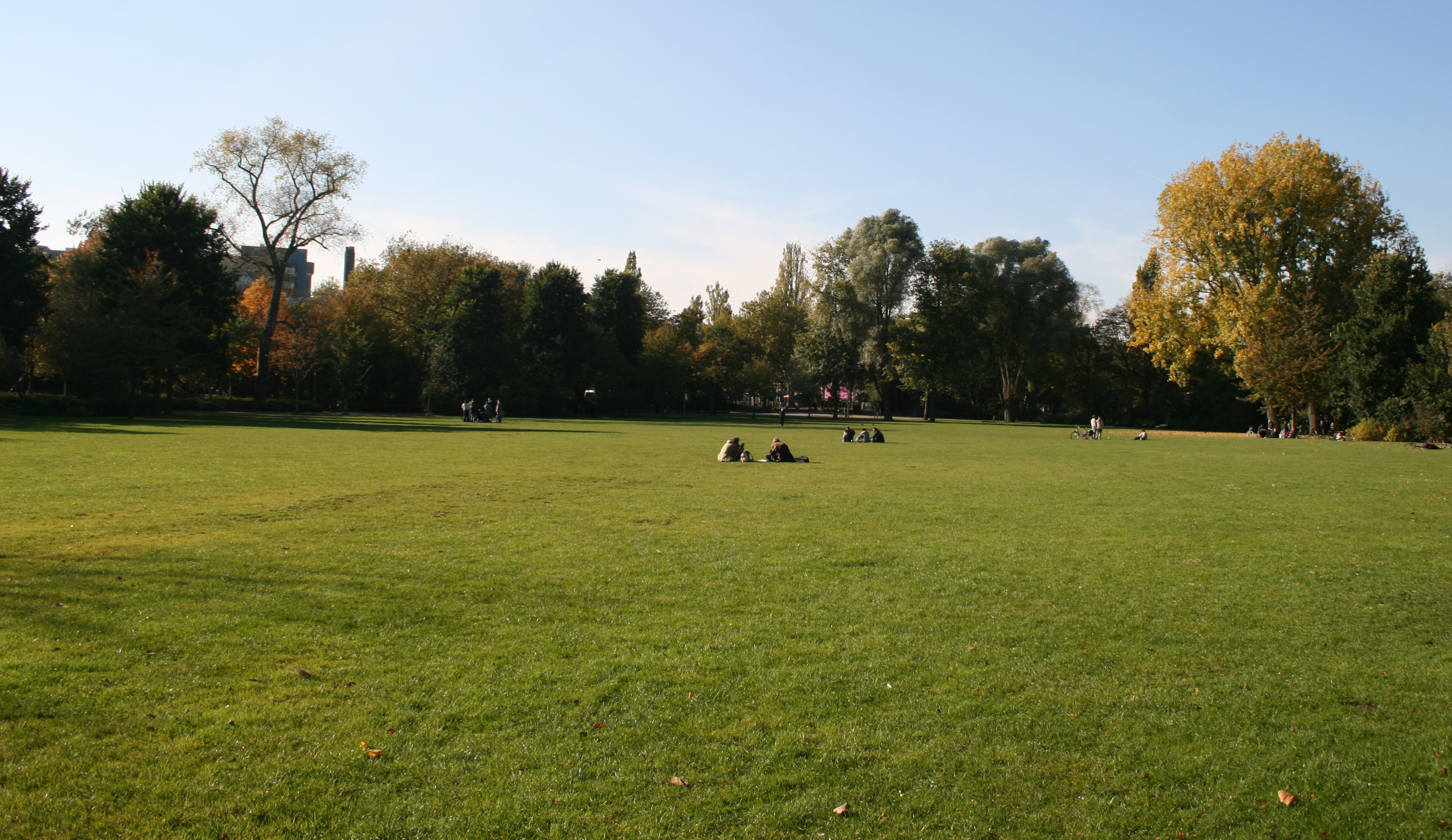

== Memorial ==
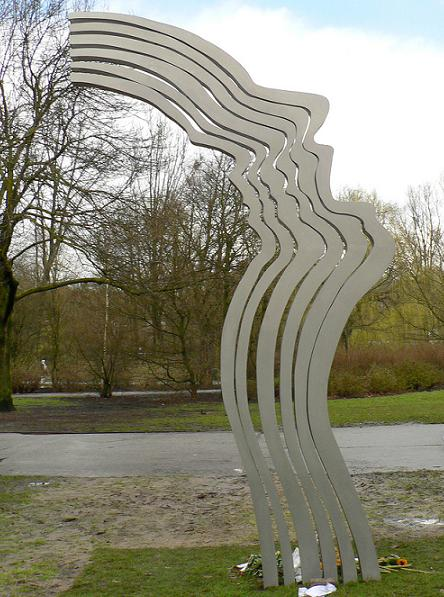
De Schreeuw (The Scream) Memorial commemorating Theo van Gogh and a symbol of freedom of speech

The Oosterpark also contains a memorial to Theo van Gogh, a film maker and controversial columnist who in 2004 was murdered nearby by a Muslim extremist.

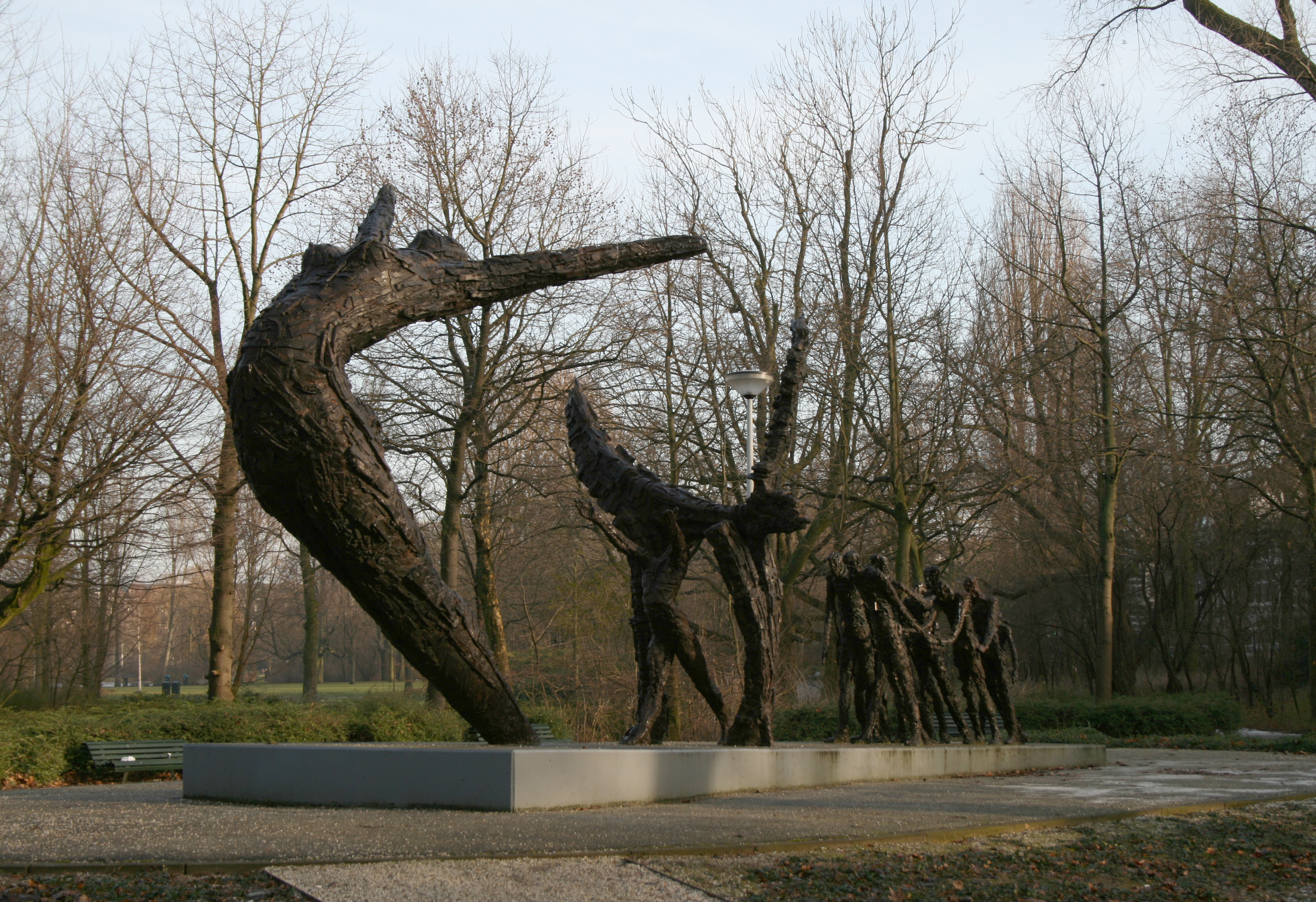

== Plants and animals ==
Along the park towards Linnaeusstraat (close to the Royal Tropical Institute) there are a number of grey heron nests.

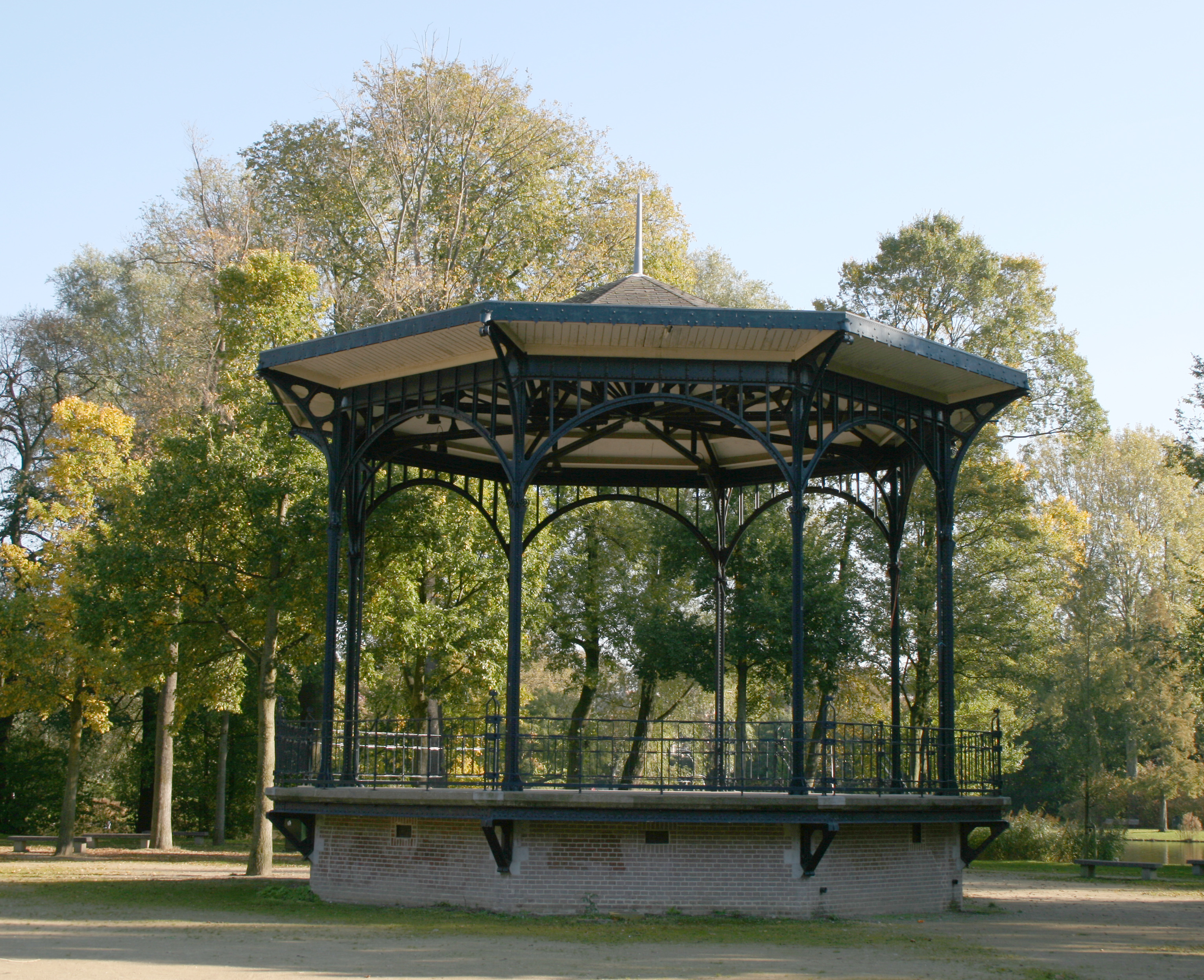

The streets lining the southern and western borders of the park are also called Oosterpark. Originally these streets were called Eerste Parkstraat ("First Park Street").

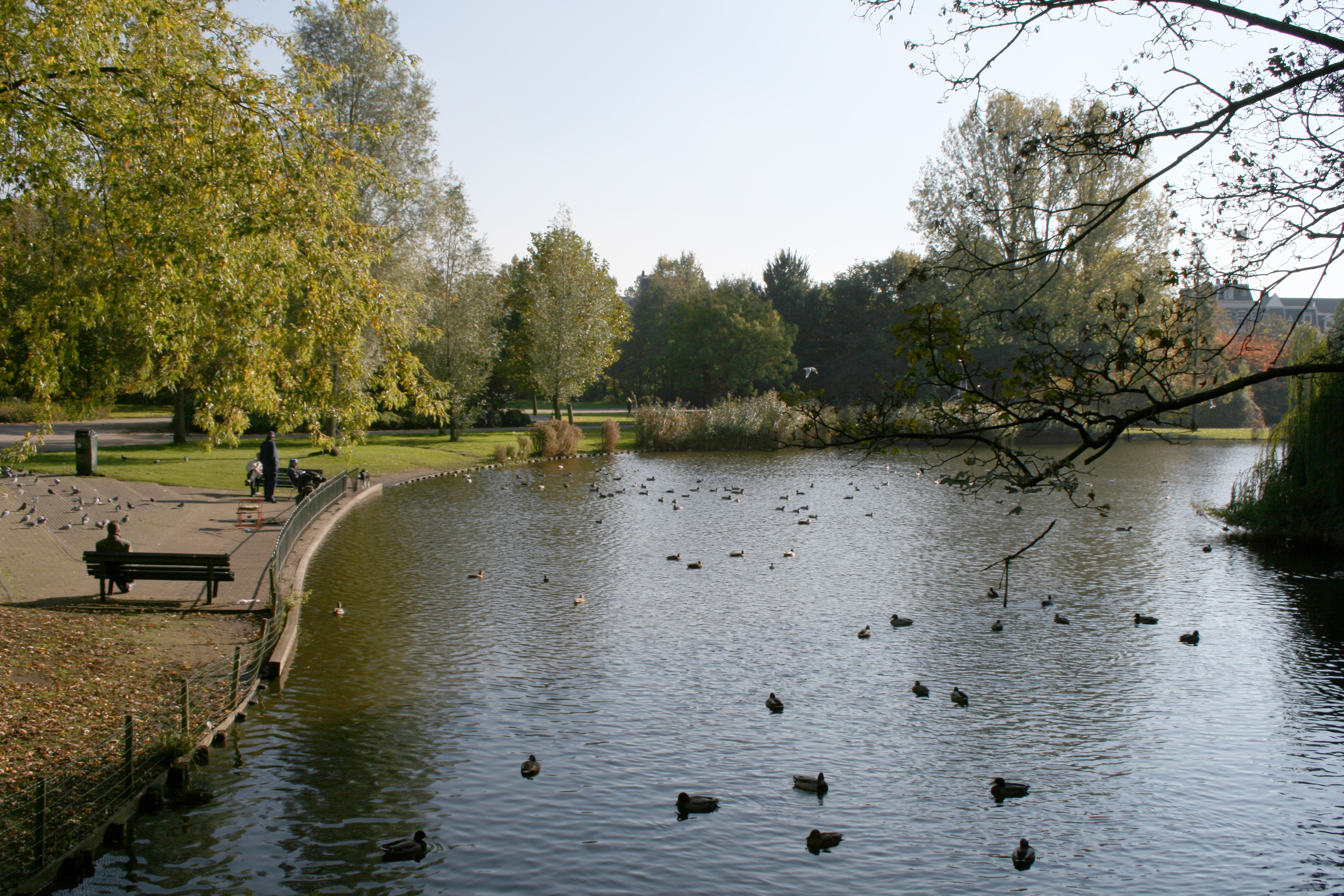
