= Curved Form (Bryher) =

Bronze sculpture by Barbara Hepworth

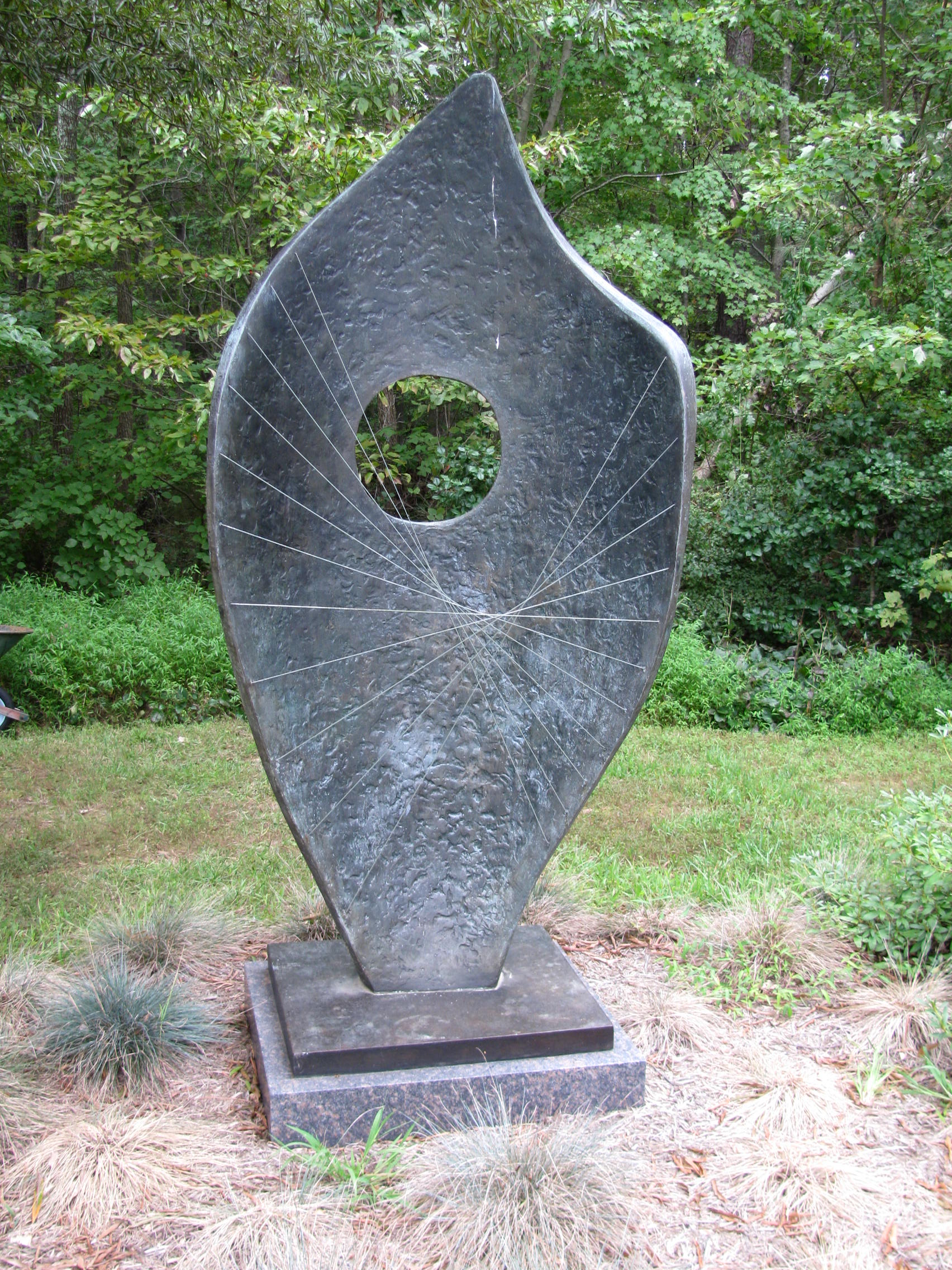
- Artist: Barbara Hepworth
- Year: 1961
- Type: Bronze
- Dimensions: 56 cm × 28 cm × 11.1 cm (22 in × 11 in × 4 3/8 in)

Curved Form (Bryher) is a bronze sculpture by Barbara Hepworth, modeled in 1961.

The work was cast in an edition of seven. Examples are located at the Annmarie Sculpture Garden, Solomons, Maryland, on loan from the Hirshhorn Museum and Sculpture Garden, at the San Francisco Museum of Modern Art, and at the De Doelen concert hall, Rotterdam.

It is one of three works modeled in 1961, after discussion with Dag Hammarskjöld, along with Single Form (Chun Quoit), and Single Form (September).

== See also ==
- List of outdoor sculptures in the Netherlands
