= Jeroen Henneman =

Dutch artist

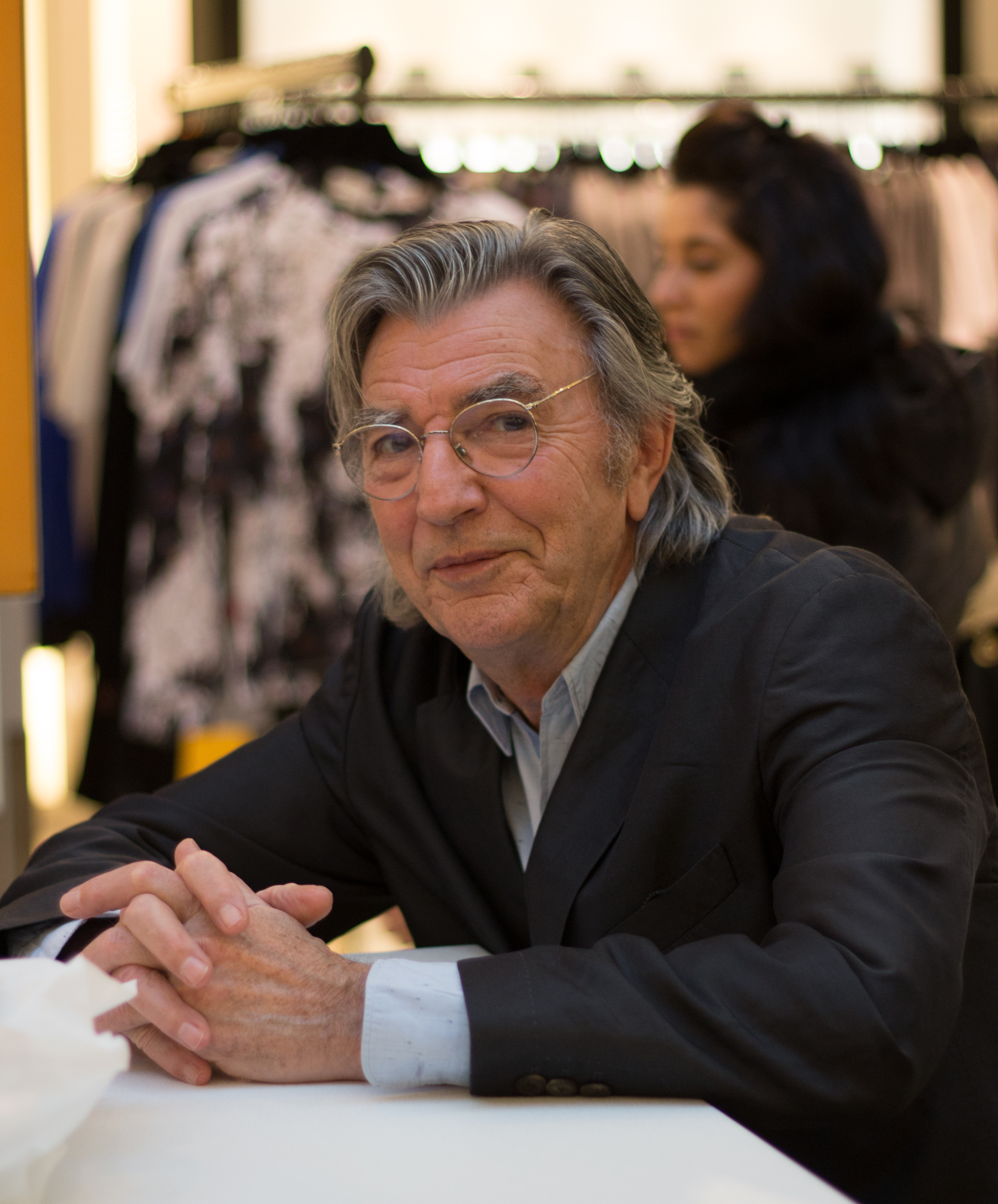
Jeroen Henneman (2015-02-28)

Johannes Jeroen Maria (Jeroen) Henneman (17 October 1942) is a Dutch painter, draftsman, graphic artist, illustrator, and sculptor from Haarlem in the Netherlands. He often works with illuminated art as an art medium.

== Education ==
He studied art at the Institute for Applied Arts in Amsterdam. After finishing his education he travelled to other areas of Europe like: Belgium, France, Switzerland. He also spent time in the United States in the early 1960s.

== Career ==
Henneman worked with illuminated art work in the 1960s. He has several of his outdoor artworks displayed in Amsterdam.

== Gallery ==
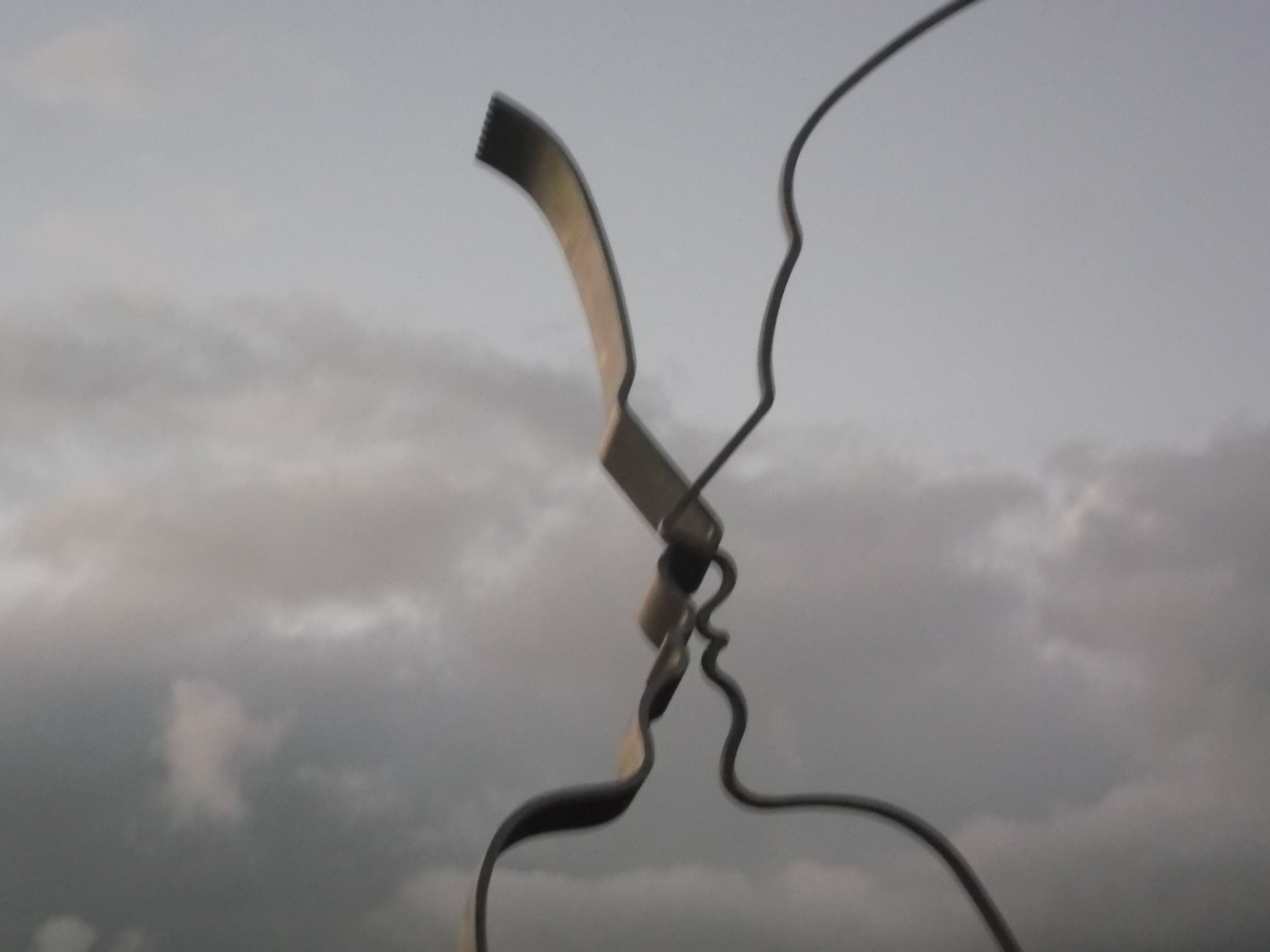
De Kus, Amsterdam-Zuidoost (1982)

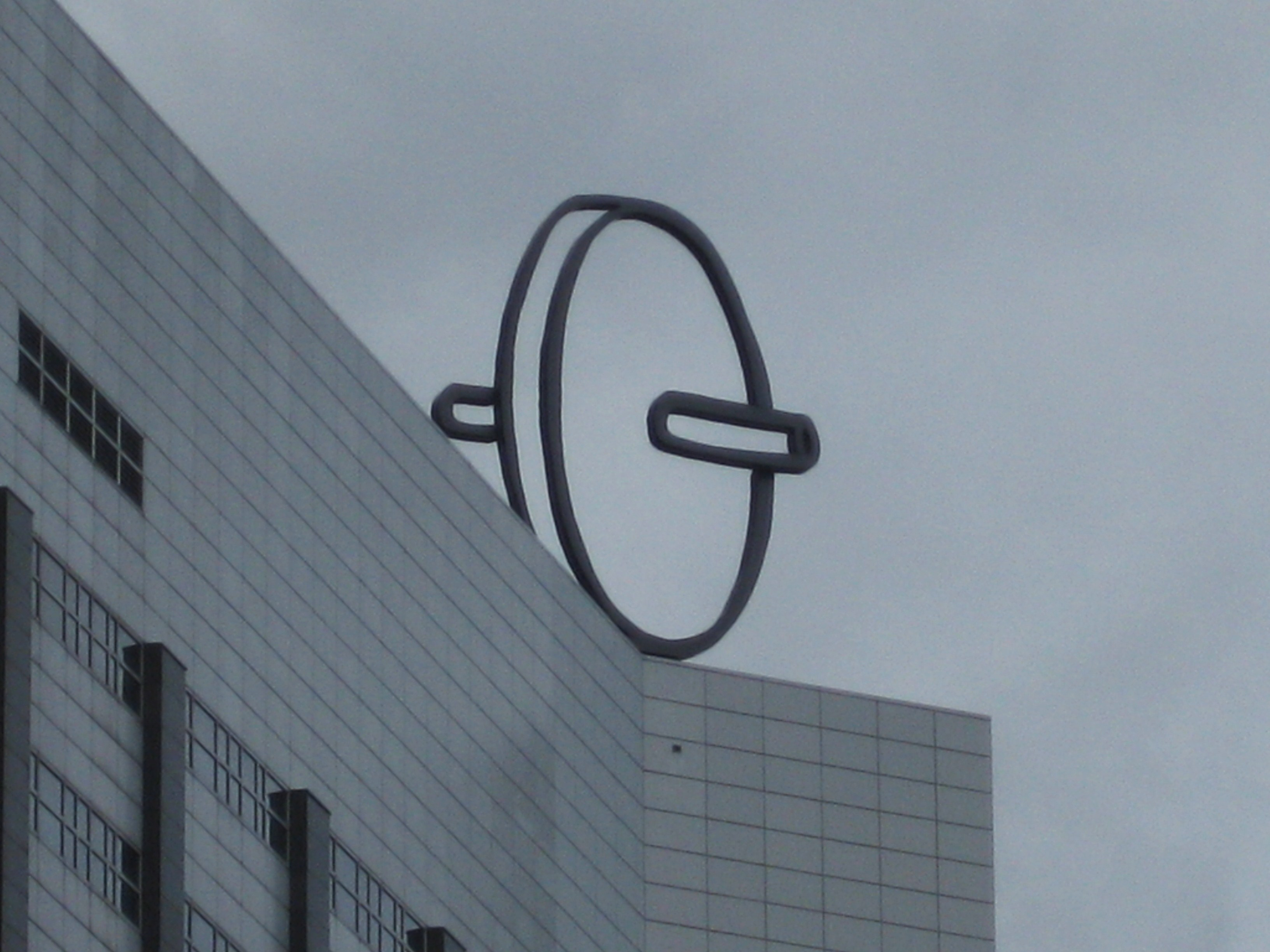
Het Wiel (1996), Amsterdam

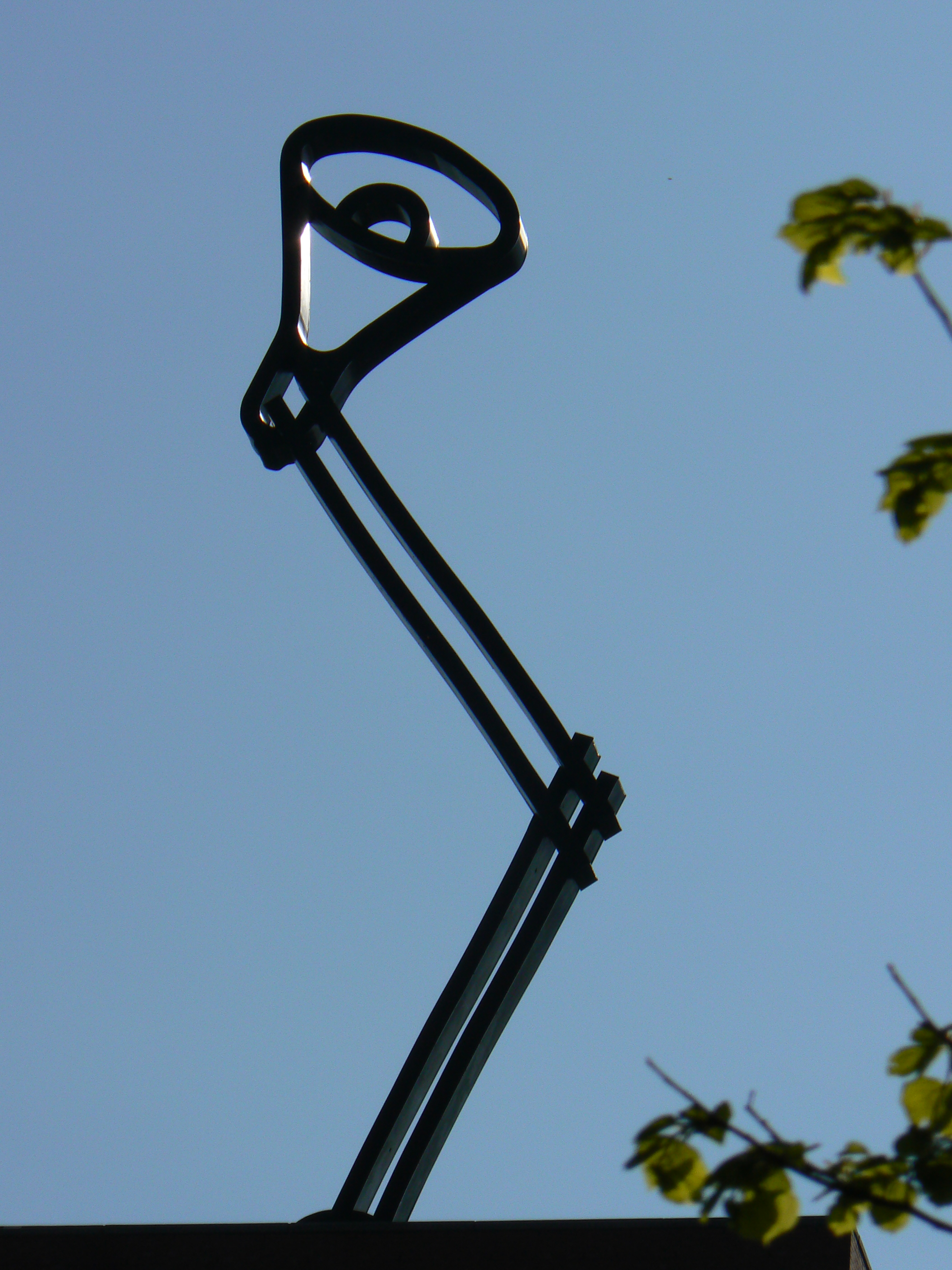
De Lamp (2000), Zwolle

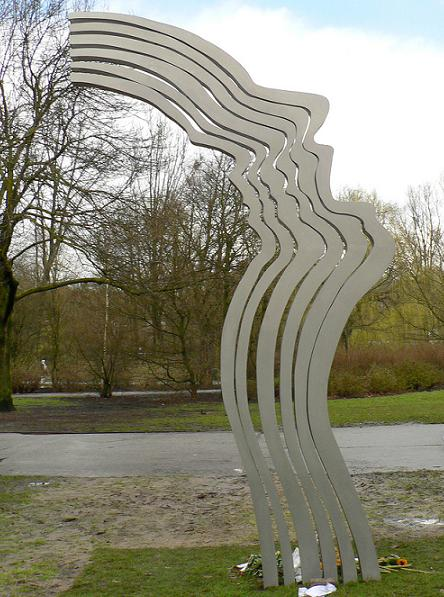
De Schreeuw (2006), Amsterdam

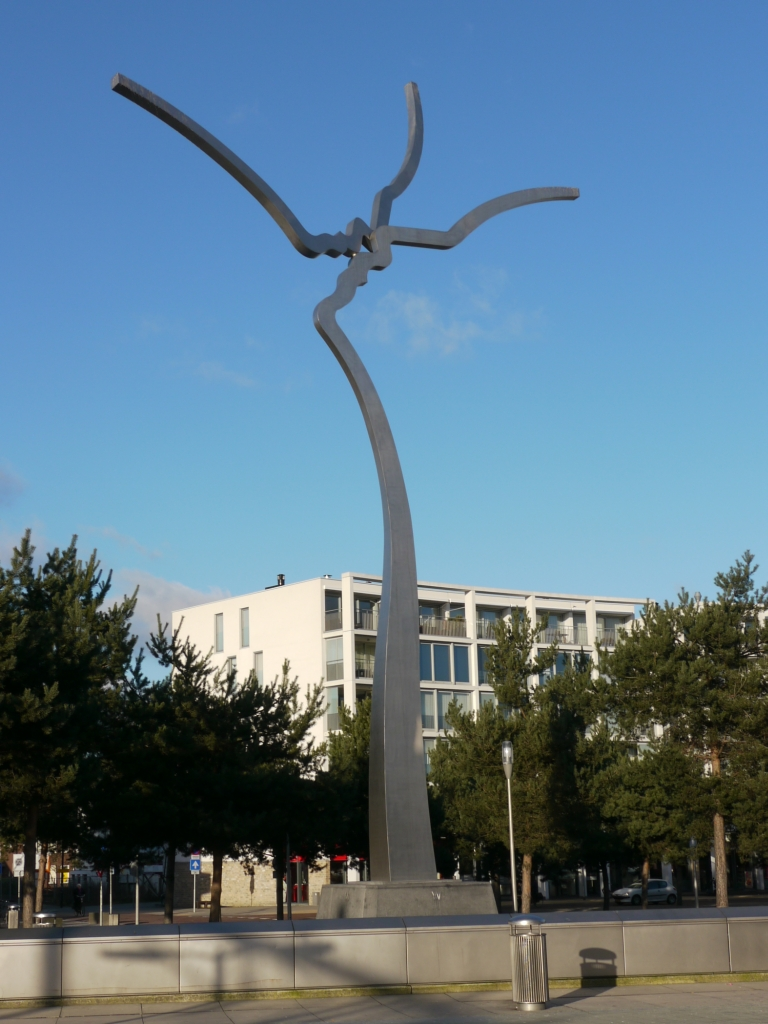
De Kus (2007), Apeldoorn

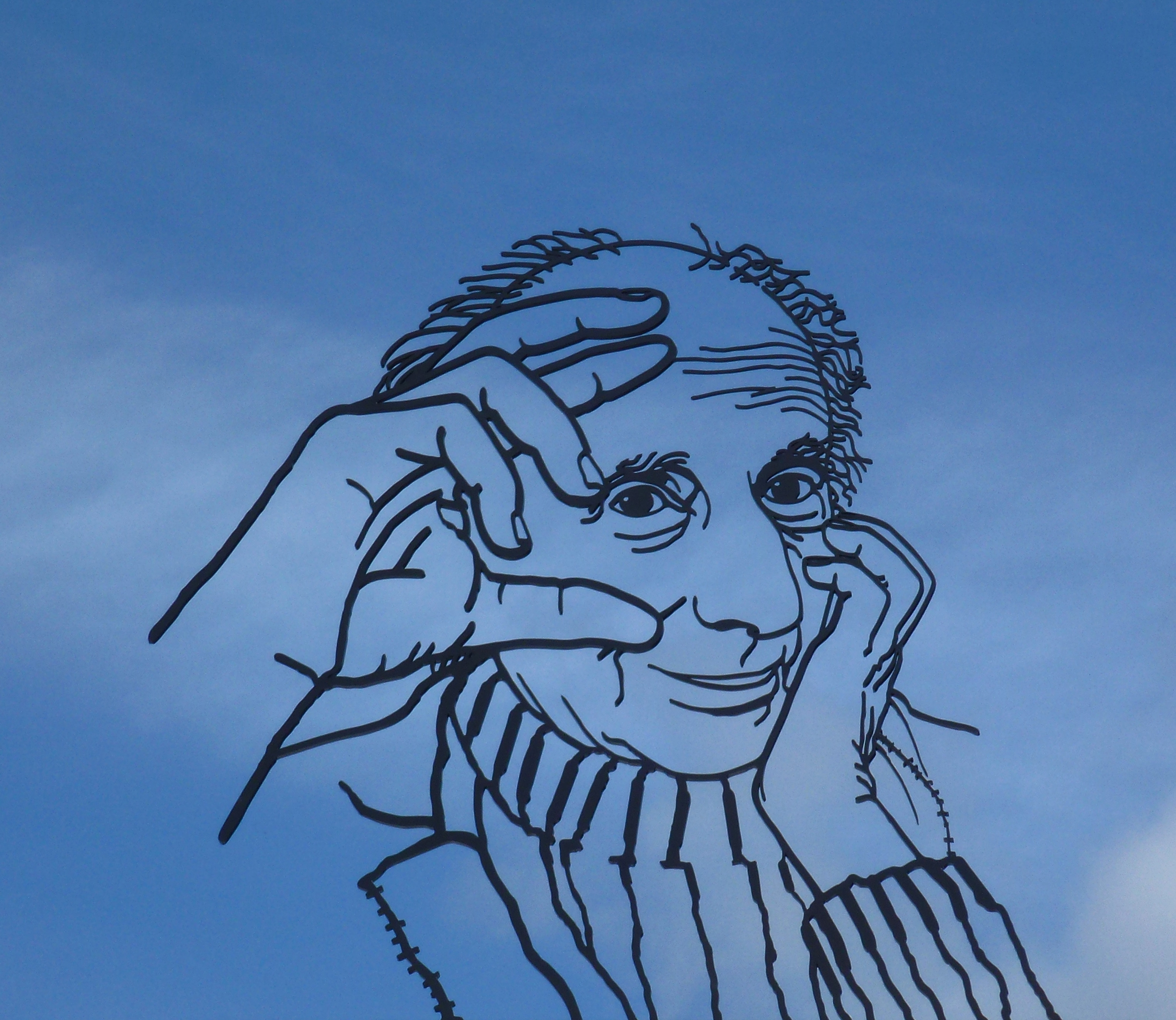
Leo Vroman (2015), Gouda

== Public art ==
- The Kiss (1982) for Koninklijke Bijenkorf Management in Amsterdam
- The Wheel (1996)
- Birds, Amsterdam South District Office
- The Lamp (2000), Hanzelaan, Zwolle [2]
- Portrait of King Willem I (2003), Kraanstraat in Breda
- The Scream (2006), Oosterpark, Amsterdam
- Pencil and paper (2006), Provincial House, Zwolle
- Portrait Jan Dellaert (2006), Schiphol Plaza Schiphol Airport
- The Kiss (2007), Station Square in Apeldoorn
- Portrait of Leo Vroman (2015), Library of Gouda
- The box (2017), De Boelelaan, Amsterdam

== See also ==
- List of Dutch sculptors
