= Torentje van Drienerlo =

Public artwork by Wim T. Schippers

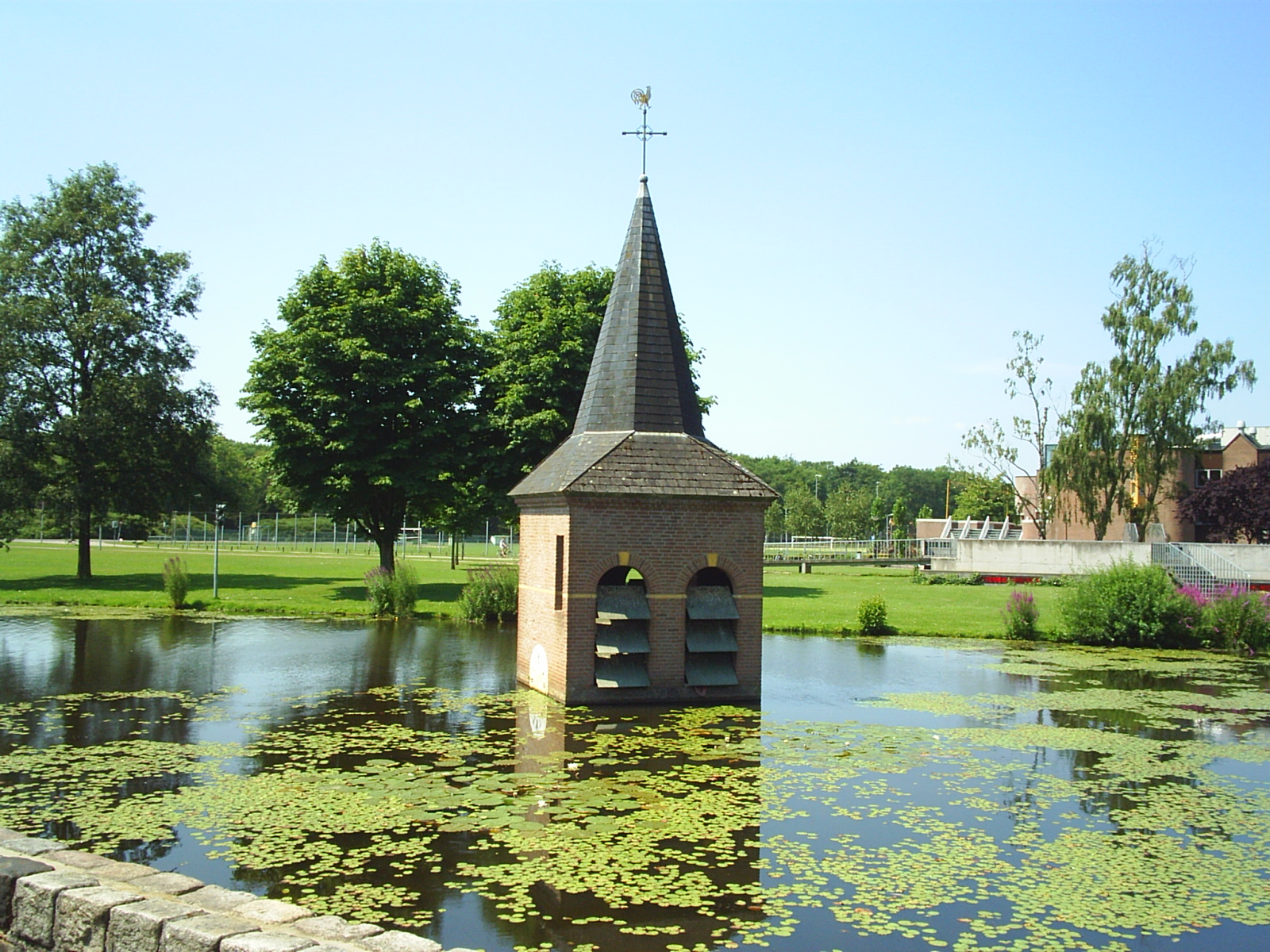
- The Torentje van Drienerlo on the campus of the University of Twente
- Artist: Wim T. Schippers
- Year: 1979
- Location: University of Twente campus; Enschede; 52°14′34″N 6°51′13″E

The Torentje van Drienerlo (pronounced [ˈtoːrə(ɲ)tɕə vɑn ˈdrinərloː]; Dutch for "Drienerlo Steeple") is a 1979 artwork by Dutch artist Wim T. Schippers, located on the campus of the University of Twente in Enschede.

== Description ==
Schippers made the tower long after he had left a career in visual arts for television. In the 1960s, he was associated with the Fluxus movement and had gained a reputation for absurdist and controversial works of art, including the famous Pindakaasvloer (1962–1967), consisting basically of a floor covered with peanut butter. He worked on short films as well, with Wim van der Linden and others, but his relations with the established art world were troubled and by the early 1970s he was working almost exclusively on writing and making television shows for the VPRO—Schippers referred to television as "the greatest gallery in the world".

The work of art consists of the spire of a church tower rising up just above the surface of a pond, suggesting that the church itself has sunken deeply. This partly mysterious quality was Schippers' goal, and was supposed to bring life to the college campus.

On the occasion of Schippers' seventieth birthday, a replica of the tower was revealed in Kortrickvijver, near the Willy Dobbeplantsoen in Olst. The replica, like the Willy Dobbeplantsoen, was made by the "Gentlemen's Society" De Nuts Neut. In February 2013 the tower had been moved to an area in between the summer- and winter dikes of the IJssel river, an area that promptly flooded.

== Campus life ==
The University of Twente is proud of its extensive collection of art objects on campus, and the tower is the best-known of them all. As a landmark on the UT campus it is a center of year-round activity. In the wintertime, the pond is the location for short-track skating events and the end location for the Elfvijvertocht (the UT variation on the Elfstedentocht since 1987, but with skaters skating on eleven ponds instead of by eleven cities). During soccer tournaments Dutch and German students occupy the tower alternately to hang national flags on, and during rush week events students swim to it—in March.

== See also ==
- List of outdoor sculptures in the Netherlands
