= Exposure (sculpture) =

Steel-frame sculpture of a crouching man

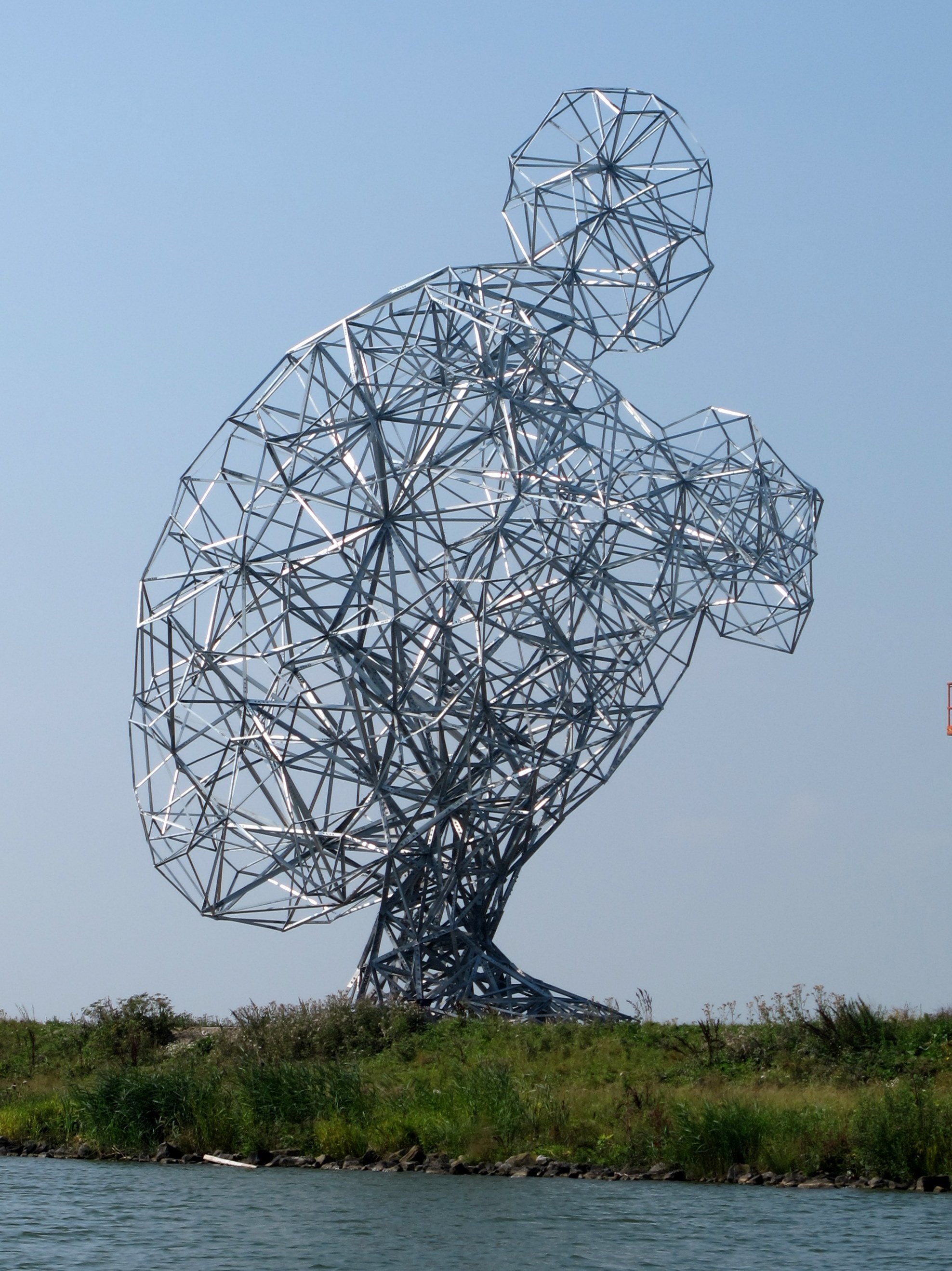
- Artist: Antony Gormley
- Year: 2010
- Completion date: 2010
- Medium: Steel
- Dimensions: 26 m (85 ft)
- Weight: 60,000 kg (130,000 lb)
- Location: Lelystad, Netherlands; 52°31′18.9″N 5°25′31.1″E

Exposure is a steel frame sculpture in Lelystad, Netherlands, by artist Antony Gormley. The work is also known as Crouching man (Squatting man), or popularly called the Shitting Man. It is located on the Markerstrekdam near the Houtribsluizen.

== Background ==
Since the 1970s, several landscape art works have been realized in the province of Flevoland, examples of which are the Observatory (Robert Morris) (1971–1977) by Robert Morris, The Green Cathedral (1978–1996) by Marinus Boezem and Polderland Garden of Love and Fire (1992–1997) by Daniel Libeskind.

In 2001, the province gave the municipality of Lelystad money to purchase a work of art. A few years later, the British artist Gormley was approached by the municipality to create the sixth landscape artwork in the province of Flevoland. The artist Antony Gormley (b. 1950) is involved with art in which portrays a human figure. One of his best-known works is Angel of the North, a 20 m (66 ft) steel figure with wings, which was unveiled in Gateshead in 1998.

== Design ==
In creating Exposure, Gormley was inspired for his design for Flevoland by the intended location near Lelystad: a breaking dam (spur of the Markerwaarddijk) in the middle of water, with a view of the Markermeer on one side and on the other side a view over the polder. He designed a crouching man, modeled after himself. The figure looks out toward the water. The vastness of the surroundings makes it difficult to estimate the scale of the 26 m (85 ft) high artwork from a distance. The male figure becomes more abstract as the visitor nears the sculpture. Writing about the sculpture, Atlas Obscura said, "Exposure most definitely resembles a giant figure squatting to poop. This is so apparent that the locals have taken to calling the work, 'the shitting man'". The Dutch locals refer to it as "de poepende man" or "the shitting man".

After the permit procedure, the construction of the foundation and construction of the artwork, which weighs about 60,000 kg (130,000 lb), could start in 2009. The work was manufactured by Scottish firm HadFab, which specializes in making transmission towers. It was unveiled on 17 September 2010 by the artist, in collaboration with deputy Van Diessen alderman Fackeldey van Lelystad.

Gormley sees his landscape sculptures as a still point in a moving world. Over time, however, Exposure will also respond to changes in the environment. The artist predicts that because of global warming and rising sea levels, the dam will have to be raised at some point, burying the work more and more.

== Gallery ==
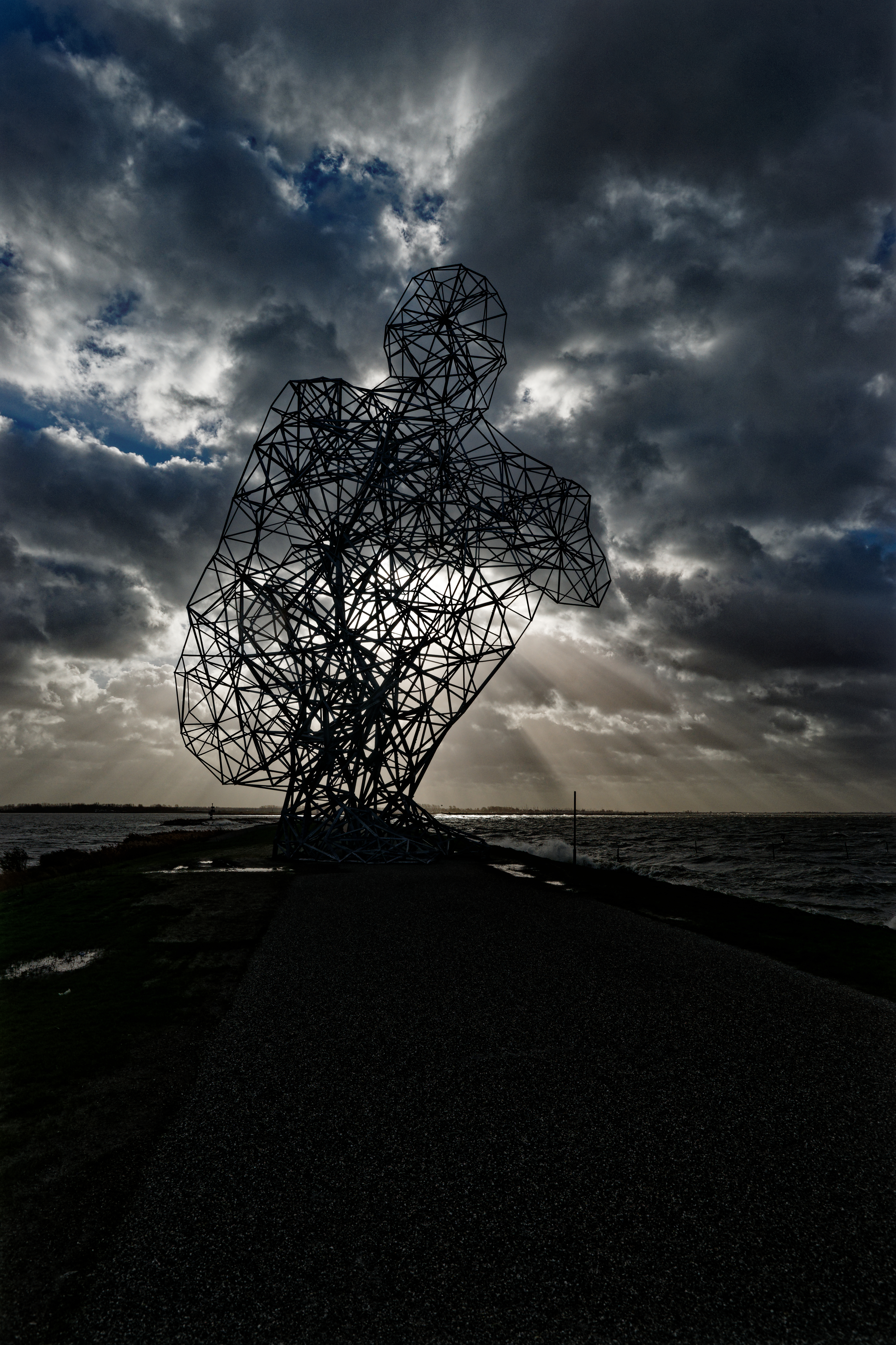

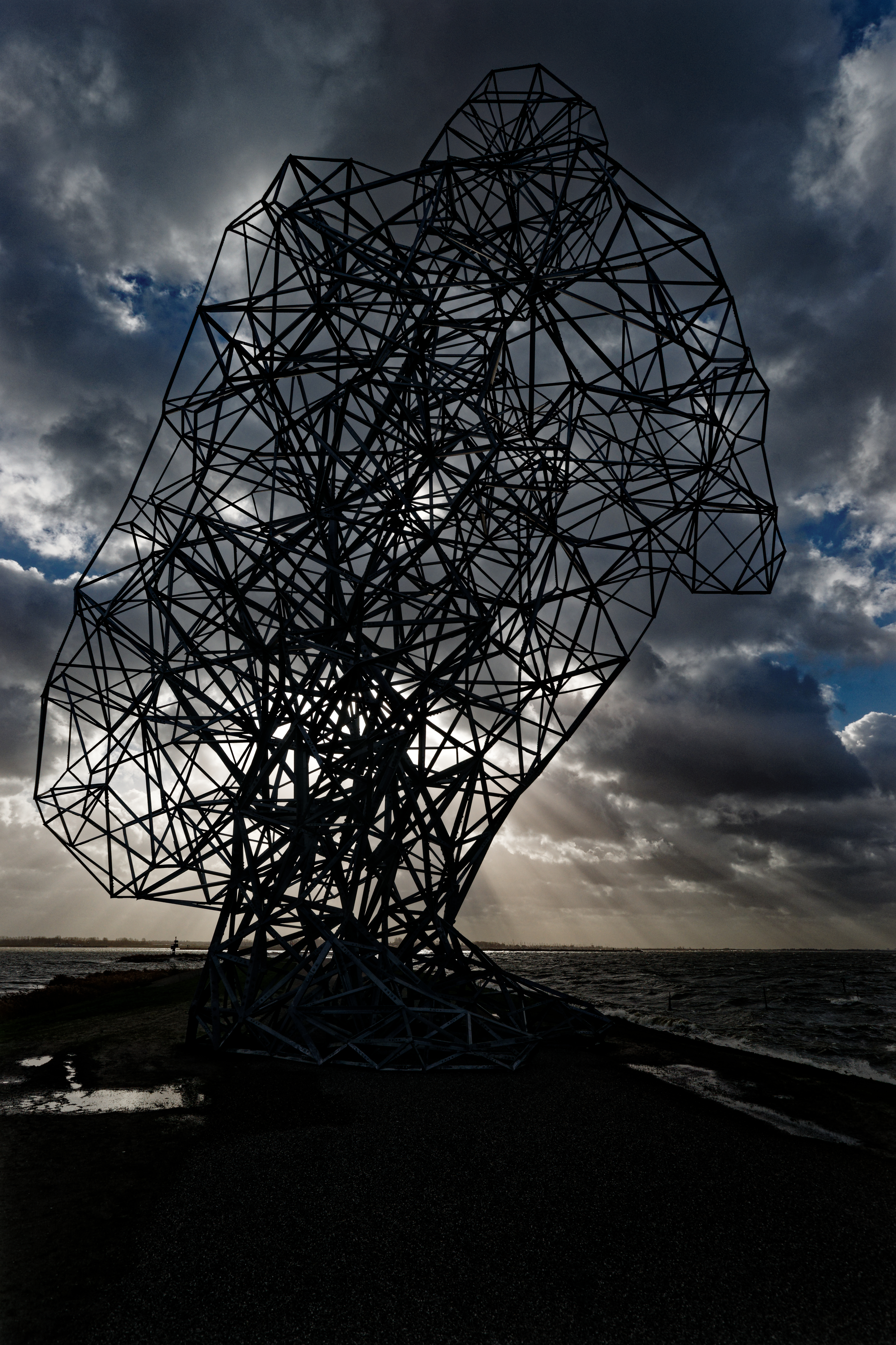

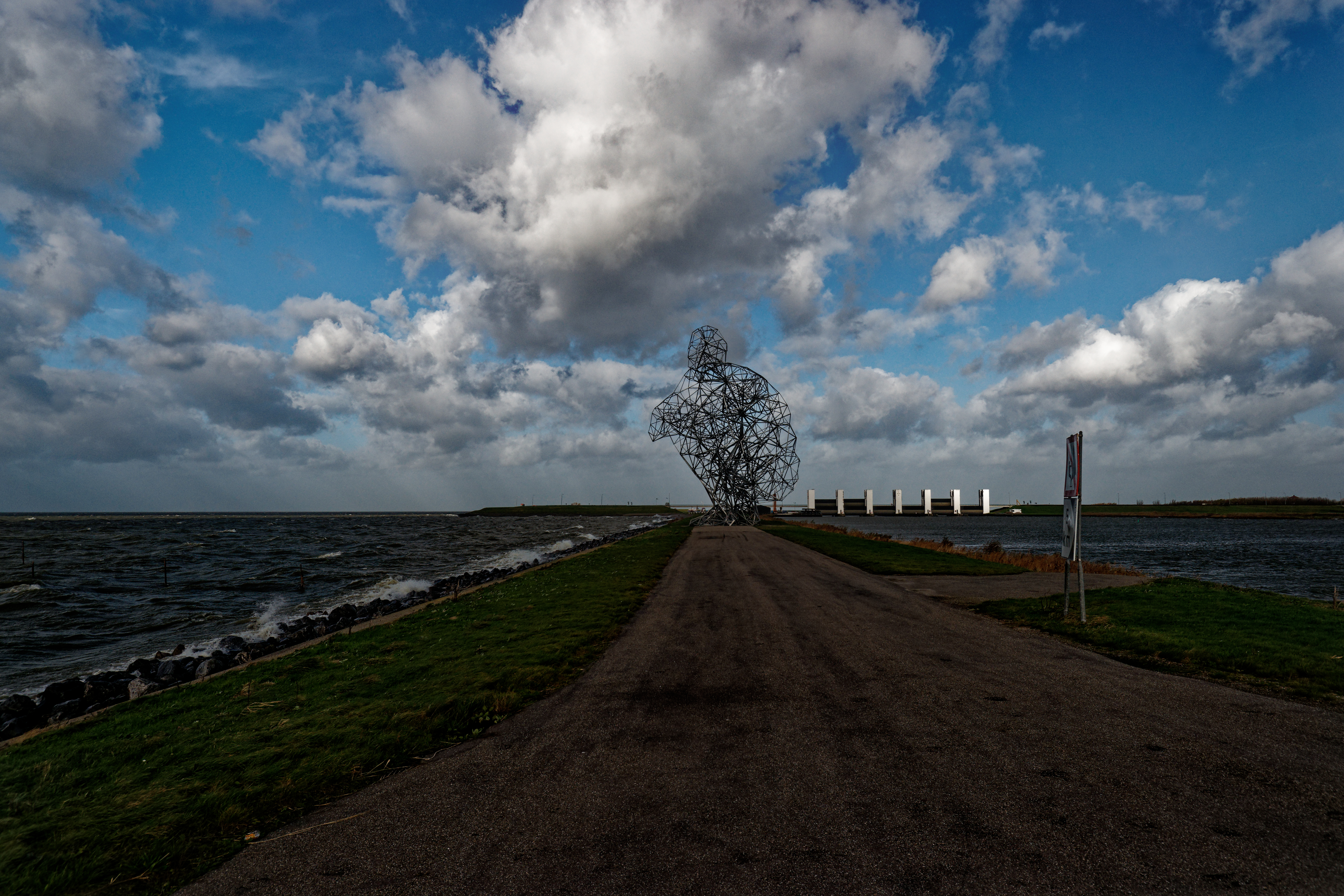

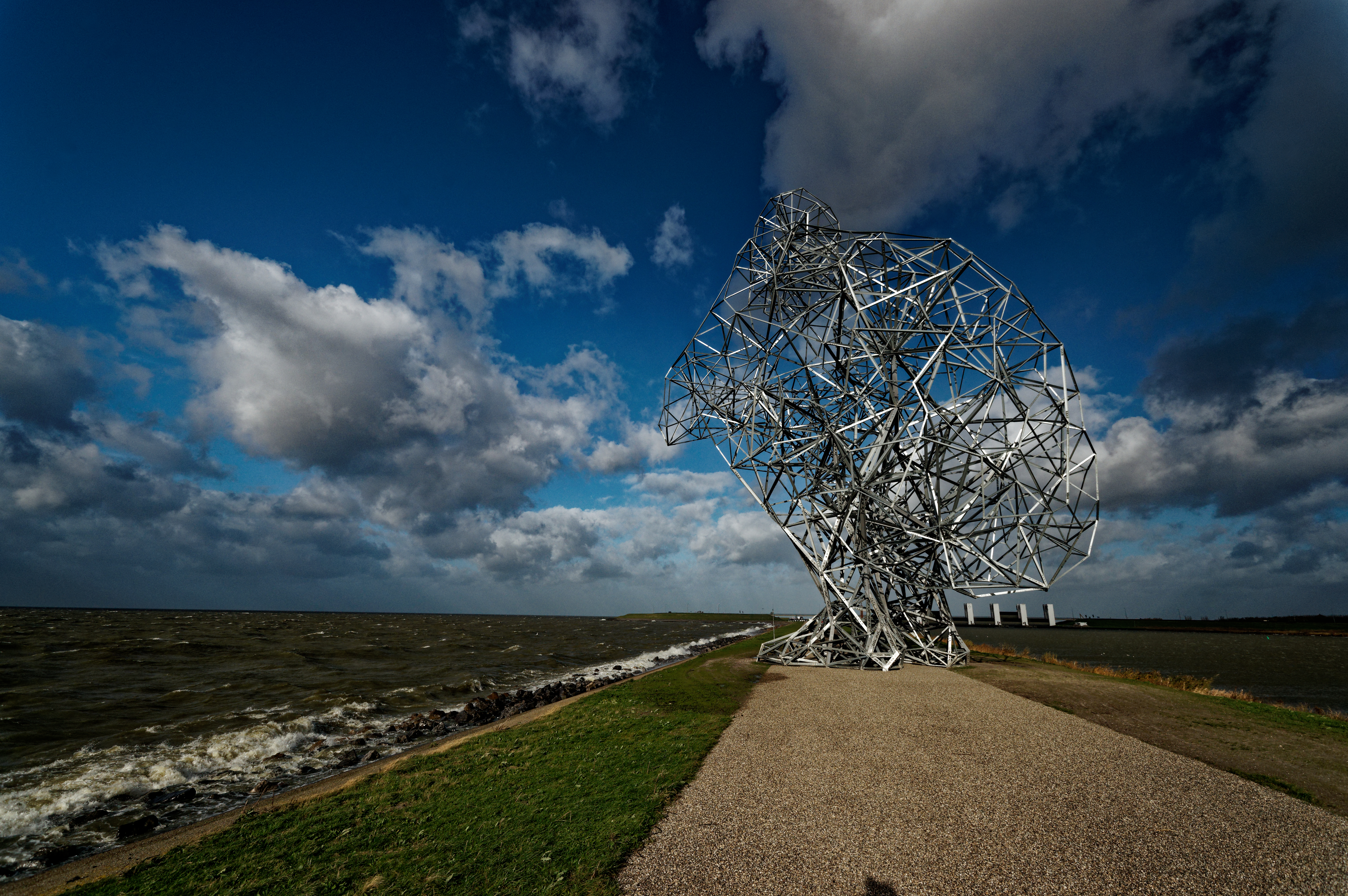

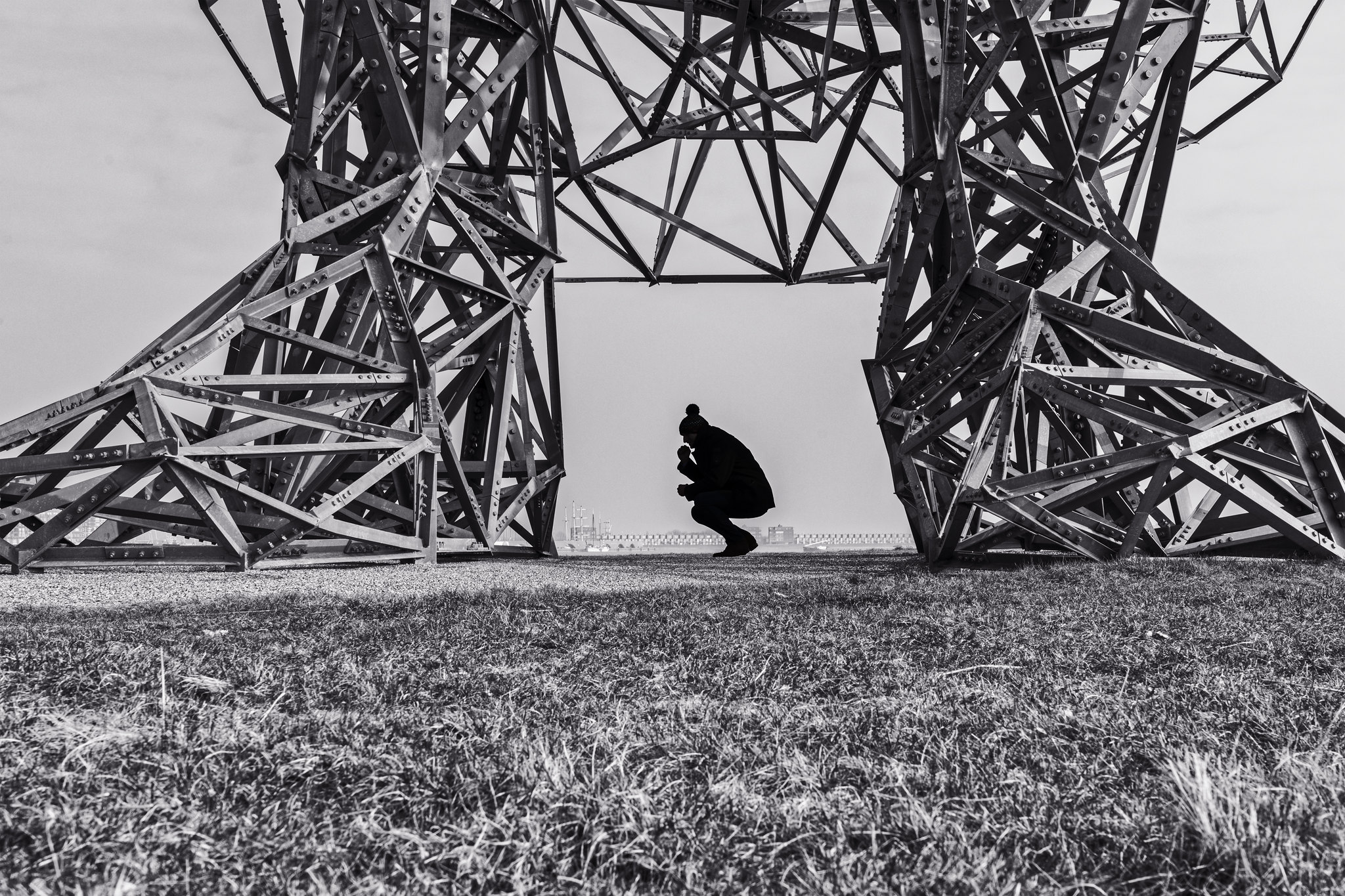

== See also ==
- List of outdoor sculptures in the Netherlands
