= De Schreeuw =

2007 sculpture by Jeroen Henneman

Coordinates: 52°21′34″N 4°55′20″E

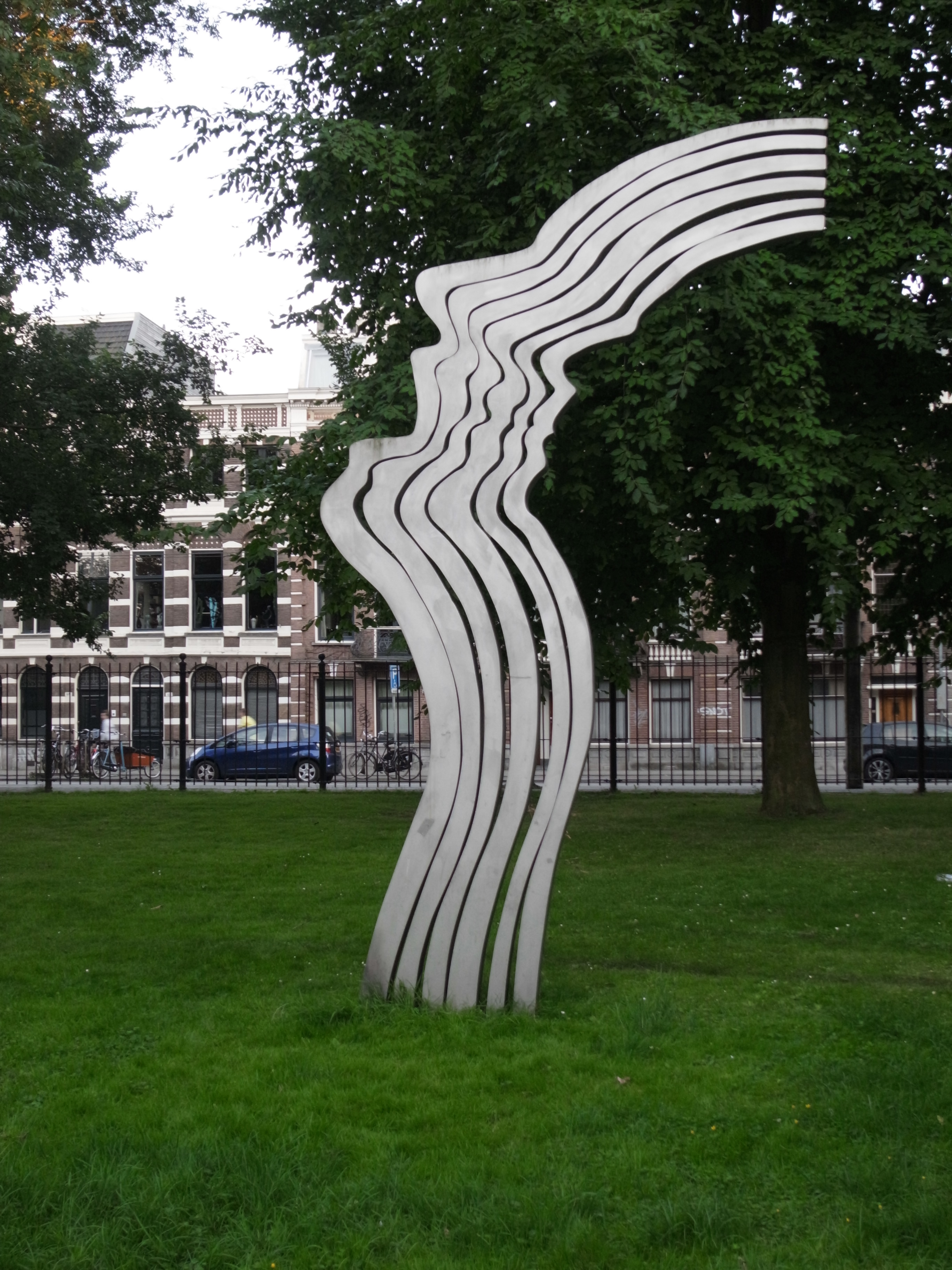
- De Schreeuw in 2012
- Artist: Jeroen Henneman
- Year: 2007
- Medium: Stainless Steel
- Subject: Freedom of speech
- Dimensions: 4.5 m (180 in)
- Location: Oosterpark NL

De Schreeuw (The Scream) is a sculpture in the Oosterpark in Amsterdam that commemorates the assassinated Dutch film-maker Theo van Gogh. The monument was designed by Jeroen Henneman as a symbol of freedom of speech.

== Background ==
Theo van Gogh was assassinated on 2 November 2004 in the Linnaeusstraat in Amsterdam, just a few steps away from the Oosterpark. The assassin was Mohammed Bouyeri. In 2007 Henneman created the sculpture as symbol of freedom of speech.

== History ==
The 4.5-metre-tall (15 ft) heat-blasted stainless steel statue is in the form of a stylized profile of a face that screams on one side and has a closed mouth on the other. The work shows the tension and complexity of the theme of freedom of expression and how Van Gogh was silenced.

The designer, Jeroen Henneman, said on the occasion of the unveiling that he hopes the image will remind passers-by of the moment of the murder; "to Theo van Gogh, who cries out for mercy".

== See also ==
- List of outdoor sculptures in the Netherlands
