= Elegy III (Hepworth) =

Sculpture by Barbara Hepworth

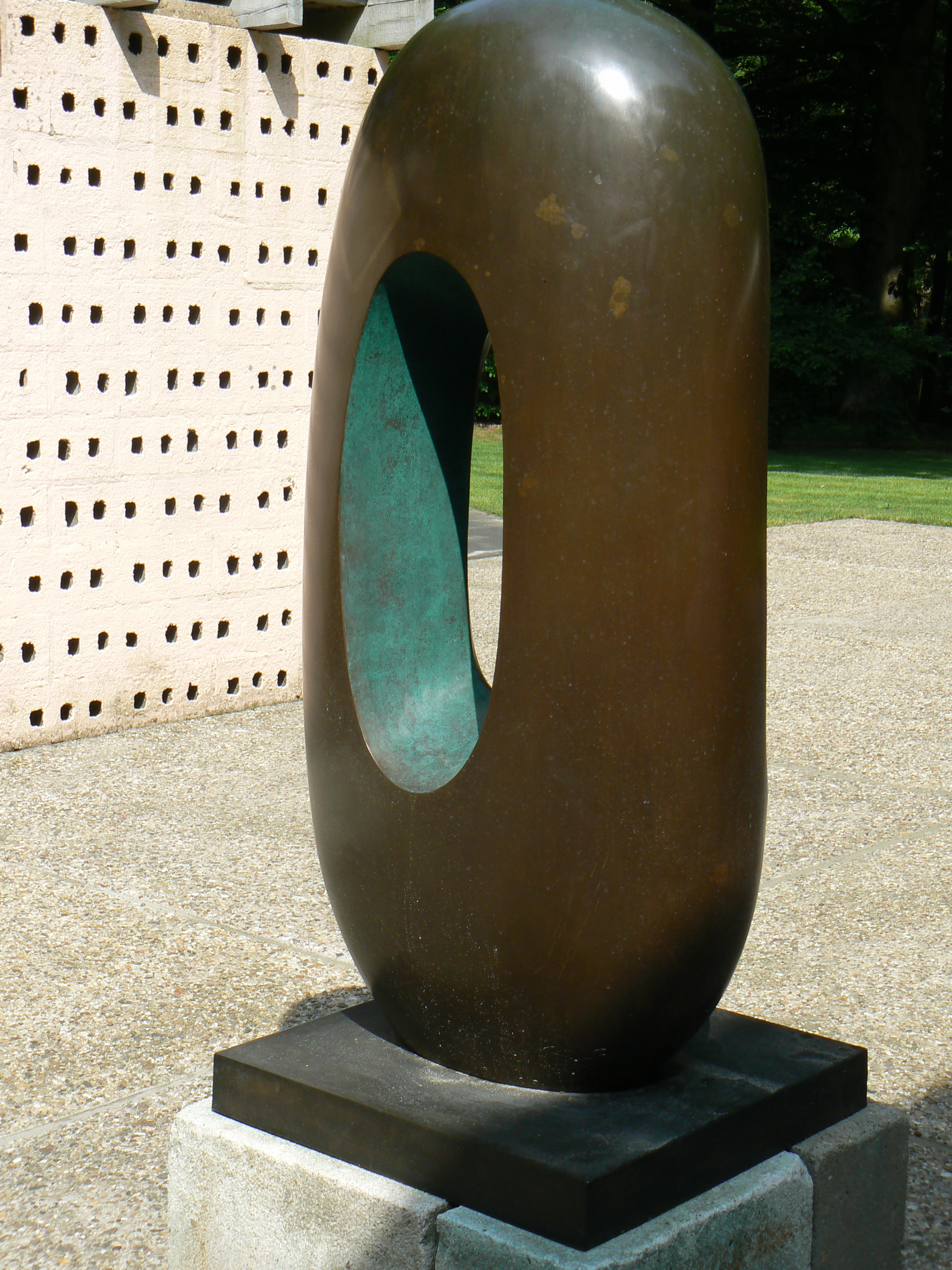
- Elegy III in the Netherlands
- Artist: Barbara Hepworth
- Year: 1966
- Type: bronze
- Dimensions: 130 cm × 64 cm × 48 cm (51 in × 25 in × 19 in)
- Location: various

Elegy III is a 1966 abstract bronze sculpture by Barbara Hepworth.

It is an edition of six. Examples are located at the Kröller-Müller Museum, and Franklin D. Murphy Sculpture Garden, University of California, Los Angeles.
