= National Institute for the Study of Dutch Slavery and its Legacy =

Dutch research institute

Nationaal instituut Nederlands slavernijverleden en erfenis
- Abbreviation: NiNsee
- Formation: 24 June 2002
- Type: Knowledge and research institute
- Purpose: To give a true picture of the past and its legacy about the Dutch slavery
- Headquarters: De Bazel, Amsterdam
- Location: Netherlands
- Director: Urwin Vyent; Antoin Deul (2017)
- Chairman: Linda Nooitmeer (2017-); Antoin Deul (2016-2017); Franc Weerwind, (-2016); Eddy Campbell
- Website: NiNsee.nl

The National Institute for the Study of Dutch Slavery and its Legacy (Dutch: Nationaal Instituut Nederlands Slavernijverleden en Erfenis abbreviated NiNsee) is based in Amsterdam, Netherlands and was established to document the history of Dutch slavery from various perspectives. In 2001, the Dutch government created the institute to research, educate, discuss and process the history of Dutch slavery and its legacy.

== History ==
NiNsee was opened on 1 July 2003 upon the national commemoration of the abolition of slavery 140 years ago.

== Mission ==
The mission of NiNsee is to develop and position itself as the national symbol of the shared legacy of Dutch slavery and the collective future of all Dutch people. NiNsee inventorises the tangible heritage of the slave trade and slavery. This includes plantations, forts and structures that were utilized to house slaves in Suriname, the Netherlands Antilles, Aruba and the west coast of Africa, Ghana. NiNsee also documents the oral history of slavery to help stimulate awareness of the collective history of slavery. NiNsee organizes conferences and workshops to shed light on the history of Dutch slavery and its impact on Dutch society from varied and diverse perspectives, on an international and national level. The institute has the goal of realizing a nuanced and realistic image of Dutch slavery and its legacy.
