= Figure découpée =

Outdoor sculpture by Pablo Picasso

- Dutch: L'oiseau
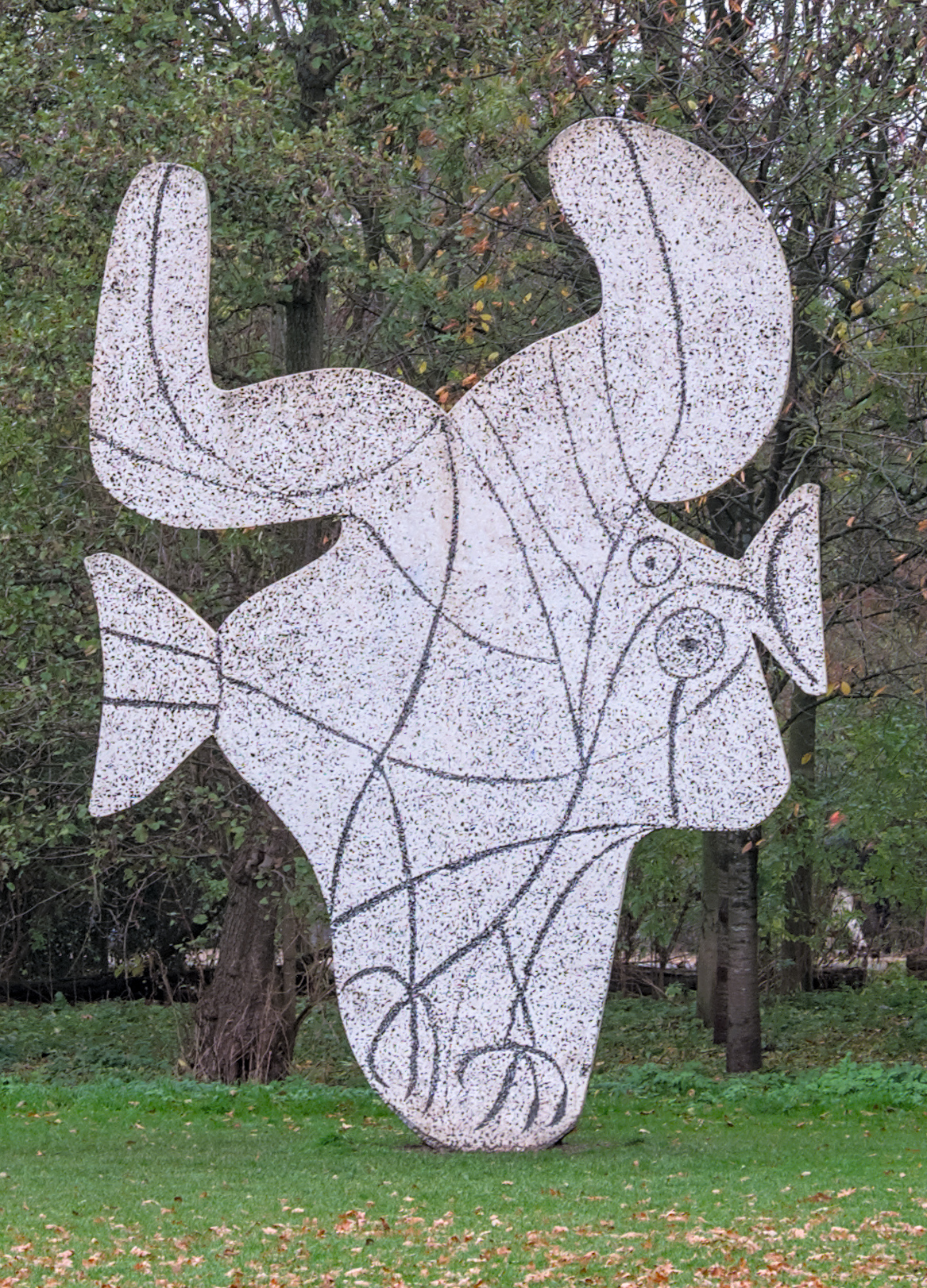
- The Amsterdam Figure découpée in 2013
- Artist: Pablo Picasso.
- Completion date: 1963, 1964, 1965
- Medium: Concrete
- Subject: Abstract
- Location: Cambridge, Massachusetts, United States; Vondelpark, Netherlands, and Helsingborg, Sweden

Figure découpée or L'oiseau (1963, 1964, 1965) is an abstract sculpture by Pablo Picasso: there are a total of three Figure découpée sculptures. There is one located in Vondelpark NL, another on the campus of Massachusetts Institute of Technology in the United States and another is in Helsingborg Sweden. The sculpture is a depiction of a bird, but it is commonly referred to as flat bird, flat fish or fish statue.

== Background ==
Figure découpée is a concrete cut-out sculpture that Pablo Picasso designed in the 1950s. He originally created a series of flying birds and he originally made an example from oil on wood in 1958. The first of the three sculptures was made in 1963 and it stands 3.51 m (11.5 ft), that one was installed at MIT in 1975. The 1963 sculpture was installed in 1975, and is located at the MIT Sloan School of Management, Arthur D. Little Inc., Building (Building E60), Back Courtyard. There is a 1964 version which was cast in the same size and is now in Helsingborg Sweden. In 1965 a third larger version of the piece was cast 5.029 m (16.50 ft) and it was installed at the Vondelpark in the Netherlands.

== Design ==
The interior lines in the drawing make up a bird with head and beak both facing right, and the tail to the left. The feet are below, and above the bird's wings are spread. The overall design is made through a process of concrete engraving. First a wooden frame was constructed and filled with dark rock materials and then covered with concrete. The surface of the concrete was then sandblasted following a template and the blasted away material revealed the dark material in the lines on the surface. Picasso was introduced to the process by Norwegian artist Carl Nesjar.
