= Greive =

Greive is a surname. Notable people with the surname include:

- Alex Greive (born 1999), New Zealand professional footballer
- Bob Greive (1919–2004), American politician
- Bradley Trevor Greive (born 1970), Australian author
- Duncan Greive (born 1979), New Zealand founder and managing editor of online magazine The Spinoff
- Edward Greive (1797–1845), Canadian politician and businessman
- Hermann Greive (1935–1984), German professor of Jewish studies
- Johan Conrad Greive (1837–1891), Dutch painter
- John Greive (1886–1971), Scottish first-class cricketer and cricket administrator, brother of Walter and William
- Petrus Franciscus Greive (1811–1872), Dutch painter and lithographer
- Tallulah Greive (born 1997), Australian-Scottish actress
- Walter Greive (1891–1917), Scottish first-class cricketer, brother of John and William
- William Greive (1888–1916), Scottish first-class cricketer, brother of John and Walter

== See also ==
- George Grieve (1748–1809), or Greive (as he latterly spelled it), was the persecutor of Madame Du Barry
