= Oude Pijp =

- Neighbourhood of Amsterdam
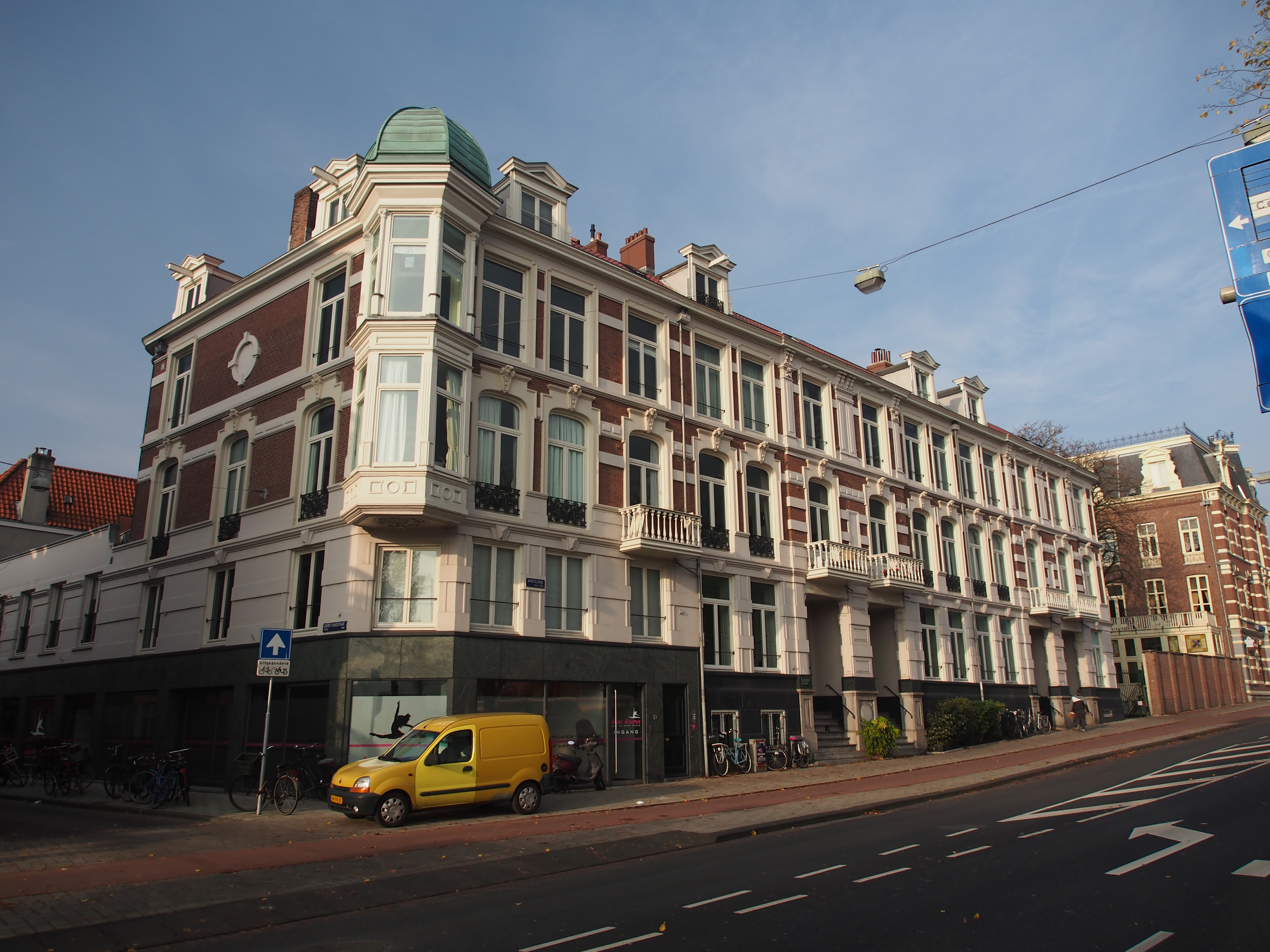
- Govert Flinckstraat, Oude Pijp

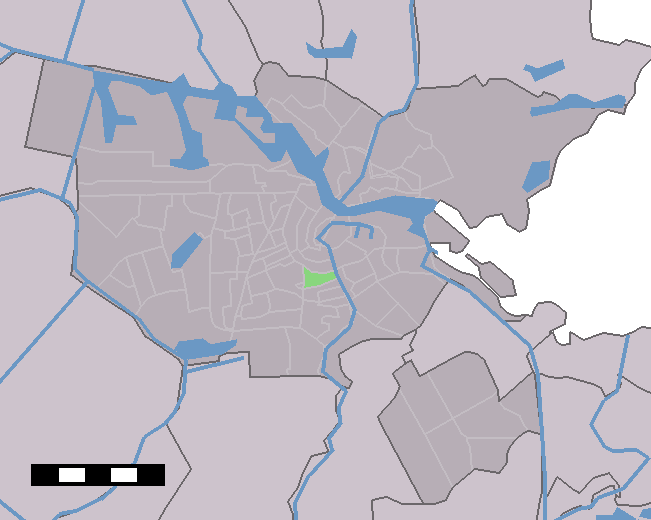
- Location of Oude Pijp (green) in Amsterdam
- Country: Netherlands
- Province: North Holland
- Municipality: Amsterdam
- Borough: Zuid
- Time zone: UTC+1 (CET)

Oude Pijp (Dutch for "Old Pipe"), also known as Noord-Pijp (Dutch for "North-Pipe") is a neighbourhood of Amsterdam, Netherlands located in an urbanised part of the Zuid borough. It had a population of 14,102 in 2011 and an area of 68 hectares. Together with Nieuwe Pijp, Oude Pijp forms De Pijp.

Oude Pijp is bordered by the Boerenwetering (west), the Singelgracht (north), the Amstel (east), and the Ceintuurbaan (south). The Sarphatipark is part of Oude Pijp. Notable locations include the Albert Cuyp Market and the Heineken Experience, a former Heineken brewery, currently an industrial museum.

Several books by notable Dutch authors are set in Oude Pijp in the early 20th century:

- Kamertjeszonde, by Herman Heijermans
- Pijpelijntjes, by Jacob Israël de Haan
- Jeugd in De Pijp, Vrijmoedige herinneringen, by Piet Bakker
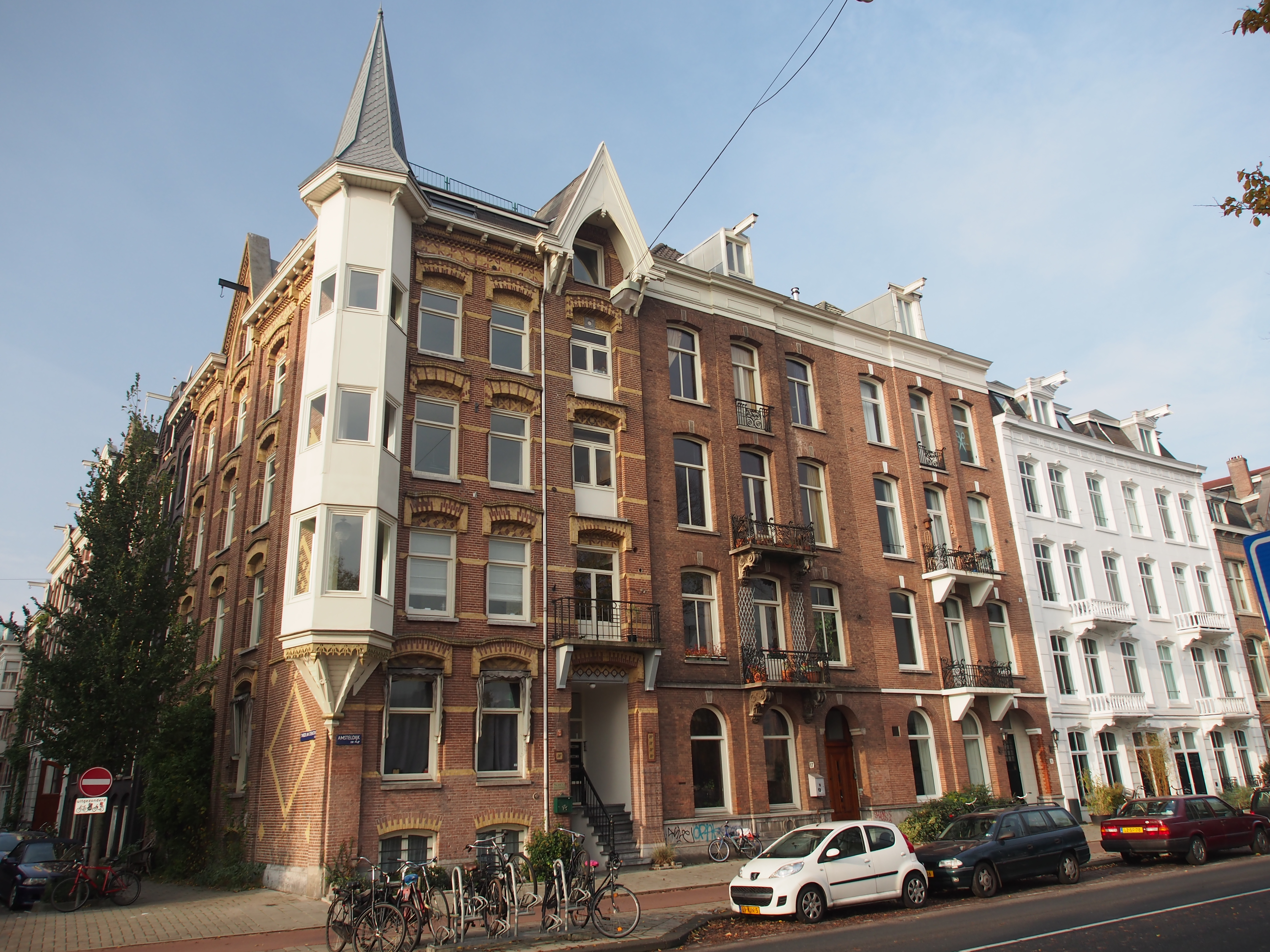
Corner between the Amsteldijk and Tweede Jan Steenstraat

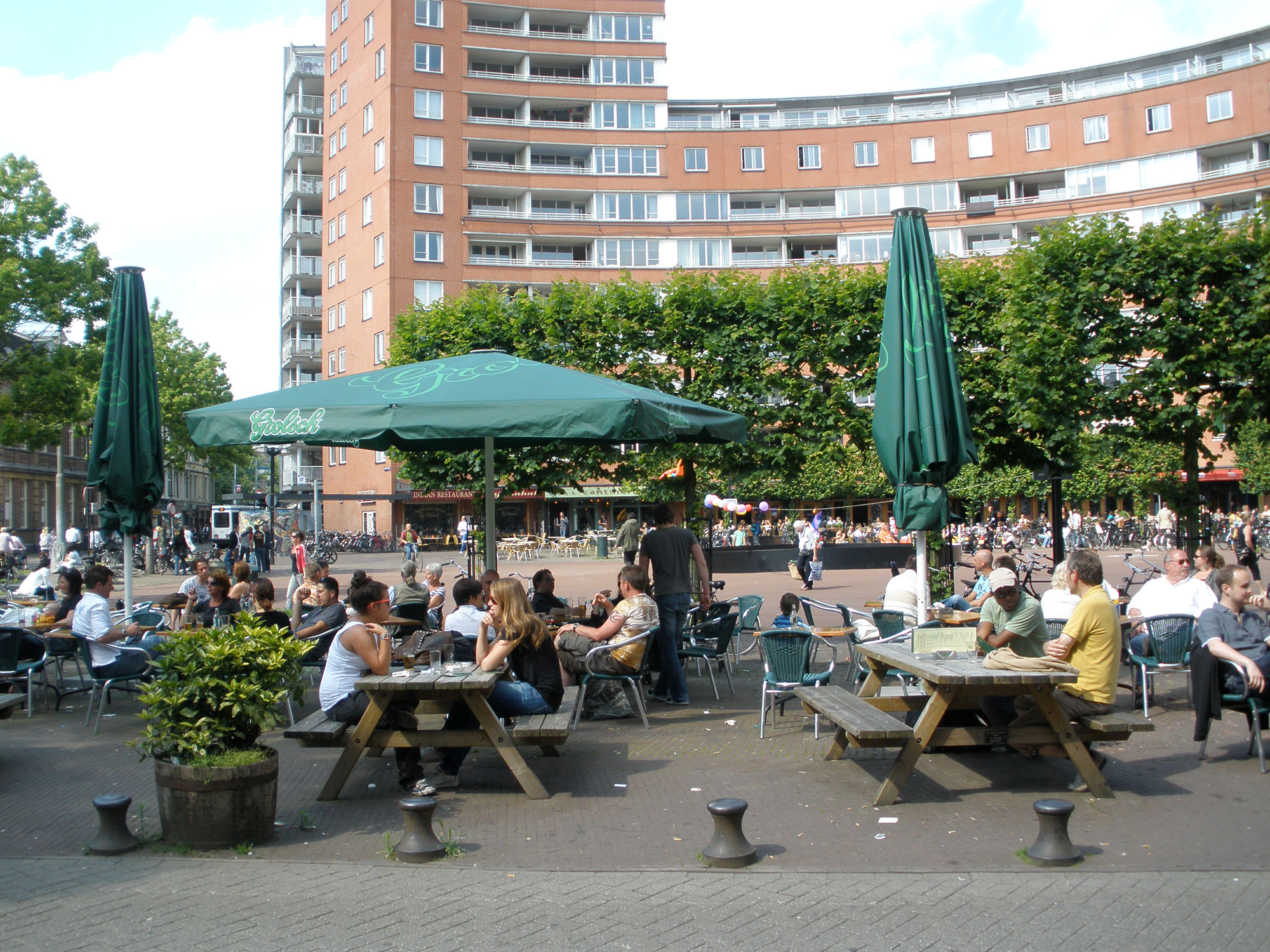
Marie Heinekenplein

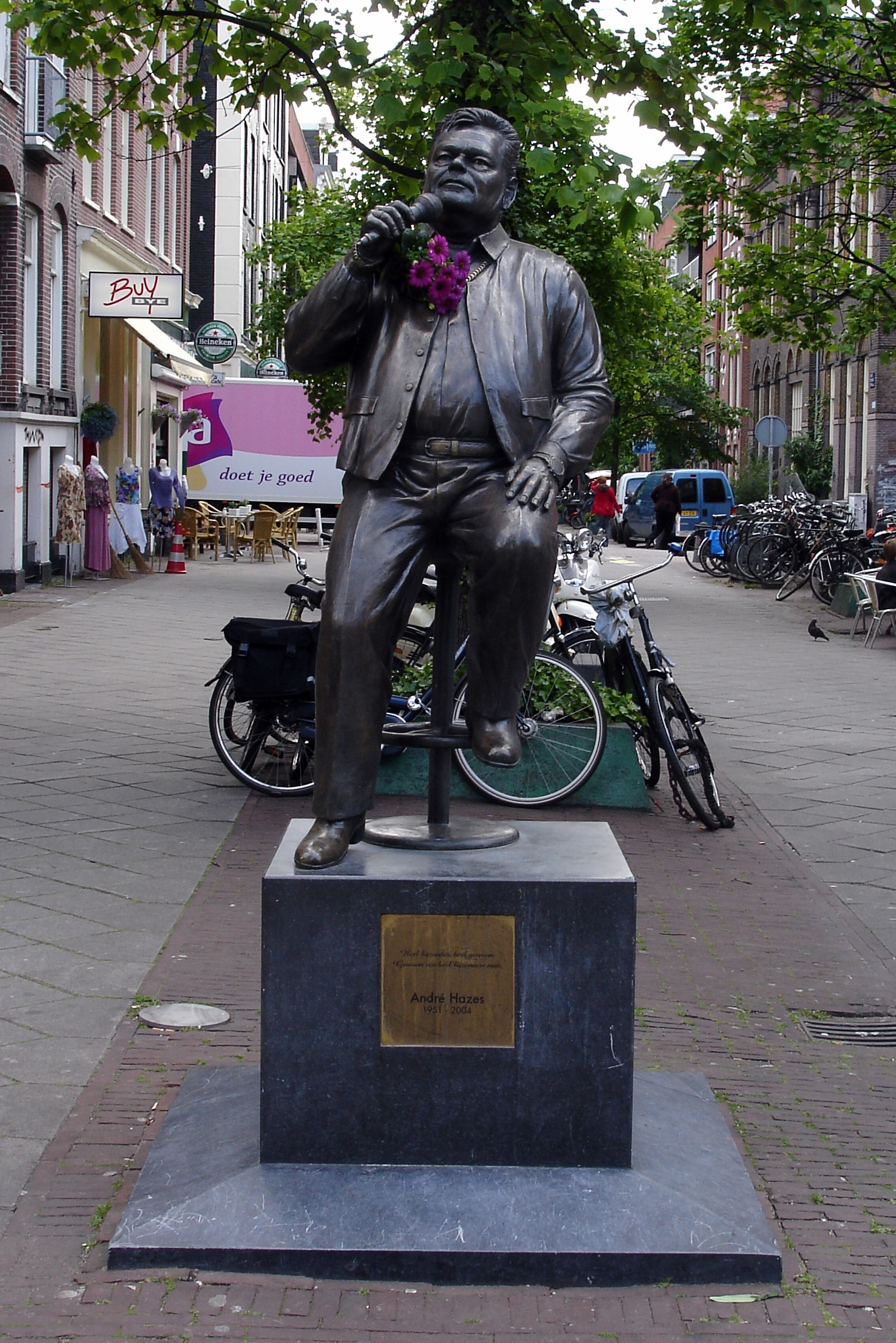
Statue of André Hazes

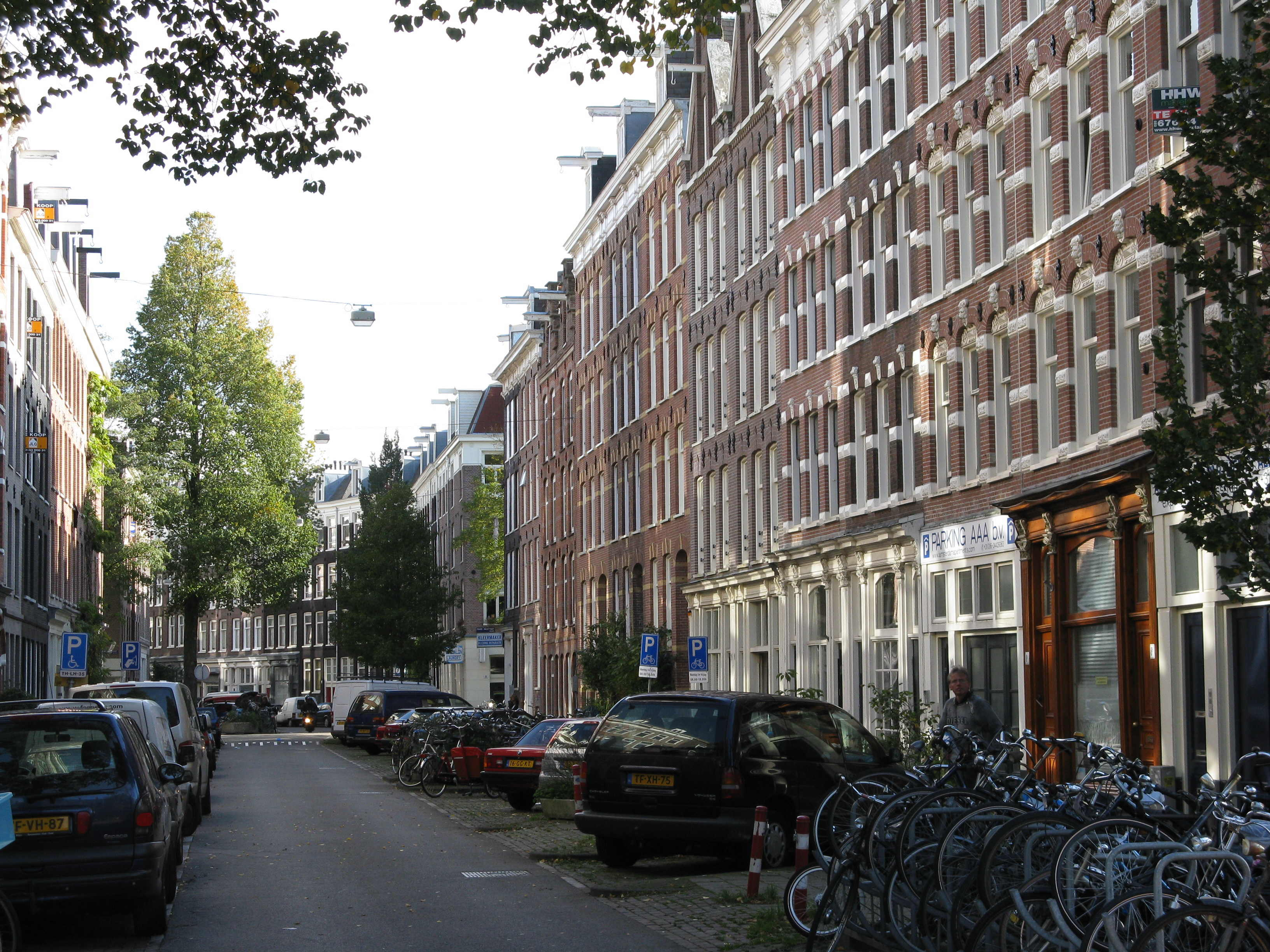
Gerard Dousstraat
