= Marie Heinekenplein =

Square in Amsterdam, Netherlands

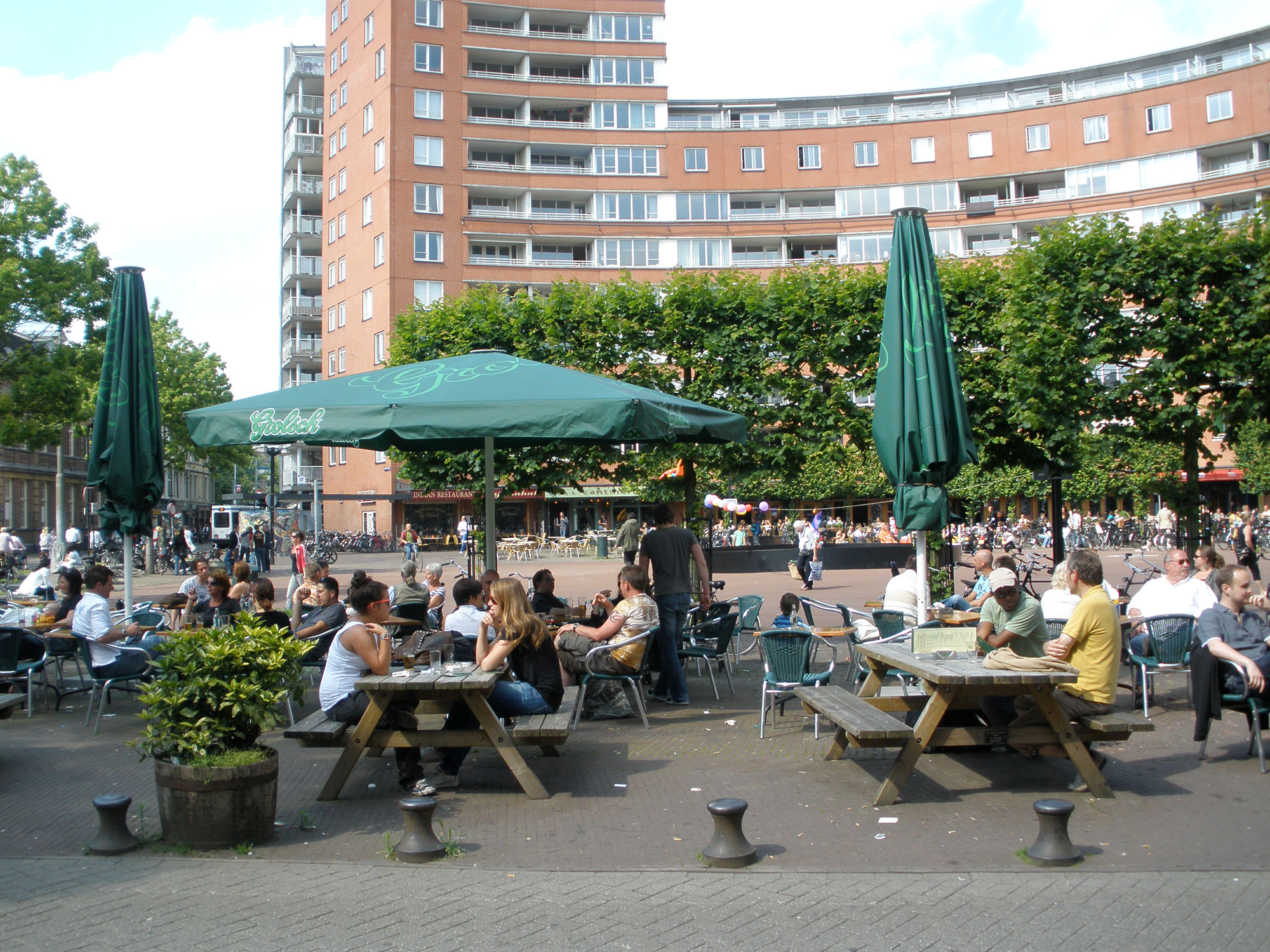
- Marie Heinekenplein in 2009

- Location within Amsterdam
- Namesake: Marie Heineken
- Location: Zuid, Amsterdam, Netherlands
- Nearest metro station: De Pijp
- Coordinates: 52°21′25″N 4°53′28″E

The Marie Heinekenplein (English: Marie Heineken Square) is a square in Amsterdam, Netherlands, popularly known as the Heinekenplein. The circle-shaped square is used for various events, such as a book market and an open-air cinema.

Marie Heinekenplein was constructed in the early 1990s. It lies just outside the city centre, in the neighbourhood of De Pijp, along the street Ferdinand Bolstraat. The Quellijnstraat runs along the southern edge of the square. Tram lines 16 and 24 have a stop near the square.

Along the Marie Heinekenplein are a number of bars and cafés. The square is lined with café terraces. Between the square and the Stadhouderskade street is the former Heineken brewery, now a popular tourist attraction known as the Heineken Experience. Along the northern side of the square is a modern apartment building incorporating a supermarket and other shops at ground level. One of the three restaurants of renowned Chinese restaurant chain Nam Kee is located along the square.

Originally the area was part of the Heineken brewery complex. In 1988, most of the brewery was demolished, and in 1993, construction of the square was started. The name of the square was the source of much debate in Amsterdam. Originally it was supposed to be named after Nelson Mandela, but the plan was scrapped after Winnie Mandela was convicted in 1991 of kidnapping and being an accessory to assault in connection with the death of 14-year-old James Seipei. Local street-naming rules do not allow a street to be named after someone who is still alive or a company. This also prevented the square to be named "Heinekenplein". The square is located in an area of De Pijp where streets are normally named after Dutch painters. A compromise was struck by naming the square after a niece of the Heineken founder Gerard Adriaan Heineken, painter Marie Heineken (1844-1930).

== Sources ==
- Amsterdam city archives (Dutch)
- PvdA Amsterdam (Dutch)
