= Marie Heineken =

Dutch artist (1844-1930)

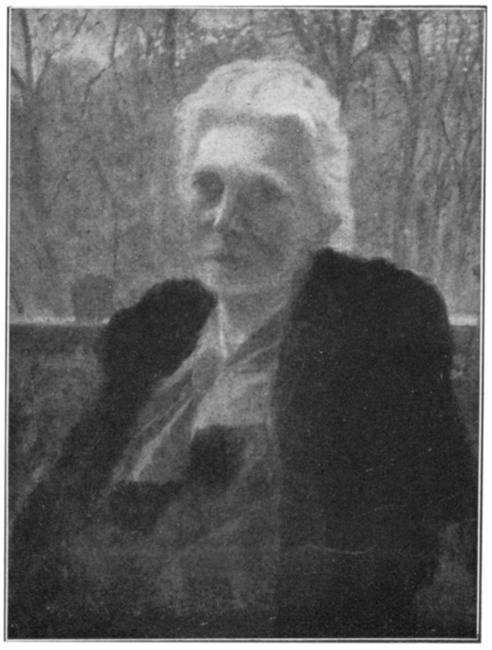
- Self portrait of Marie Heineken (1930)
- Born: Marie Henriëtte Heineken; 8 June 1844; Amsterdam, Netherlands
- Died: 1 March 1930 (aged 85); Amsterdam, Netherlands
- Known for: Painting
- Movement: Impressionism

Marie Henriëtte Heineken (8 June 1844 – 1 March 1930) was a Dutch painter mainly known for flower still lifes and watercolours. Her paintings are characterised as impressionist.

== Biography ==
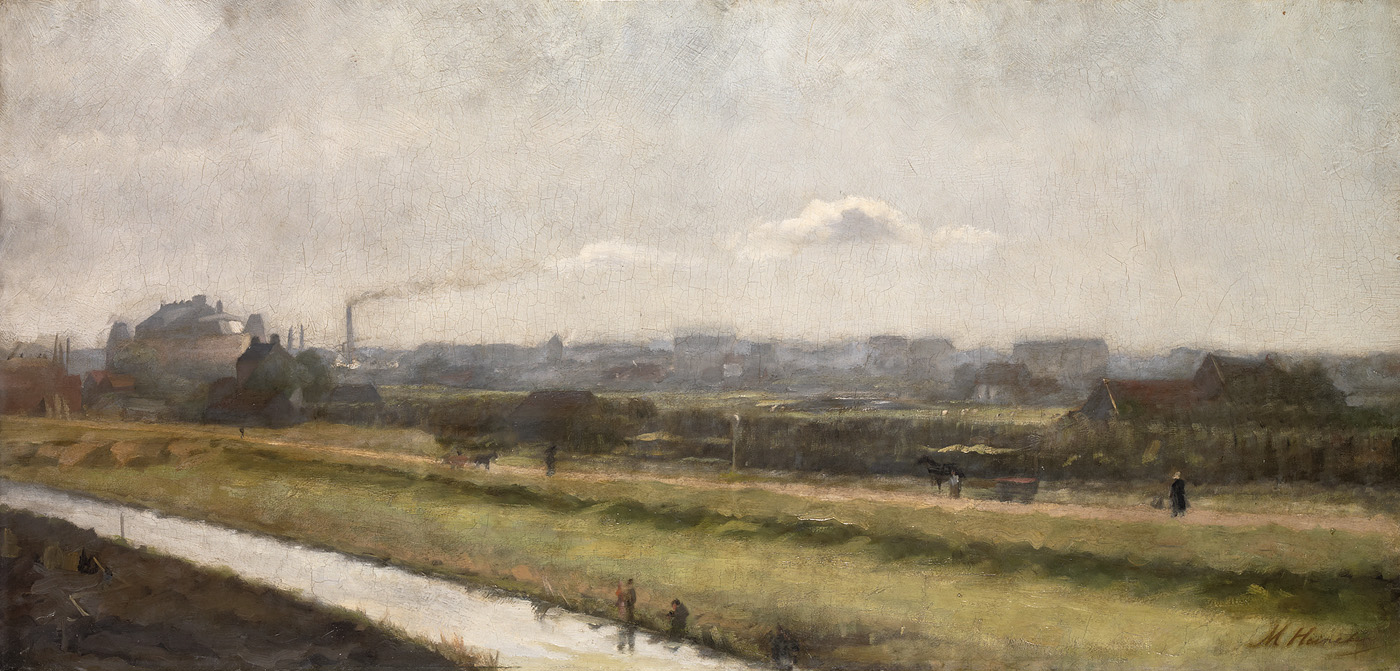
The southern outskirts of Amsterdam

Marie Heineken was born on 8 June 1844 on the Korte Prinsengracht in Amsterdam. She was a cousin of the founder of Heineken beer, Gerard Adriaan Heineken. During a holiday when she was still a child, she met a painter, and became fascinated with painting. Her earliest work dates from 1859, and she would remain an active painter for the rest of her life.

At the age of 24, she enlisted at the Rijksakademie van beeldende kunsten and was taught by August Allebé. She was later taught by Petrus Franciscus Greive. Heineken painted with watercolour and pastel. The emphasis was on flower still lifes, however she has also painted landscapes, cityscapes and portraits. For most of her life, she was active in Amsterdam except for 1891 to 1897 when she lived in Nieuwer-Amstel. She was a member of Arti et Amicitiae, and Guild of Saint Luke. From 1883 onwards, she had several exhibitions in Amsterdam. A part of her work is on display at the Amsterdam Museum. Heineken was a personal friend of Betsy Repelius. When Repelius died in 1921, she left her studio and all equipment to Heineken.

Heineken died on 1 May 1930, at the age of 85 in Amsterdam. In 1994, the Marie Heinekenplein was named after her. The naming is slightly controversial, because the square is located on the former Heineken brewery. Streets are not allowed to be named after living people or companies, and therefore, some people suggest that her name was used as a reference to the former brewery.
