= Gerard Doustraat Synagogue =

Synagogue in Amsterdam, Netherlands

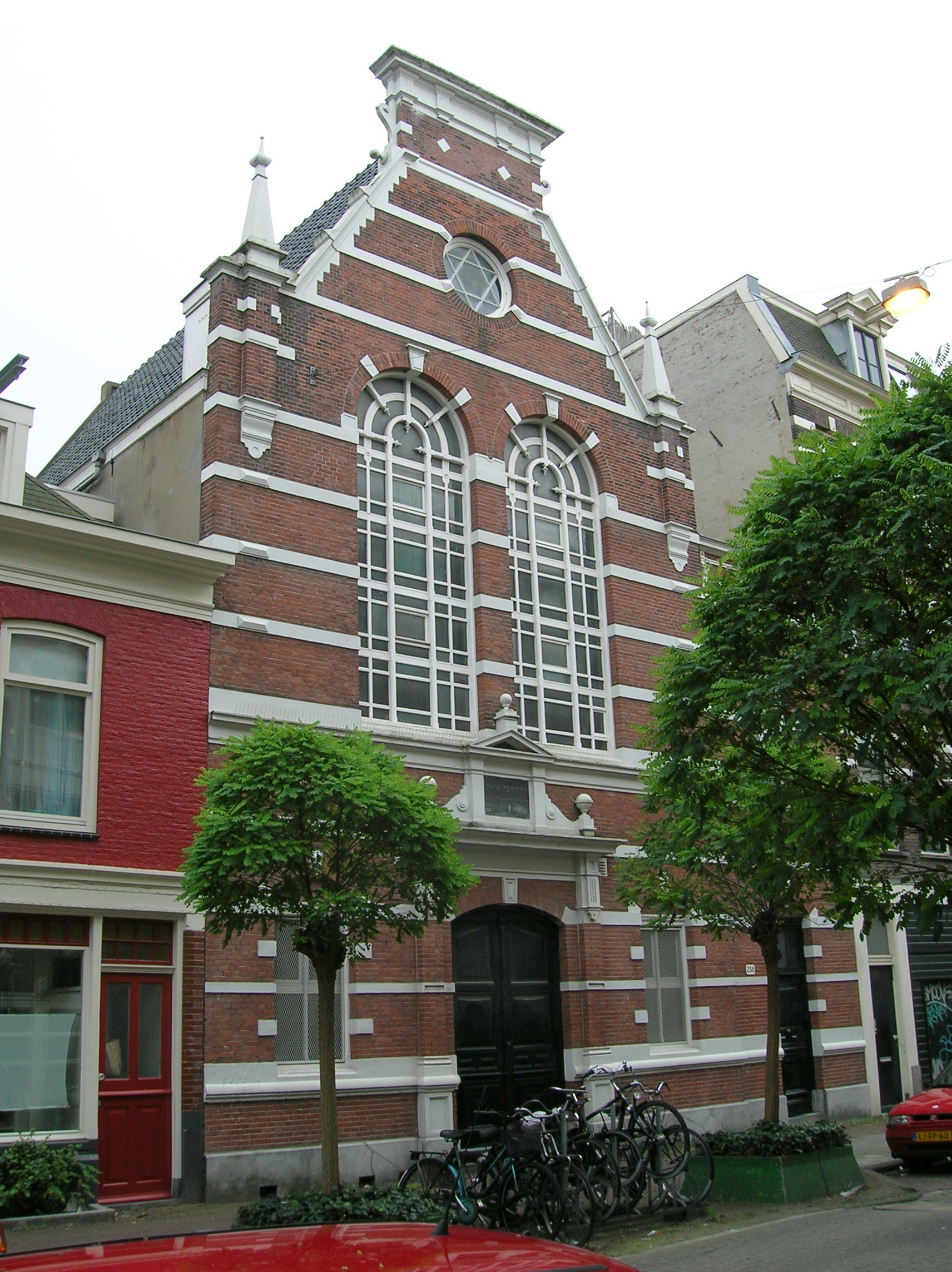
- The synagogue in 2005

- Location of the synagogue in Amsterdam

Religion
- Affiliation: Orthodox Judaism
- Rite: Nusach Ashkenaz
- Ecclesiastical or organizational status: Synagogue
- Status: Active

Location
- Location: Gerard Doustraat 238, de Pijp, South Amsterdam, North Holland
- Country: The Netherlands
- Interactive map of Gerard Doustraat Synagogue
- Coordinates: 52°21′25″N 4°53′52″E

Architecture
- Architect: E. M. Rood
- Type: Synagogue architecture
- Style: Renaissance Revival
- Completed: 1892

Specifications
- Capacity: 320 seats
- Materials: Brick

Website
- gerard-dou.nl (in Dutch)

The Gerard Doustraat Synagogue is an Orthodox Jewish congregation and synagogue, located at Gerard Doustraat 238, in the de Pijp neighborhood of South Amsterdam, in North Holland, the Netherlands. Designed by architect E. M. Rood in the Renaissance Revival style, the synagogue was completed in 1892.

The synagogue offers space for 250 men and 70 women. The building was completely renovated and refurbished in the 1990s. The synagogue hardly stands out from the residential buildings on the street, allowing services to continue until 1943, despite German occupation. The synagogue was the official residence of Chief Rabbi Justus Tal until his death in 1954.

== See also ==
- History of the Jews in the Netherlands
- List of synagogues in the Netherlands
