= Ferdinand Bolstraat =

Street in Amsterdam, the Netherlands

Coordinates: 52°21′09″N 4°53′28″E

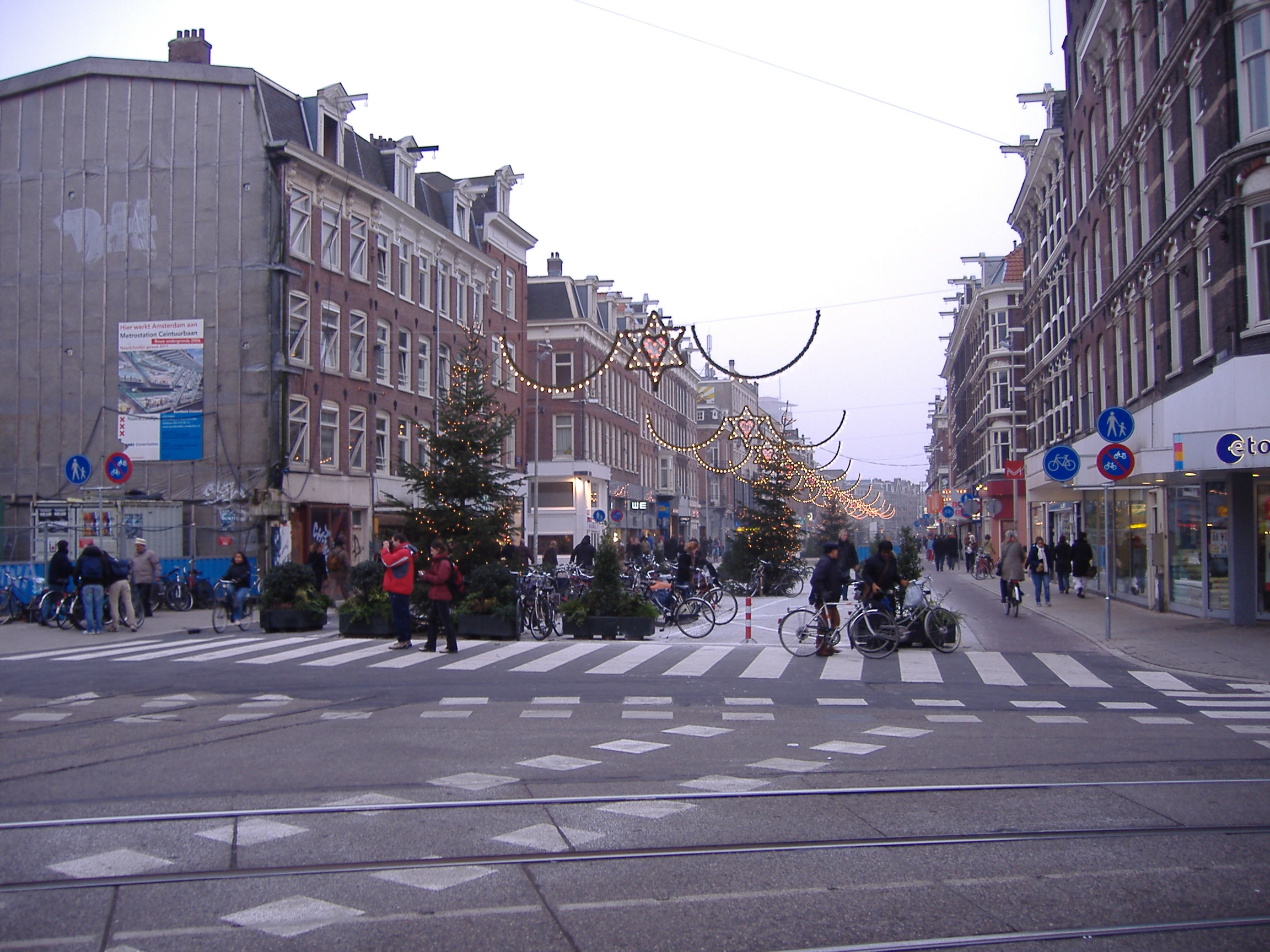
The Ferdinand Bolstraat in 2007. The street was closed off to car traffic due to the construction of De Pijp metro station below street level.

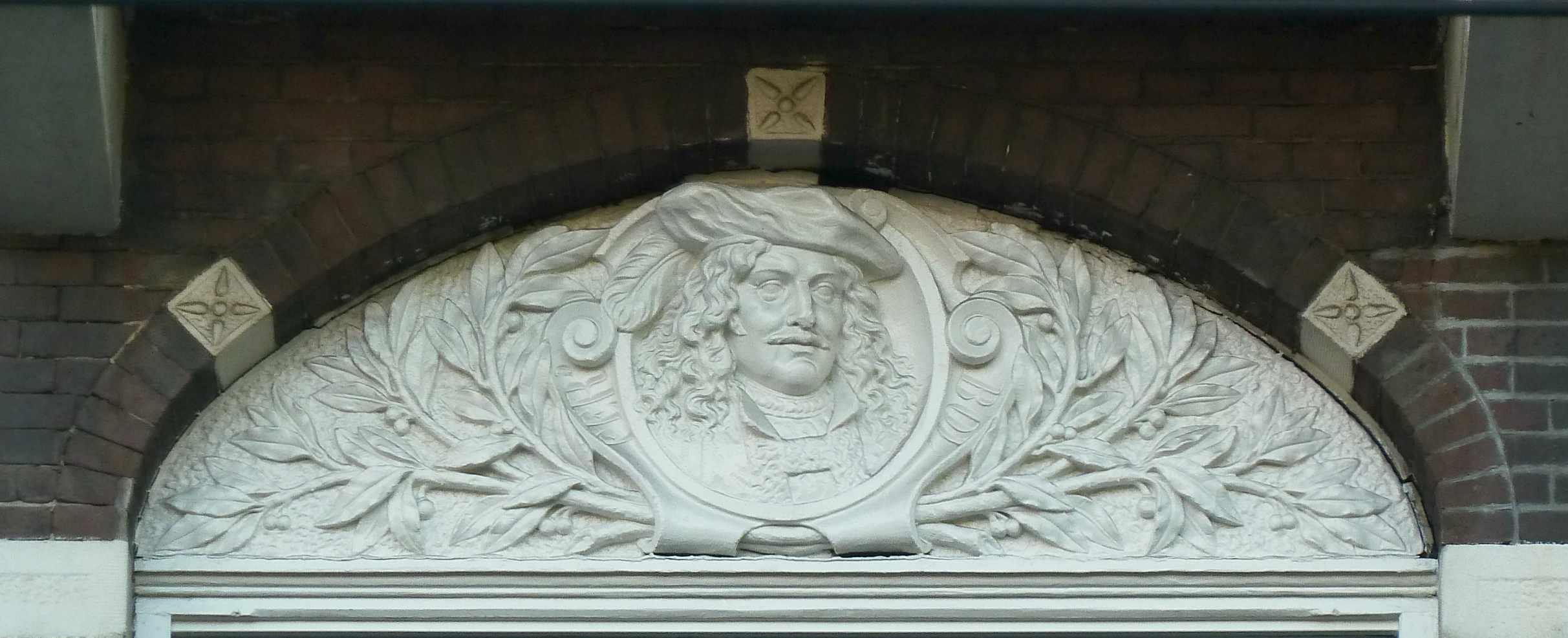
Relief above a window at Ferdinand Bolstraat 49 depicting Ferdinand Bol, after whom the street is named

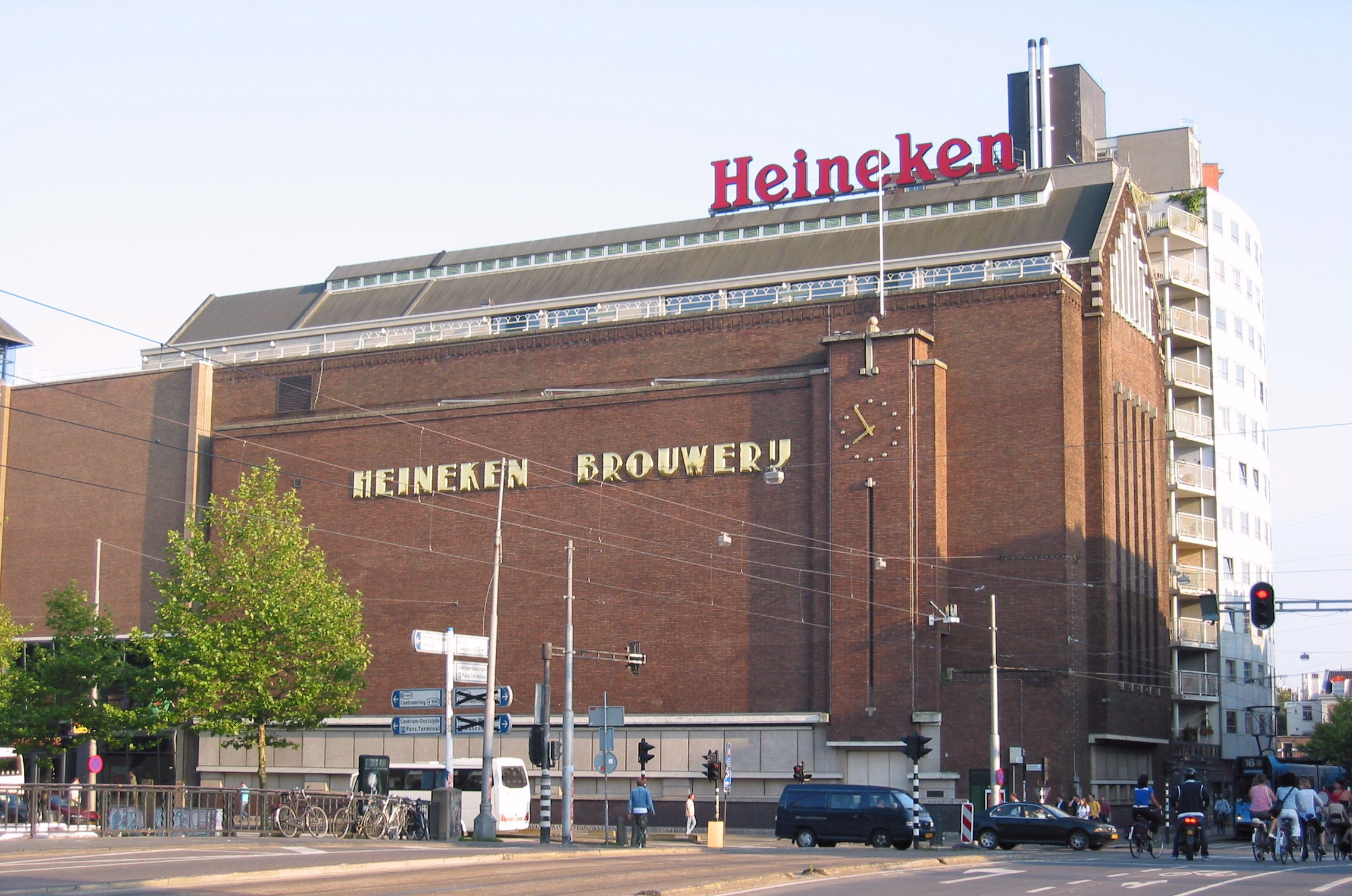
The original Heineken brewery at the northern end of the street

The Ferdinand Bolstraat is a street south of the city centre of Amsterdam, named after the artist Ferdinand Bol in 1872.

== Description ==
The Ferdinand Bolstraat has traditionally been, and continues to be, primarily a shopping street. It is a major artery of the neighbourhood De Pijp. The street is an extension of the Vijzelstraat which runs south from Muntplein square in the centre of Amsterdam. The street runs more or less north–south from the park and traffic circle Weteringplantsoen to the Amstelkanaal canal and Churchilllaan boulevard. From there, the street continues southward as the Scheldestraat towards Europaplein square, where the RAI convention centre is located.

The Ferdinand Bolstraat intersects with Albert Cuypstraat, where the popular daily street market Albert Cuyp Market is located. It also intersects the Ceintuurbaan, a traffic artery running roughly west–east from Boerenwetering canal to the Amstel river.

Well-known buildings include the original Heineken brewery built in 1867 (now home to the Heineken Experience) at the northern end of the street, and the five-star, 23-floor Okura Hotel, a 78 metres tall building which, when completed in 1971, was the second-tallest in the city of Amsterdam.

== History ==
In 1875, a bridge replaced the ferry over the Singelgracht canal, connecting the Ferdinand Bolstraat to the city centre. After part of the municipality of Nieuwer-Amstel was annexed by Amsterdam in 1896, the street was gradually extended further south, towards the Amstelkanaal canal.

In the 1960s, the city government planned to demolish the street and replace it with a broad boulevard. However, these plans were abandoned after protests from local activists, such as the politician Jan Schaefer.

After the RAI convention centre moved from its original location on Ferdinand Bolstraat to the current complex on Europaplein in the 1960s, and the RAI building was demolished in 1976, there were plans to replace it with an opera house, as Berlage had intended. However, these plans were also abandoned after protests from local residents, and the Stopera (a combined opera house and city hall) was built instead at a different location in Amsterdam.

In 2008 the council of the borough of Oud-Zuid decided that the southern section of Ferdinand Bolstraat, between Albert Cuypstraat and Ceintuurbaan, will remain a car-free pedestrian area even after completion of the metro station (expected in 2017). No decision has been made yet on the northern section of the street.

In 2017 a 140-metre section of the tramline which serves the street, between Saenredamstraat and Quellijnstraat, was made single-track.

De Pijp metro station, a station of the July 2018 North/South Line (Line 52) of the Amsterdam Metro, has an entrance on Ferdinand Bolstraat. Because the street is quite narrow, the station's platforms were not built adjacent to one another but one below the other. Tram line 24 runs through the Ferdinand Bolstraat on street level.

== Trivia ==
FEBO, a well-known chain of fast-food restaurants in the Netherlands, was named after the Ferdinand Bolstraat. The chain started in 1941 as a bakery called Maison FEBO. However, this bakery was not actually located on Ferdinand Bolstraat, although it was originally intended to be located there.

== Sources ==
- FerdinandBolStraat.com (Dutch, archived)
- VVD Oud-Zuid: Opportunities for the Ferdinand Bolstraat (PDF, archived)
