= Hein Kever =

Dutch genre painter (1854–1922)

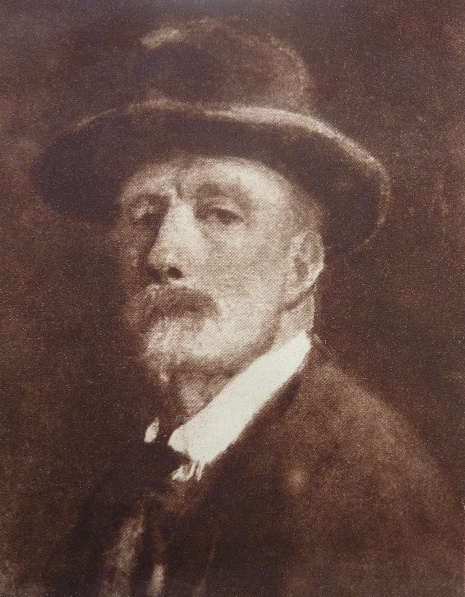
Self-portrait (c.1910)

Jacob Simon Hendrik Kever, known as Hein (19 June 1854 in Amsterdam – 29 April 1922 in Amsterdam) was a Dutch genre and still-life painter; associated with the Laren School.

== Biography ==
He was born into a wealthy family. He showed little ability for practical pursuits, but his mother was a good friend of Jozef Israëls and was able to obtain him positions in the workshops of some well-known lithographers, notably Petrus Franciscus Greive. After Greive's death in 1872, he studied with his nephew, Johan Conrad Greive, then set himself up as an independent painter in Eemnes, where he often worked en plein aire. He sometimes painted interiors without figures, to avoid the cost of models.

In 1878, he took a course at the Royal Academy of Fine Arts in Antwerp with Charles Verlat. He then settled in Blaricum, but kept a small apartment in Oosterpark, where he spent the winters.

Except for short periods in Nunspeet and Brabant, he travelled little. In 1887, he was married and bought a house in Laren, near the "Villa Ariette" of Anton Mauve, who he greatly admired. When Mauve came to visit, he would often hide what he was working on, claiming that it had already been sold and shipped, because he was afraid that Mauve would not like it.

He is considered to be a member of the Laren School. Although mostly known for simple, peasant interiors, he also did landscapes and portraits. His canvases brightened up later in life, when he appears to have become more confident of success. A street in Laren is named after him.

== Selected paintings ==
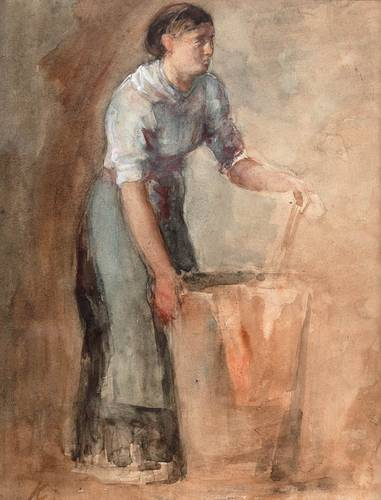
The Washerwoman

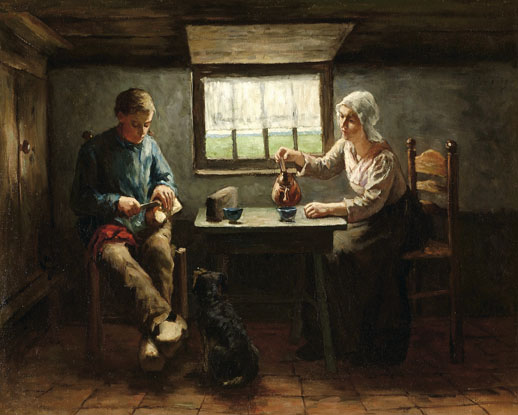
Tea Time at the Farmhouse

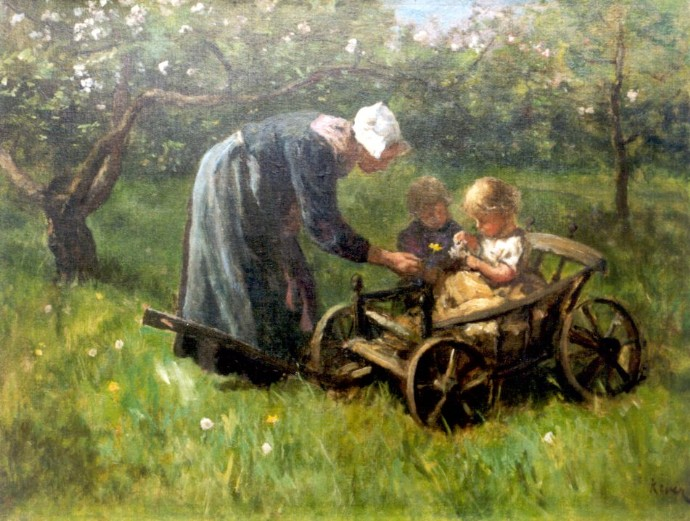
Apple Orchard

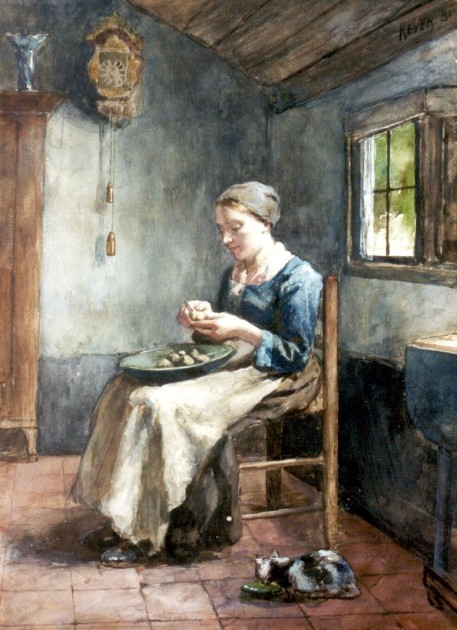
Peeling Potatoes
