= Selkirk High School =

Coordinates: 55.5491°N 2.8339°W

Location
- Hillside Terrace; Selkirk, Scottish Borders, TD7 4EW; Scotland

Information
- Type: Secondary School
- Motto: Trusty and Leal
- Established: 1897
- Local authority: Scottish Borders Council
- Rector: Jamie Bryson
- Gender: Mixed
- Age: 11 to 18
- School years: S1-S6
- Website: selkirkhighschool.org.uk

Selkirk High School is a high school in Selkirk, Scotland, which serves the town and its surrounding area including the Ettrick and Yarrow valleys and the villages of Midlem and Lilliesleaf. The school's motto is 'Trusty and Leal', taken from the common riding song 'Up wi' the Souters'.

== Notable former pupils ==
Notable former pupils include:

- Mungo Park (10 September 1771 – 1806), explorer of the African continent
- Gideon Lang - Australian pastoralist and parliamentarian
- Bobby Johnstone (1921 – 2001), Scotland international football player, member of the Hibernian legendary Famous Five forward line
- Sandy McMahon (1871 – 1916), Scotland international football player, Celtic's eighth all-time top goal scorer.
- Andrew Lang (31 March 1844 – 20 July 1912), poet, novelist, literary critic and contributor to anthropology
- James Marr Brydone, (1779 – 1866), surgeon who sighted the French fleet, signalling the beginning of the Battle of Trafalgar
- James Brown (J.B. Selkirk) (1832–1904), poet and essayist
- Peter Blake b.8 December 1951, film and television actor
- Rae Hendrie b.1977, television actress
- Tom Scott, artist
- Dennis Soga (1917–2003), cricketer
- John Rutherford b.1955 Scotland International rugby player and British and Irish Lion. He won 42 caps at fly-half for his country, at the time a record in that position.
- Frightened Rabbit, indie rock band
- Jim Hume b.1962, Politician, Member of The Scottish Parliament (MSP) for South Scotland, 2007–2016.
- John Greive (1886-1971), cricketer and president of the Scottish Cricket Union.
- Walter Greive (1891–1917), cricketer
- William Greive (1888–1916), cricketer
