= Dennis Soga =

South African cricketer and rugby union player

Personal information
- Full name: Dennis Soga
- Born: 13 May 1917; Elliotdale, Cape Province, South Africa
- Died: 22 September 2003 (aged 86); East London, Eastern Cape, South Africa
- Batting: Right-handed
- Bowling: Right-arm off break

Domestic team information
- Years: Team
- 1936: Scotland

Career statistics
Competition	First-class
Matches	1
Runs scored	25
Batting average	12.50
100s/50s	–/–
Top score	24
Catches/stumpings	–/–
- Source: Cricinfo, 6 November 2022

Dennis William Soga (13 May 1917 — 22 September 2003) was a South African first-class cricketer and rugby union player.

The son of the physician Alexander Robert Bogue Soga, he was born in May 1917 at Elliotdale, Cape Province. With family connections to Scotland, Soga was educated there at Selkirk High School. Playing his club cricket for Selkirk, Soga was selected to play for the Scottish cricket team against Ireland at Edinburgh in 1936. Batting from the middle order, he was dismissed in the Scottish first innings for a single run by James Graham, while in their second innings he was dismissed for 24 runs by Eddie Ingram. In addition to playing cricket, Soga also played rugby union for Selkirk RFC. Soga later returned to South Africa, where he became a dentist. He died there at East London in September 2003. His great-grandfather was Tiyo Soga, the first black South African to be ordained.
