= Betsy Repelius =

Dutch painter

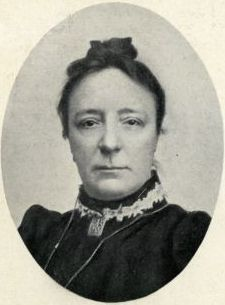
Betsy Repelius (date unknown)

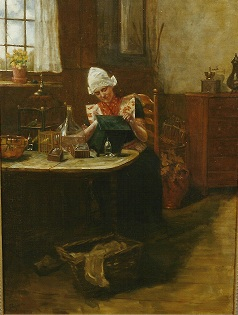
Young Woman in Traditional Costume.

Johanna Elisabeth Repelius, known as Betsy (31 January 1848 in Amsterdam – 23 January 1921 in Amsterdam) was a Dutch painter and watercolorist who specialized in simple, one-figure, genre scenes.

== Biography ==
She was the youngest of eight children born to a wealthy merchant family, engaged primarily in the cheese trade. Against her father's wishes, she decided to become an artist and took her first lessons from the history painter Petrus Franciscus Greive. Later, she studied with Karel Frans Philippeau, who was known for his popular genre scenes. From 1873 to 1876, she was enrolled at the Rijksakademie, where her primary instructor was August Allebé. She also studied watercolor painting with Nicolaas van der Waay, who also became close friend. In 1875, she became a member of Arti et Amicitiae and, after 1878, was a regular participant in their exhibitions.

In 1889, thanks to her inherited wealth, she was able to build a home designed by the prominent architect, Joseph Cuypers. It had a studio in the attic that might be described as an early loft and the family coat-of-arms was incorporated into the façade with tile panels. Later, she hired Piet Mondriaan, then a young, aspiring artist, to paint allegorical scenes and putti on the ceiling. She would often invite people in off the street to pose for her. It is notable that, in most of her works, the figures are looking down or off to the side.

She remained unmarried, but had a wide circle of close artistic friends that included Thérèse Schwartze and Lizzy Ansingh. She exchanged letters for two decades with the Dutch ophthalmologist Marie du Saar.

Because of her wealth, she was sometimes criticized as being a mere dilettante. She donated to charity quite freely, especially to organizations for the blind. In her will, she left significant amounts to all her friends. The flower painter Marie Heineken, niece of the brewer Gerard Adriaan Heineken, received the contents of her studio.
