= Albert Cuyp Market =

Street market in Amsterdam

Coordinates: 52°21′21.5″N 4°53′43.3″E

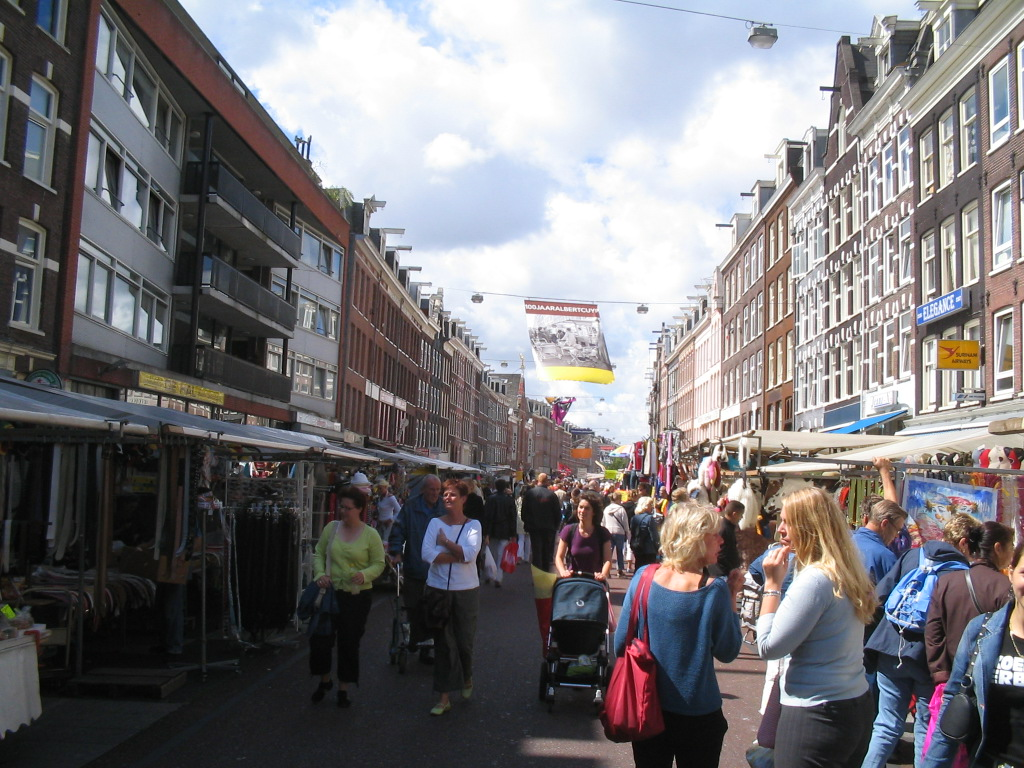
The Albert Cuyp market

The Albert Cuyp Market is a street market in Amsterdam, The Netherlands, on the Albert Cuypstraat between Ferdinand Bolstraat and Van Woustraat, in the De Pijp area of the Oud-Zuid district of the city. The street and market are named for Albert Cuyp, a painter from the 17th century.

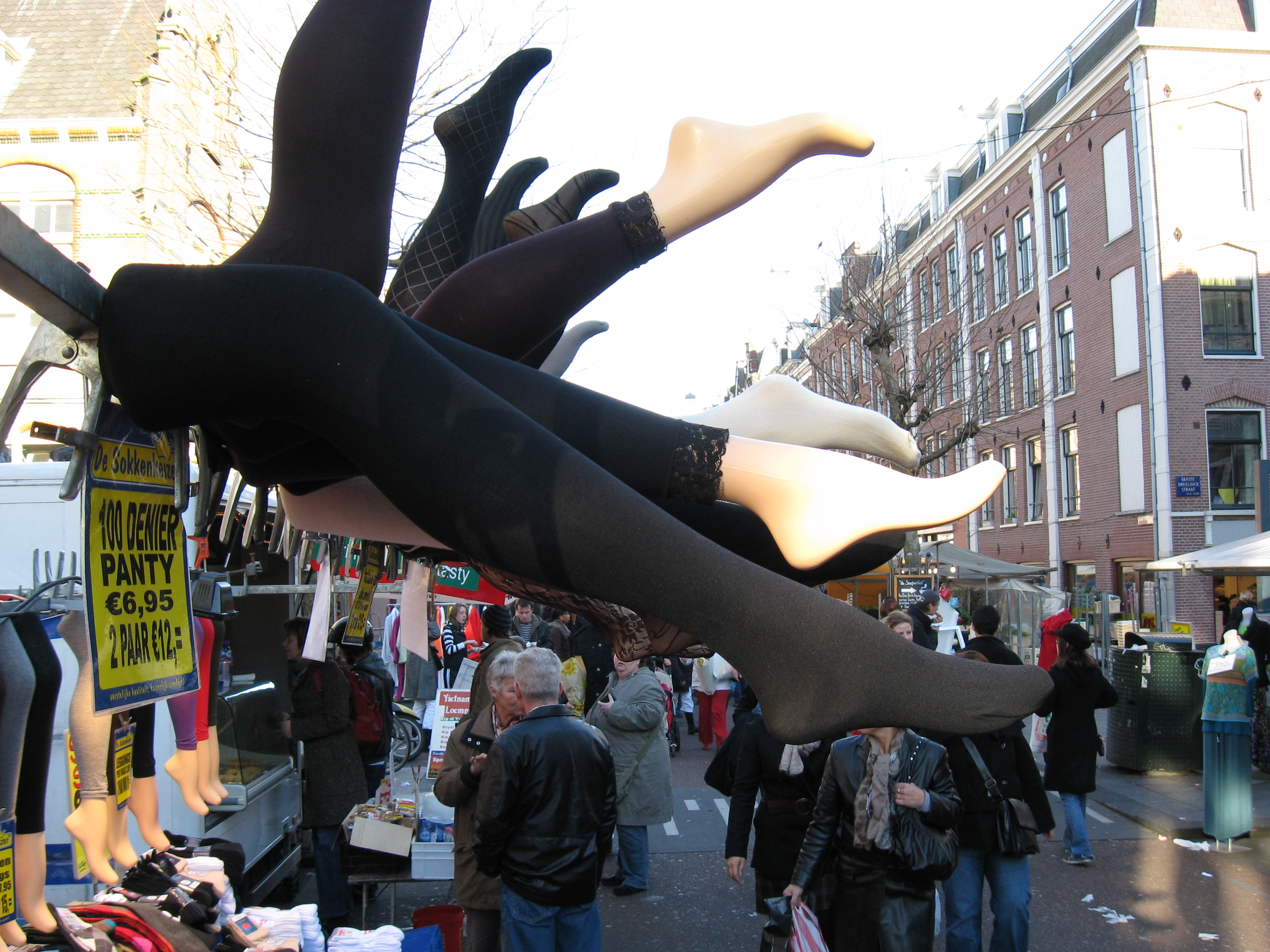
A shop in the market

The market began as an ad hoc collection of street traders and pushcarts. By the beginning of the 20th century, this had become so chaotic that in 1905, the city government decided to set up a market, at first only held on Saturday evenings. In 1912, the market became a daytime market open six days a week. Originally the street was accessible while the market was taking place, but more recently the street has been completely closed off to traffic during market hours.

The product selection at the market varies from the traditional range of vegetables, fruit and fish to clothing and even cameras. There are many products sold that are of interest to the city's residents of Surinamese, Antillean, Turkish, and Moroccan origin, giving the market and neighbourhood a strong multicultural feel.

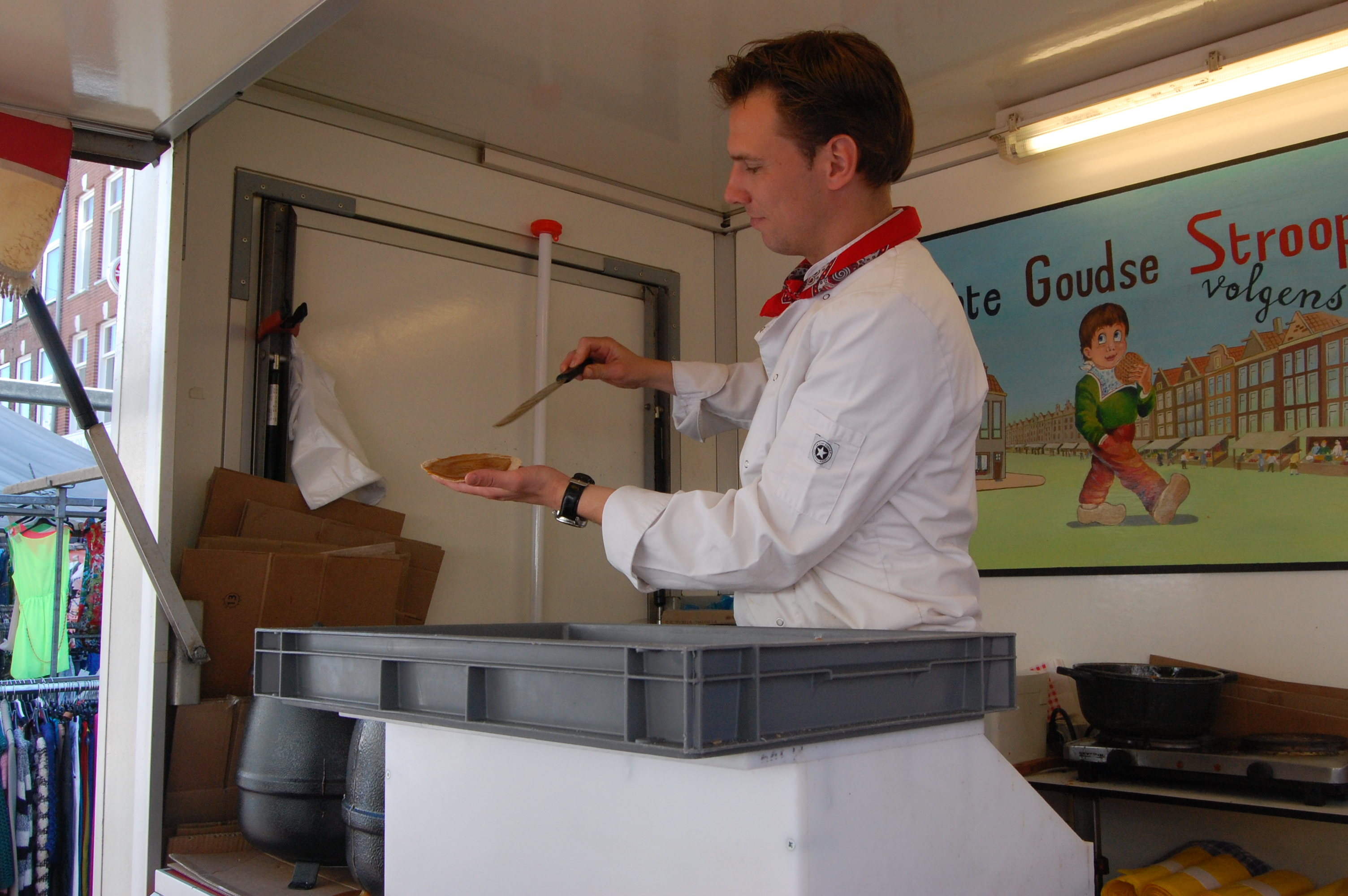
Stroopwafel making at Albert Cuyp Market

The market is the busiest in all of the Netherlands and claims to be the largest daytime market in Europe. It is also an important tourist attraction. The famous Dutch Stroopwafels are prepared fresh here.

Also popular are the many ethnic restaurants and bars that are found behind the market stalls.

In 2005, a statue of the Dutch Levenslied-singer André Hazes was unveiled on the Albert Cuypstraat, with symbolic meaning as the street was the place where his talent as street artist was discovered by John Kraaijkamp Sr.
