= Hermann Greive =

Hermann Greive (7 April 1935 - 25 January 1984) was a West German professor of Jewish studies. He was shot dead by a former student with mental issues.

== Life ==
Hermann Greive was born in Walstedde, a small town in the Warendorf district, a short distance to the east of Münster. He received his doctorate in theology in 1967 and his habilitation (higher academic qualification) from Cologne University.

The focus of his research was on the history of Judaism and its philosophy on the context of research on antisemitism. He was a co-producer of the seven-volume published edition of diaries and letters of Theodor Herzl.

By 1973 he was teaching as a professor at Cologne University's Martin Buber Institute for Jewish Studies, where most of the students were actually, like him, non-Jewish.

== Death ==
On 25 January 1984, while Greive was holding a seminar with eleven students, the door opened and Sabine S. Gehlhaar entered the room with an old-fashioned pistol and shot him in the head. He died the next day. A younger colleague, Hans-Georg von Mutius, alerted by the shot, ran across from a nearby seminar room to investigate. He was confronted by Gehlhaar who shot him, but he was only injured and he managed to overpower the mentally disturbed assassin. The police were called and Gehlhaar, a former student at the institute, was taken away.
