= John Greive =

Scottish cricketer and British Army soldier

Personal information
- Full name: John Greive
- Born: 26 June 1886; Howden Farm, Selkirkshire, Scotland
- Died: 7 June 1971 (aged 84); Selkirk, Selkirkshire, Scotland
- Batting: Right-handed
- Bowling: Right-arm medium
- Relatives: Walter Greive (brother); William Greive (brother)

Domestic team information
- Years: Team
- 1911–1926: Scotland

Career statistics
Competition	First-class
Matches	5
Runs scored	208
Batting average	26.00
100s/50s	–/3
Top score	58
Balls bowled	54
Wickets	0
Bowling average	–
5 wickets in innings	–
10 wickets in match	–
Best bowling	–
Catches/stumpings	6/–
- Source: Cricinfo, 27 March 2021

John Greive (26 June 1886 – 7 June 1971) was a Scottish first-class cricketer and cricket administrator.

Greive was born at Howden Farm in Selkirkshire in June 1886 to James Greive, a farmer, and his wife Margaret. He was educated at Selkirk High School. Greive was well known in club cricket in the Scottish Borders region, playing for Selkirk Cricket Club. He set a record in Border cricket in 1920, by scoring 1,011 runs in the season. In fifty years of club cricket he made thirty centuries. Following success at club level, Greive was selected to play first-class cricket for Scotland in 1911, making two appearances against Ireland and the touring Indians at Glasgow and Galashiels respectively. Greive fought in the First World War and survived the conflict. His brothers, William and Walter, who had also played first-class cricket for Scotland, were both killed in the war. Following the war, he made three further first-class appearances for Scotland between 1920 and 1926, playing twice against Ireland and once against Surrey. In five first-class matches, Greive scored 208 runs with a highest score of 58. A farmer by profession, For Selkirk, he had made more centuries in Scottish cricket than any other Borders cricketer by 1937. Grieve was president of the Scottish Cricket Union in 1935. Outside of cricket, he played curling for Selkirk. A farmer by profession, he died at Selkirk in June 1971.
