= William Greive =

Scottish cricketer and British Army soldier

Personal information
- Full name: William Greive
- Born: 1 March 1888; Howden Farm, Selkirkshire, Scotland
- Died: 17 July 1916 (aged 28); Kemmel, West Flanders, Belgium
- Batting: Right-handed
- Bowling: Unknown
- Relatives: John Greive (brother); Walter Greive (brother)

Domestic team information
- Years: Team
- 1910: Scotland

Career statistics
Competition	First-class
Matches	1
Runs scored	6
Batting average	3.00
100s/50s	–/–
Top score	6
Balls bowled	24
Wickets	0
Bowling average	–
5 wickets in innings	–
10 wickets in match	–
Best bowling	–
Catches/stumpings	–/–
- Source: Cricinfo, 27 March 2021

William Greive (1 March 1888 – 17 July 1916) was a Scottish first-class cricketer and British Army soldier.

Greive was born at Howden Farm in Selkirkshire in March 1888 to James Greive, a farmer, and his wife Margaret. He was educated at Selkirk High School. Greive was well known in club cricket in the Scottish Borders region, playing for Selkirk Cricket Club. Considered one of the strongest cricketers in the Scottish Borders, he was selected to play in a first-class match for Scotland against Ireland at Dublin in 1910. He batted twice in the match and was dismissed for scores of 6 and 0 by William Harrington and Gus Kelly respectively. As a bowler he bowled 21 wicket-less overs.

Greive served in the First World War as a lance corporal in the Lothians and Border Horse. He was wounded in action at Siege Farm near Kemmel on 17 July 1916, when a German shell stuck the observers' building which he was in and subsequently set it alight. He was recovered from the burning building, but succumbed to his wounds shortly after. He was buried in the Bailleul Communal Cemetery. Both of his brothers, John and Walter, played first-class cricket; Walter was killed in action in 1917, while John survived the war and later became president of the Scottish Cricket Union.
