= Walter Greive =

Scottish cricketer and British Army soldier

Personal information
- Full name: Walter Greive
- Born: 10 February 1891; Selkirk, Selkirkshire, Scotland
- Died: 1 April 1917 (aged 26); Arras, Pas-de-Calais, France
- Batting: Right-handed
- Bowling: Right-arm medium
- Relatives: John Greive (brother); William Greive (brother)

Domestic team information
- Years: Team
- 1912–1914: Scotland

Career statistics
Competition	First-class
Matches	2
Runs scored	25
Batting average	6.25
100s/50s	–/–
Top score	18
Balls bowled	90
Wickets	0
Bowling average	–
5 wickets in innings	–
10 wickets in match	–
Best bowling	–
Catches/stumpings	–/–
- Source: Cricinfo, 27 March 2021

Walter Greive (10 February 1891 – 1 April 1917) was a Scottish first-class cricketer and British Army soldier.

Greive was born at Selkirk in February 1891 to James Greive, a farmer. He was educated at Selkirk High School, where he played for the cricket XI. He was well known in club cricket in the Scottish Borders region, playing for Selkirk Cricket Club. He was described as "a batsman of great ability and force, and a good change bowler". Following success at club level, Greive was selected to play first-class cricket for Scotland against the touring Australians at Edinburgh in 1912, He batted twice in the match and was dismissed for scores of 18 and 6 by Roy Minnett and Gerry Hazlitt respectively. He made a second first-class appearance in 1914, against Ireland at Dublin. In this match he made scores of 1 and 0, being dismissed in both innings' by Budge Meldon. Prior to the First World War, he was associated with his father in managing the family farm.

Greive served in the First World War as a private in the 17th Battalion Highland Light Infantry. He was killed in action near Arras on 1 April 1917, days prior to the Battle of Arras. Both of his brothers, John and William, played first-class cricket; William was killed in action in 1916, while John survived the war and later became president of the Scottish Cricket Union.
