= De Pijp metro station =

Station on the North–South Line of the Amsterdam Metro

De Pijp
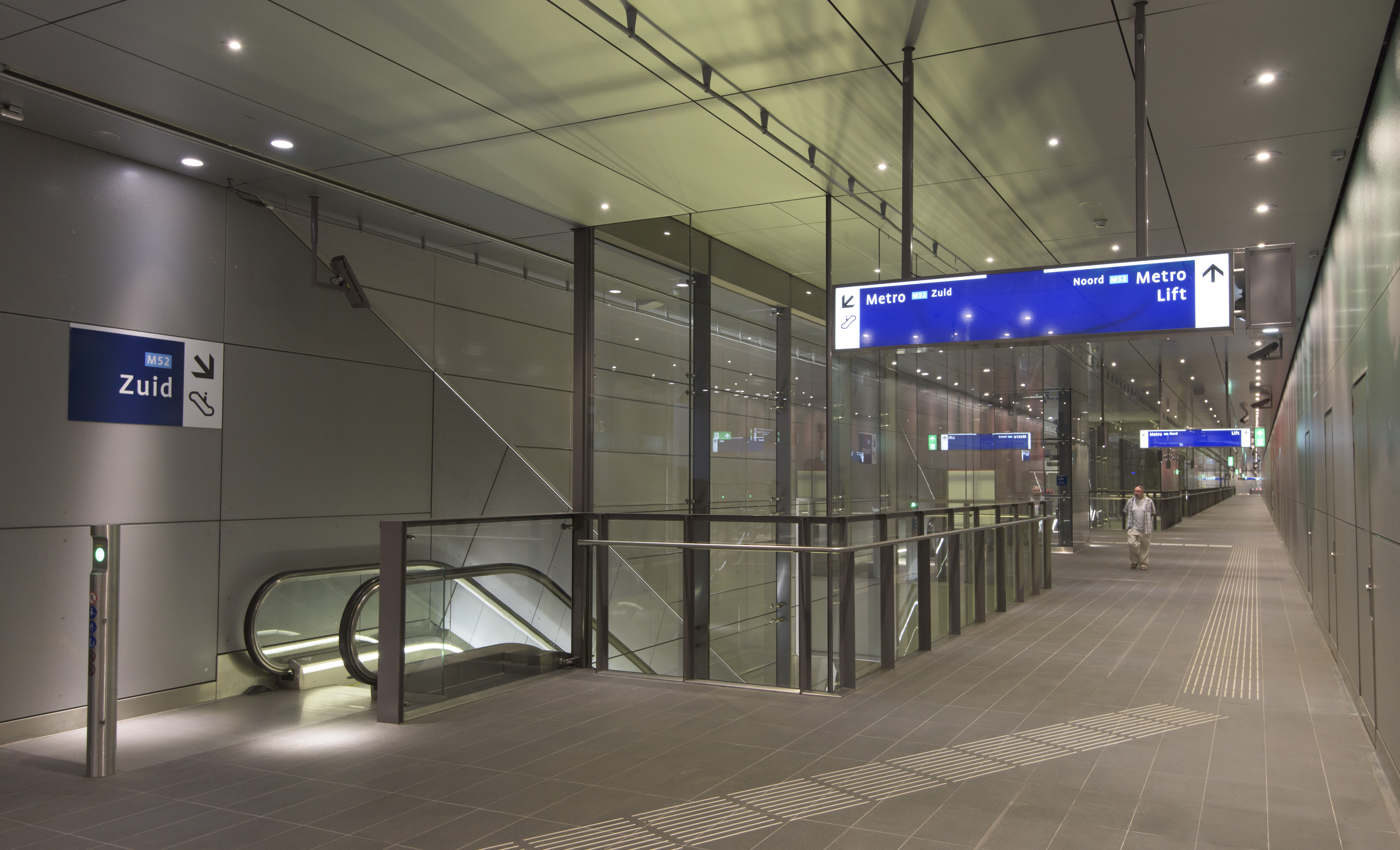
- De Pijp Station as of August 2018

General information
- Location: Oude Pijp, Amsterdam, Netherlands
- Coordinates: 52°21′13″N 4°53′26″E
- Owner: City of Amsterdam
- Operator: GVB
- Line: 52 (Metro)
- Platforms: 2 split platforms (1 on each level)
- Tracks: 2 (1 on each level)

Construction
- Structure type: Underground
- Platform levels: 2

Other information
- Station code: DPP
- Fare zone: 5700 (Centrum)

History
- Opened: 22 July 2018

Services
| Preceding station | Amsterdam Metro | Following station |
|---|---|---|
| Vijzelgracht towards Noord | Line 52 | Europaplein towards Station Zuid |
Tram services
| Preceding station | Amsterdam Tram | Following station |
|---|---|---|
| Tweede Van der Helststraat towards Flevopark | Line 3 | Roelof Hartplein towards Zoutkeetsgracht |
| Van Hilligaertstraat towards Centraal Station | Line 12 | Roelof Hartplein towards Amstelstation |
| Marie Heinekenplein towards Frederiksplein | Line 24 | Roelof Hartplein towards De Boelelaan/VU |
Location
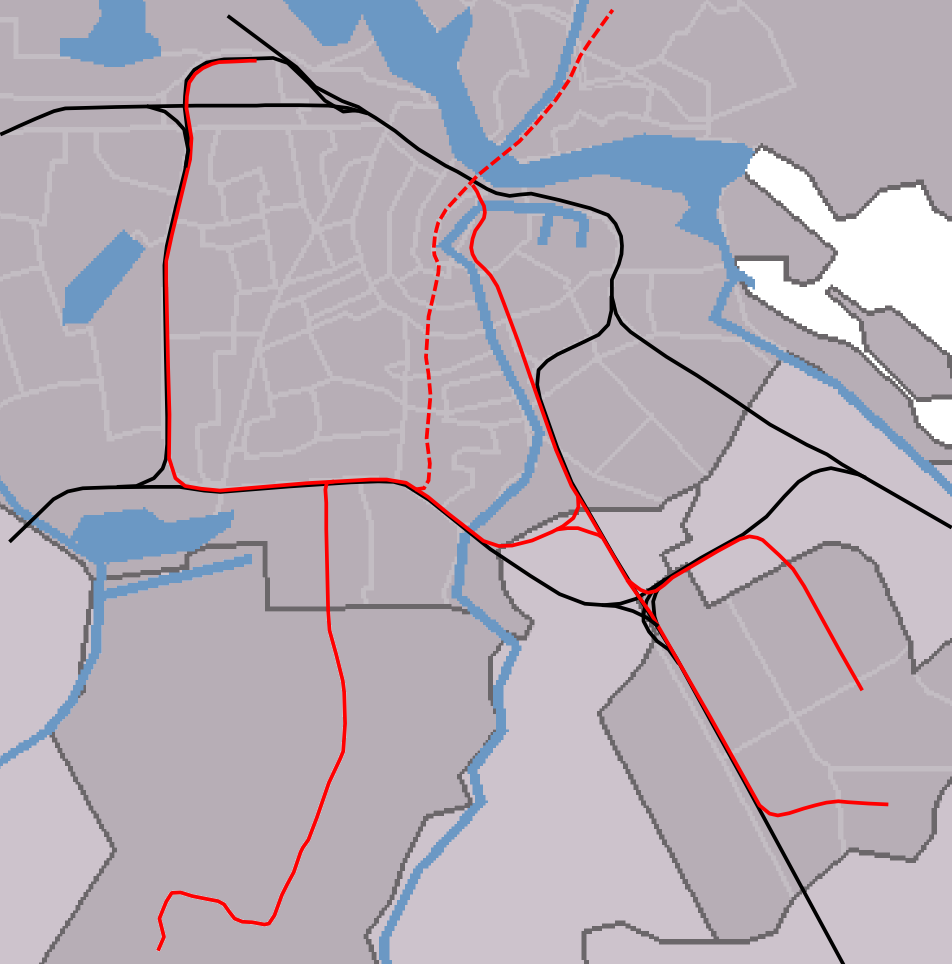
- Location within metro van Amsterdam

De Pijp metro station (Dutch: Station De Pijp) is a station on the Route 52 (North–South Line) of the Amsterdam Metro in Amsterdam, Netherlands. It was opened on 22 July 2018. Prior to March 2012, this station was known as the Ceintuurbaan. De Pijp is an underground station situated in the Oude Pijp neighbourhood of the borough of Amsterdam-Zuid (Amsterdam South). The station is expected to handle around 18,000 passengers and arrivals per day.

== History ==
The station, designed by Benthem Crouwel Architects, is situated beneath the Ferdinand Bolstraat in the De Pijp neighbourhood. Because of the narrow constraints of the site location, between the foundations of adjoining buildings, the station has two levels, with a platform on each level. Each platform is 125 metres long and 5.3 metres wide (3 meters at its narrowest points). There are ten escalators (five per platform) as well as lifts to the mezzanine level. The lower level platform with southbound services to Zuid is 26.5 meters below street level, while the upper level platform with northbound services to Noord is 16.5 meters below street level. This makes De Pijp station the deepest station on the Noord/Zuidlijn and the deepest metro station in the Netherlands.

In May 2013, a municipal advisory committee selected artwork by Argentinian artist Amalia Pica for this station. It is a multicolored painting that will run the entire span of the wall of the mezzanine level.

The station has two entrances, one at Albert Cuypstraat and Ferdinand Bolstraat and one at Ceintuurbaan and Ferdinand Bolstraat. The existing corner buildings at each station entrance location had been demolished. The first designs for the new residential buildings were presented in April 2014.

== Gallery ==
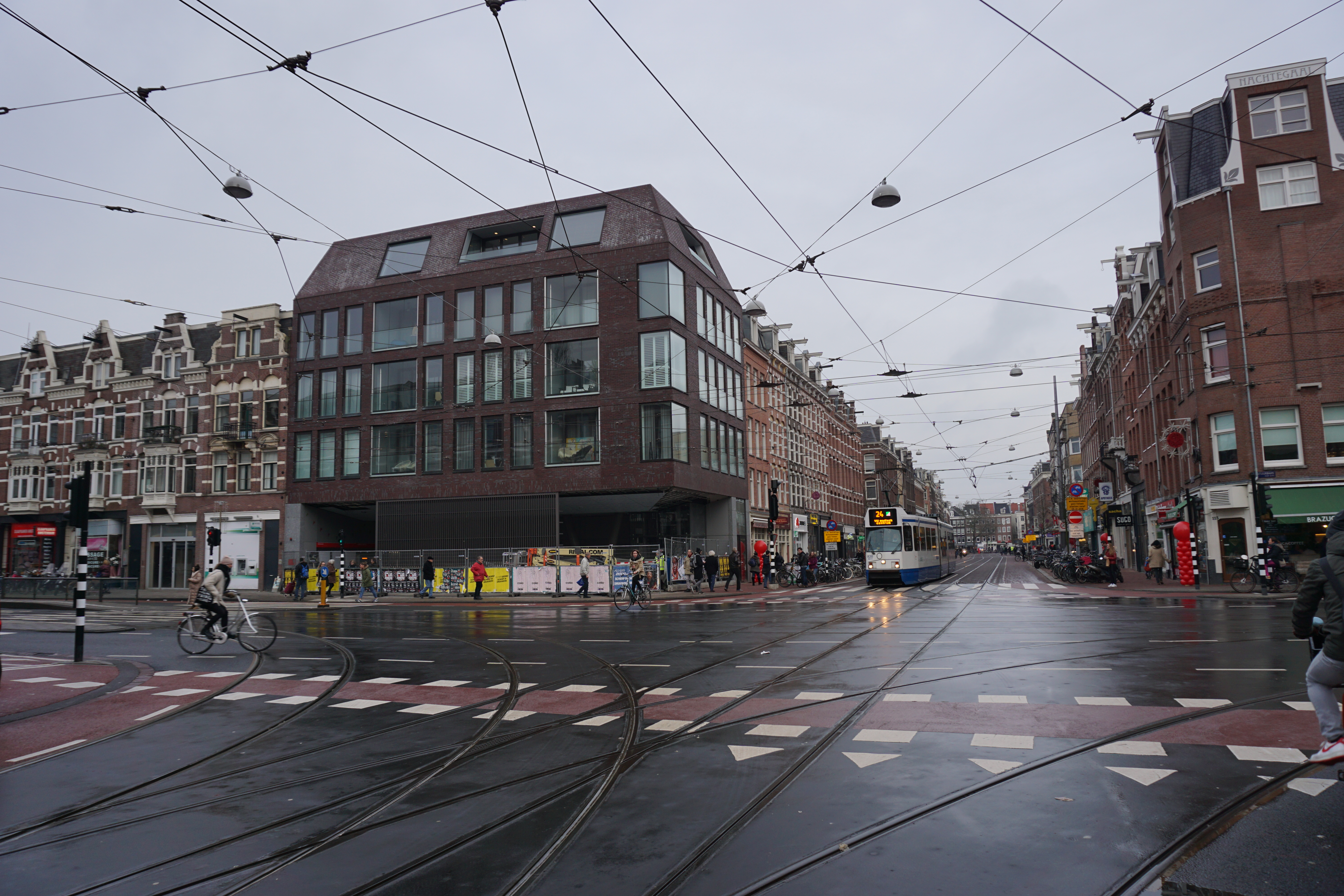
Station entrance under a residential building on Ceintuurbaan, January 2018

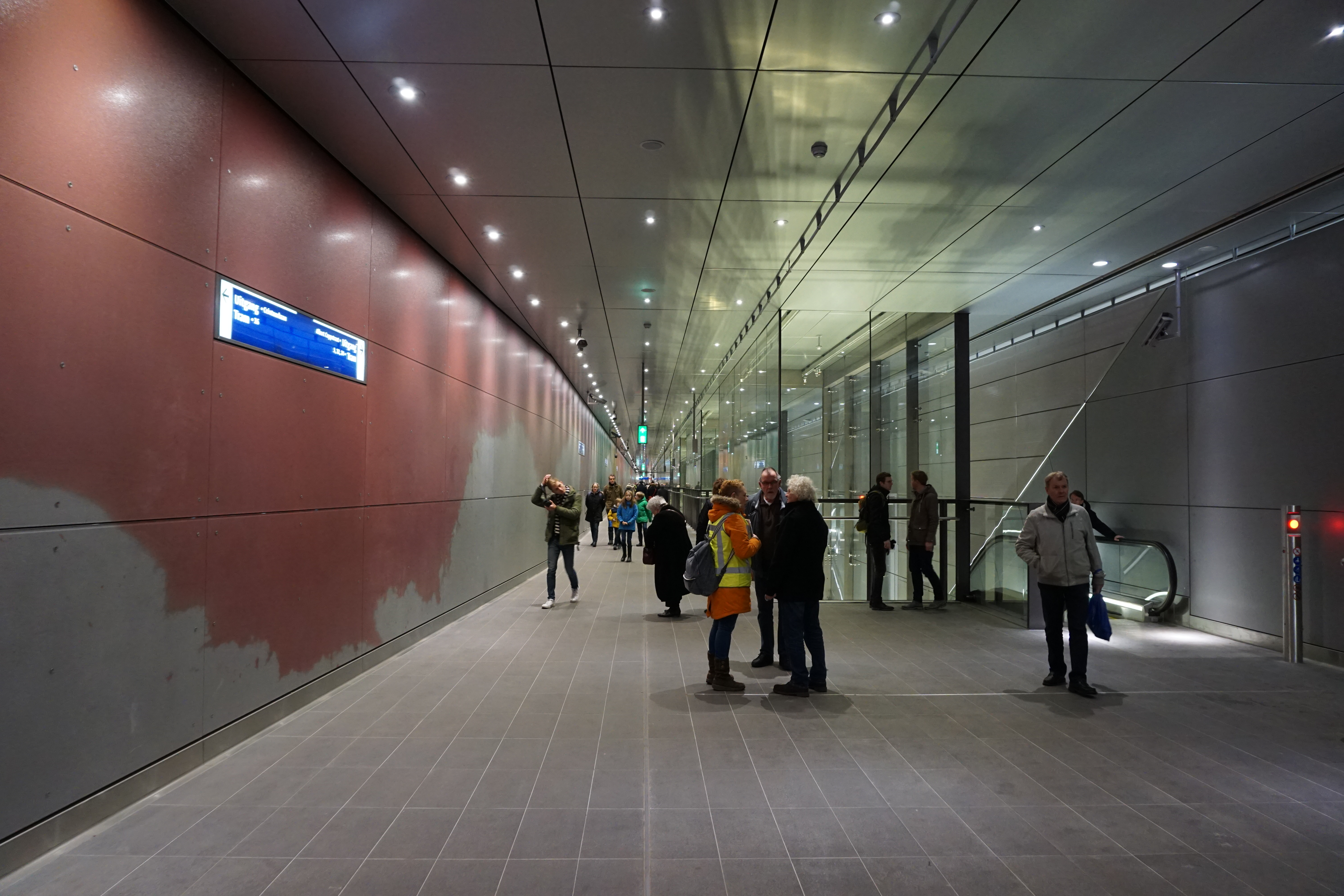
Station mezzanine, January 2018

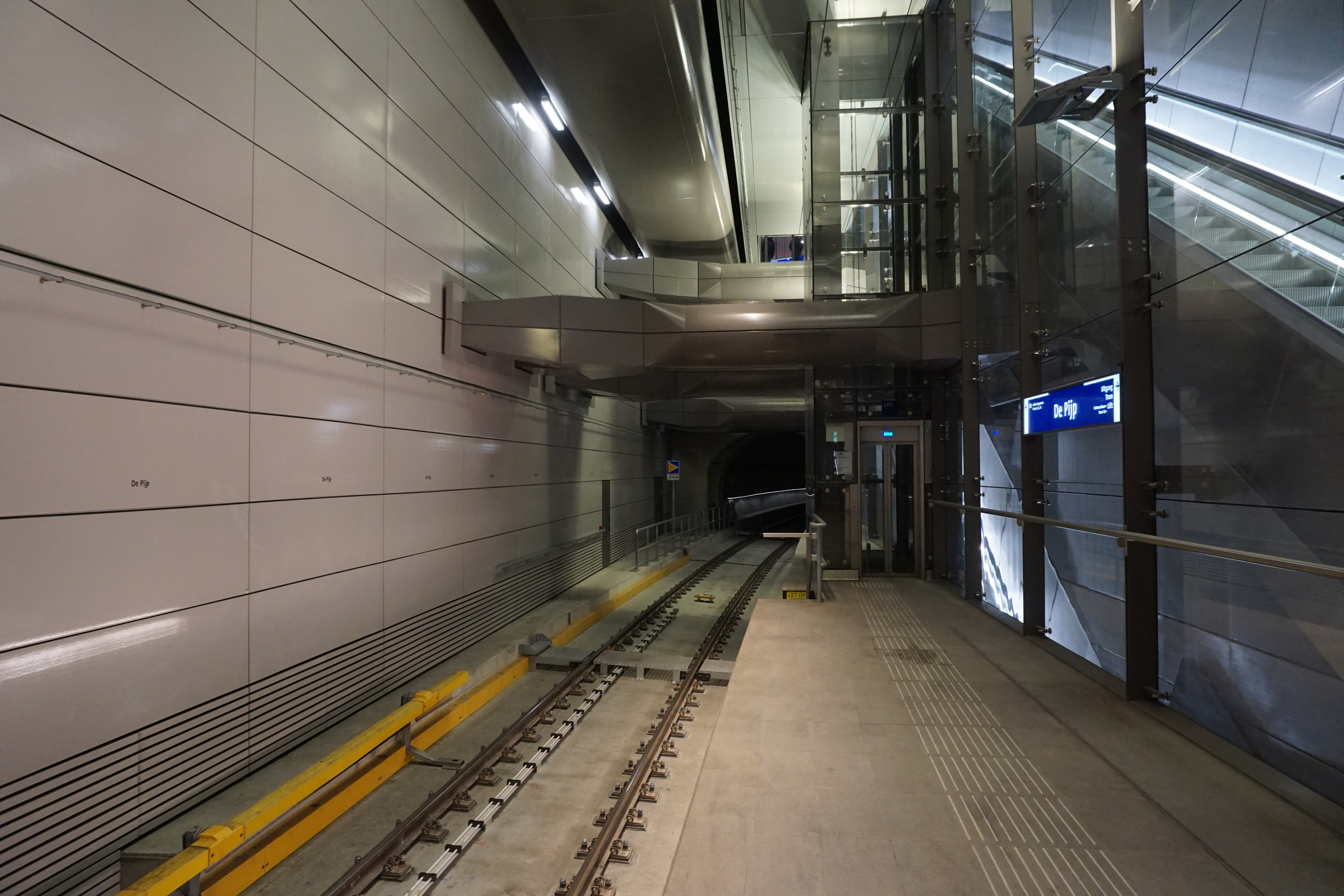
Upper-level platform (northbound), January 2018

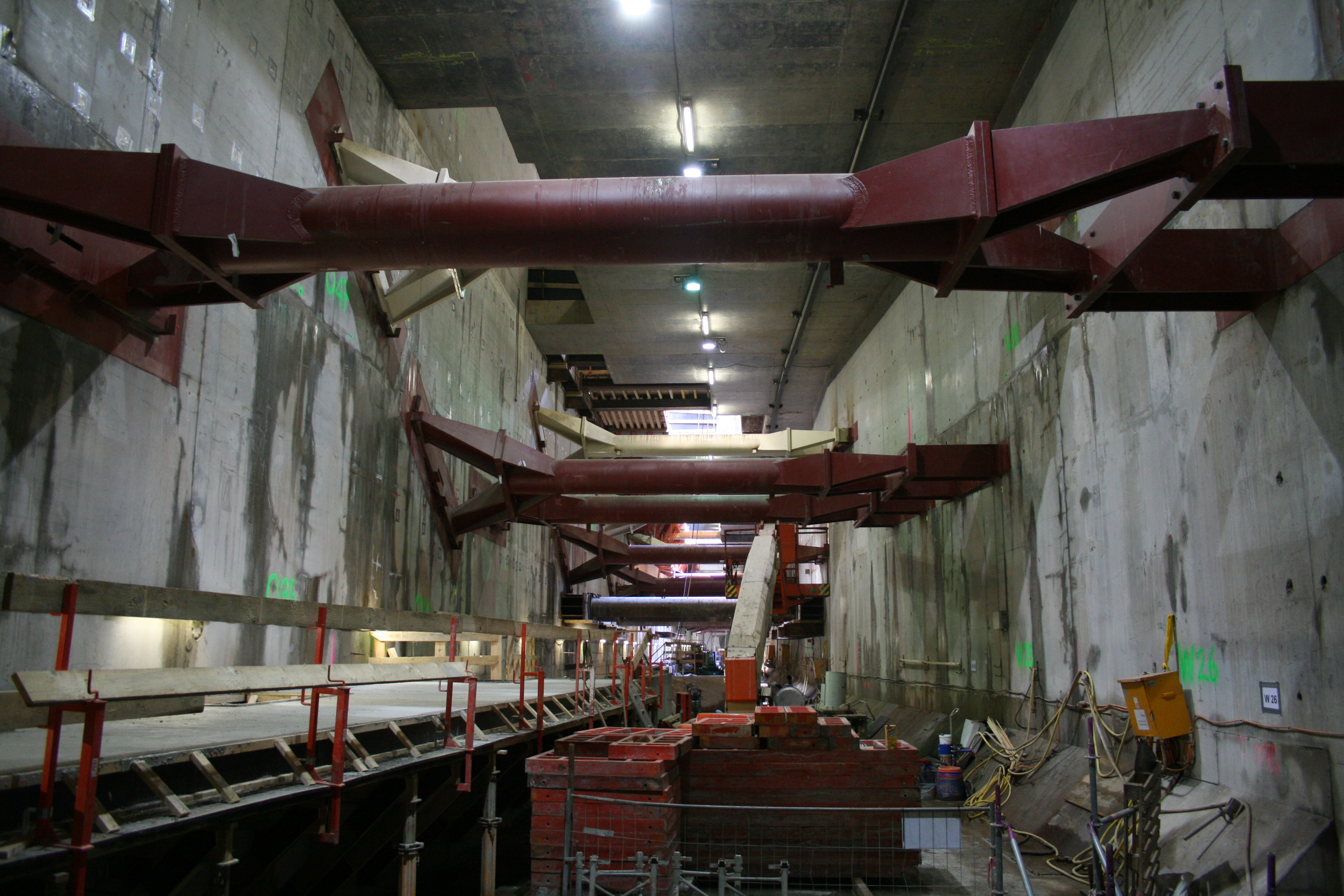
Upper-level platform (northbound) under construction, May 2014

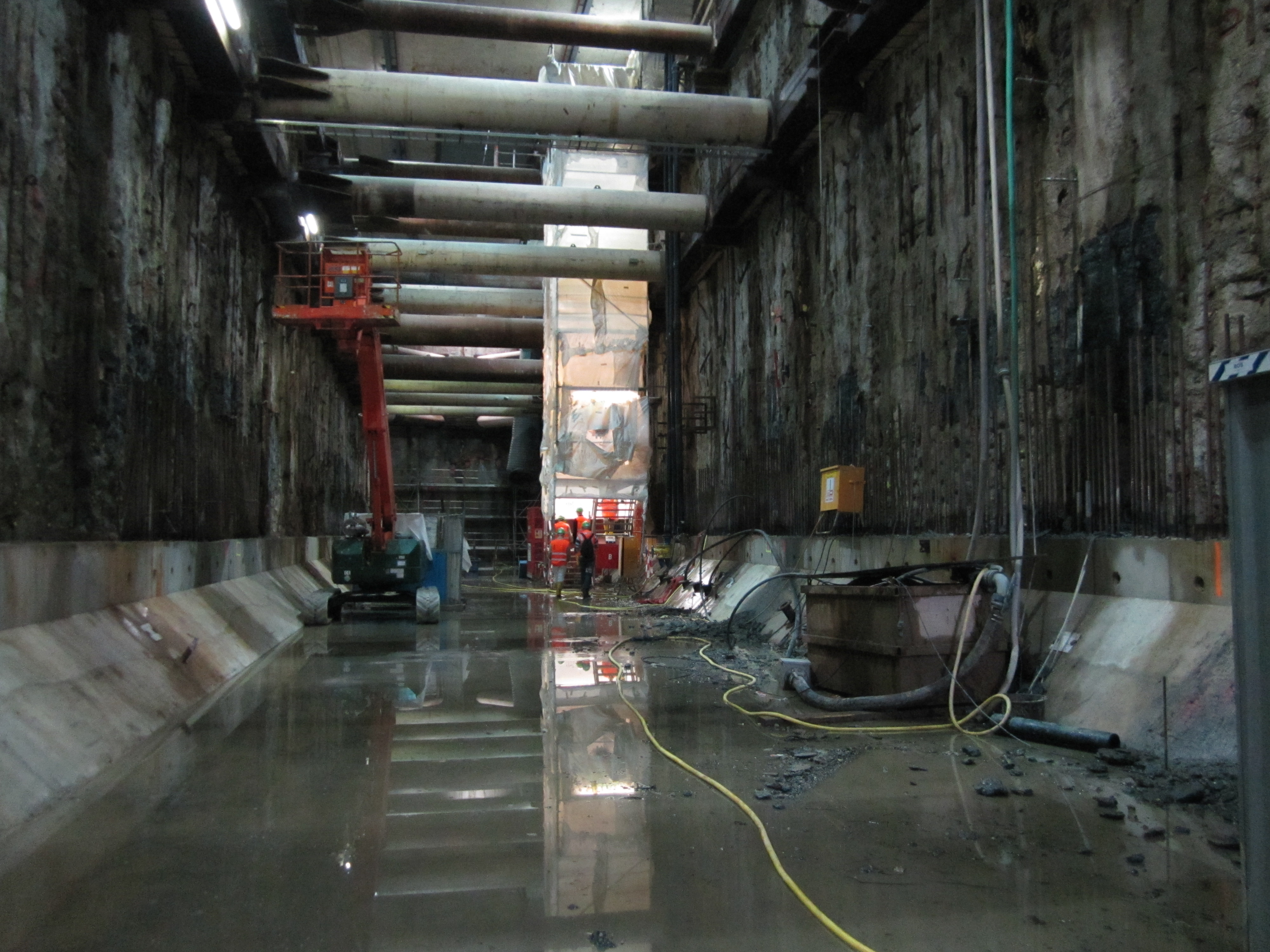
Lower-level platform (southbound) under construction, August 2010

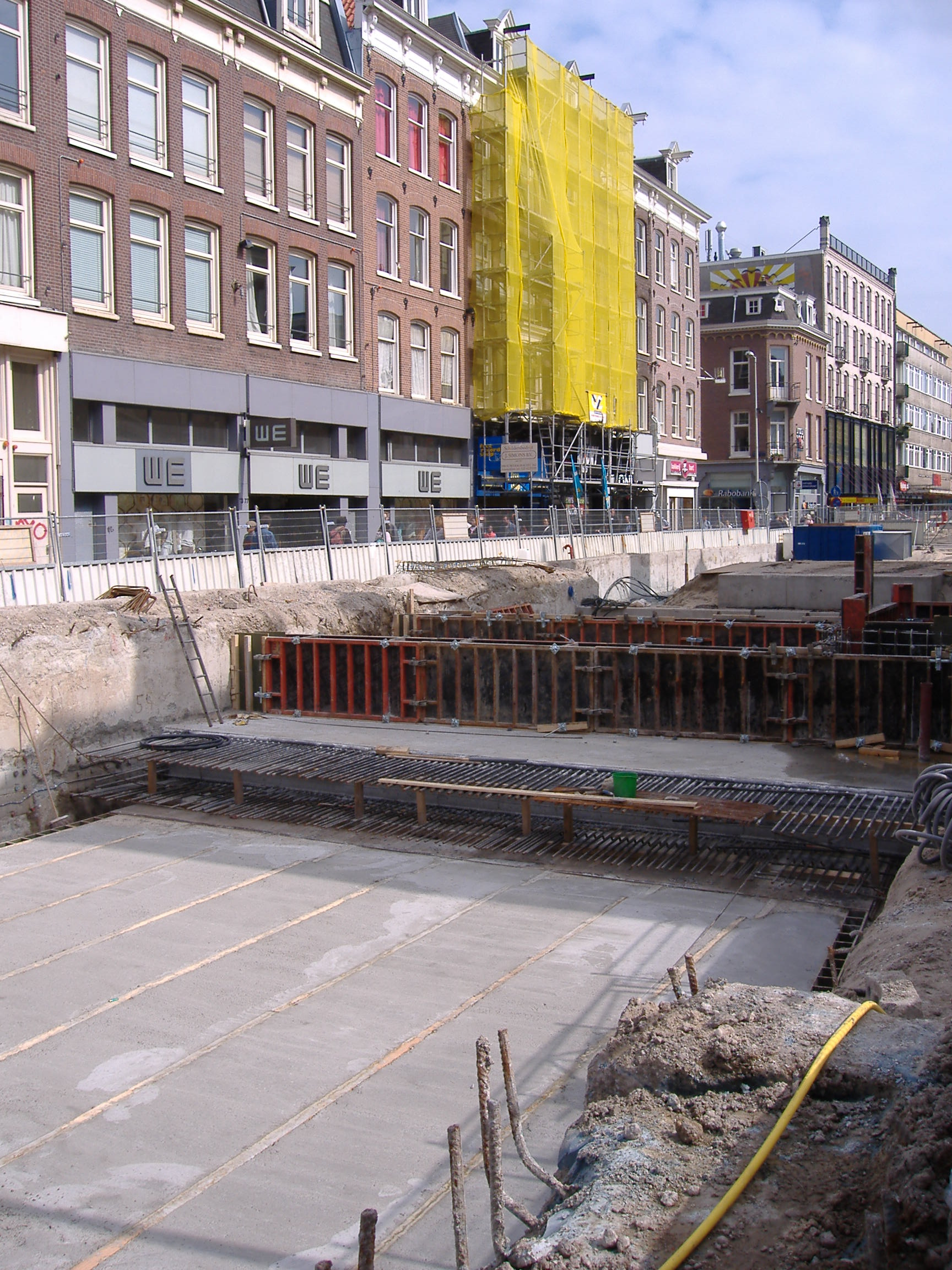
Construction of De Pijp station roof, June 2006
