= De Pijp =

- Neighbourhood of Amsterdam
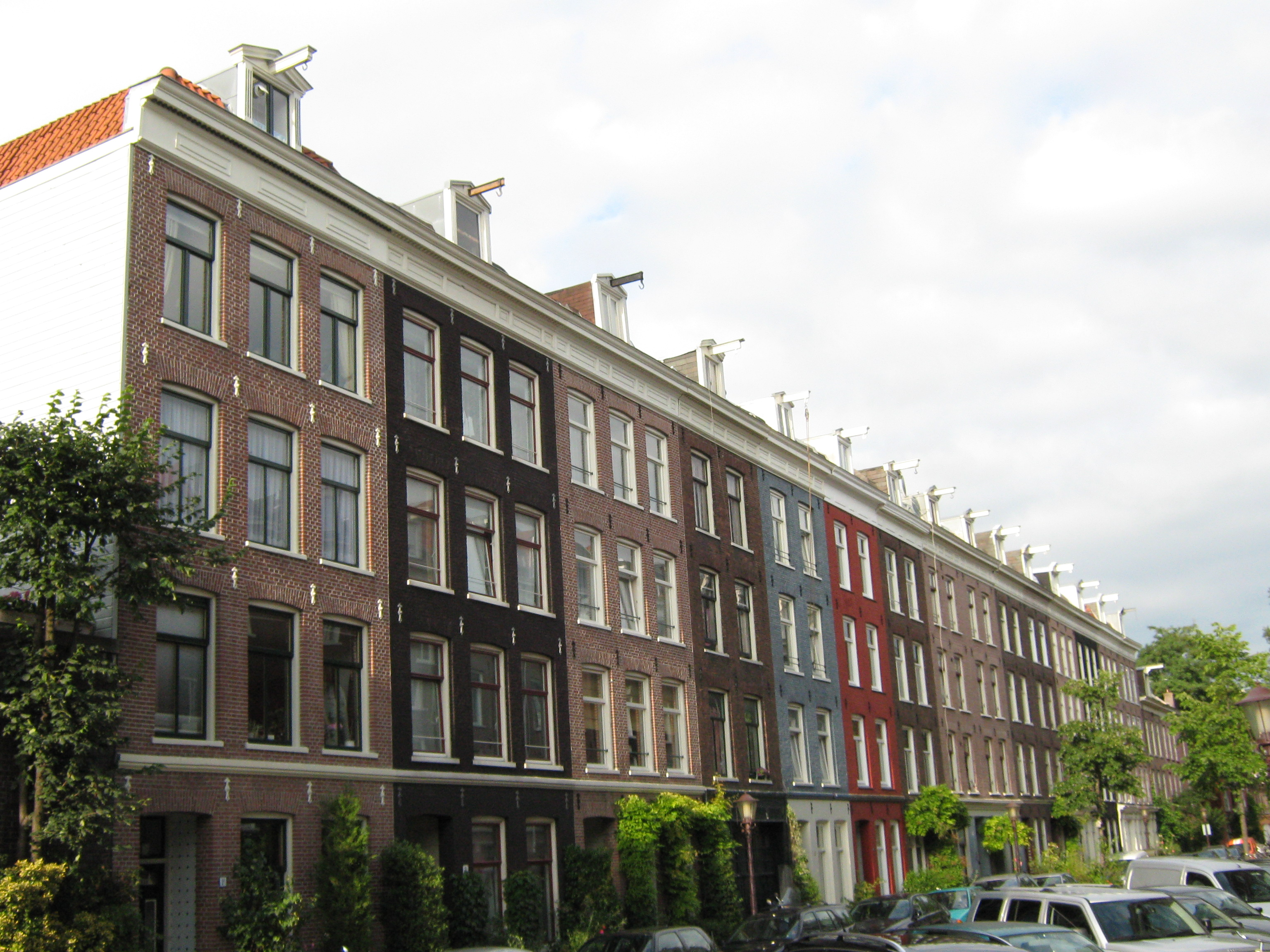
- 19th-century housing in Daniël Stalpertstraat, typical for De Pijp

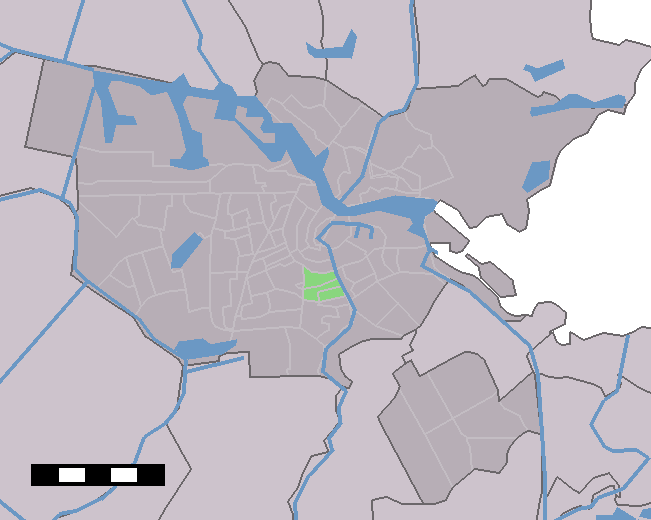
- Location of De Pijp (green) in Amsterdam
- Coordinates: 52°21′11″N 4°53′46″E
- Country: Netherlands
- Province: North Holland
- Municipality: Amsterdam
- Borough: Zuid

Population (2009)
  - Total: 33,120
- Time zone: UTC+1 (CET)

De Pijp (Dutch pronunciation: [də ˈpɛip]; English: The Pipe) is a neighbourhood of Amsterdam, Netherlands. It is located directly south of Amsterdam's city centre and it is part of the borough Amsterdam-Zuid, in a part of the city known as the Old South (Oud Zuid). It is served by De Pijp metro station. Most streets in De Pijp are named after Dutch painters, like Jan Steen, Frans Hals, Ruysdael and Vincent van Gogh. The three districts composing the area are Oude Pijp, Nieuwe Pijp and Diamantbuurt.

== Etymology ==
De Pijp means "The Pipe" in English and the origin of the name is not well documented, but it is likely a reference to the long, narrow streets that funneled people towards central Amsterdam.

== Location and transportation ==
De Pijp is located south of the city centre and the Singelgracht canal, between Boerenwetering in the west and the river Amstel in the east. Its main roads are Stadhouderskade and Ceintuurbaan, running from east to west, and Ferdinand Bolstraat, Van Woustraat and Amsteldijk running from north to south. The neighbourhood is served by tram lines 3, 4, 12, 16, 24 and 25.

In 2003 the city commenced the construction of the underground metro Noord/Zuidlijn, connecting the northern part of the city to the Zuidas in its southern borough. The metro line and an underground station at Ferdinand Bolstraat called De Pijp, was completed and began service in July 2018.

== History ==
The older section of De Pijp (nowadays called Oude Pijp) was built cheaply in the 19th century to accommodate a rapidly expanding population. The original plan was idealistic. In the spirit of Sarphati the young city engineer Van Niftrik submitted plans in 1866 for a full-scale expansion belt in the polder area along the edge of Amsterdam, where De Pijp (then called Neighborhood YY), a beautiful new centre, would be built.

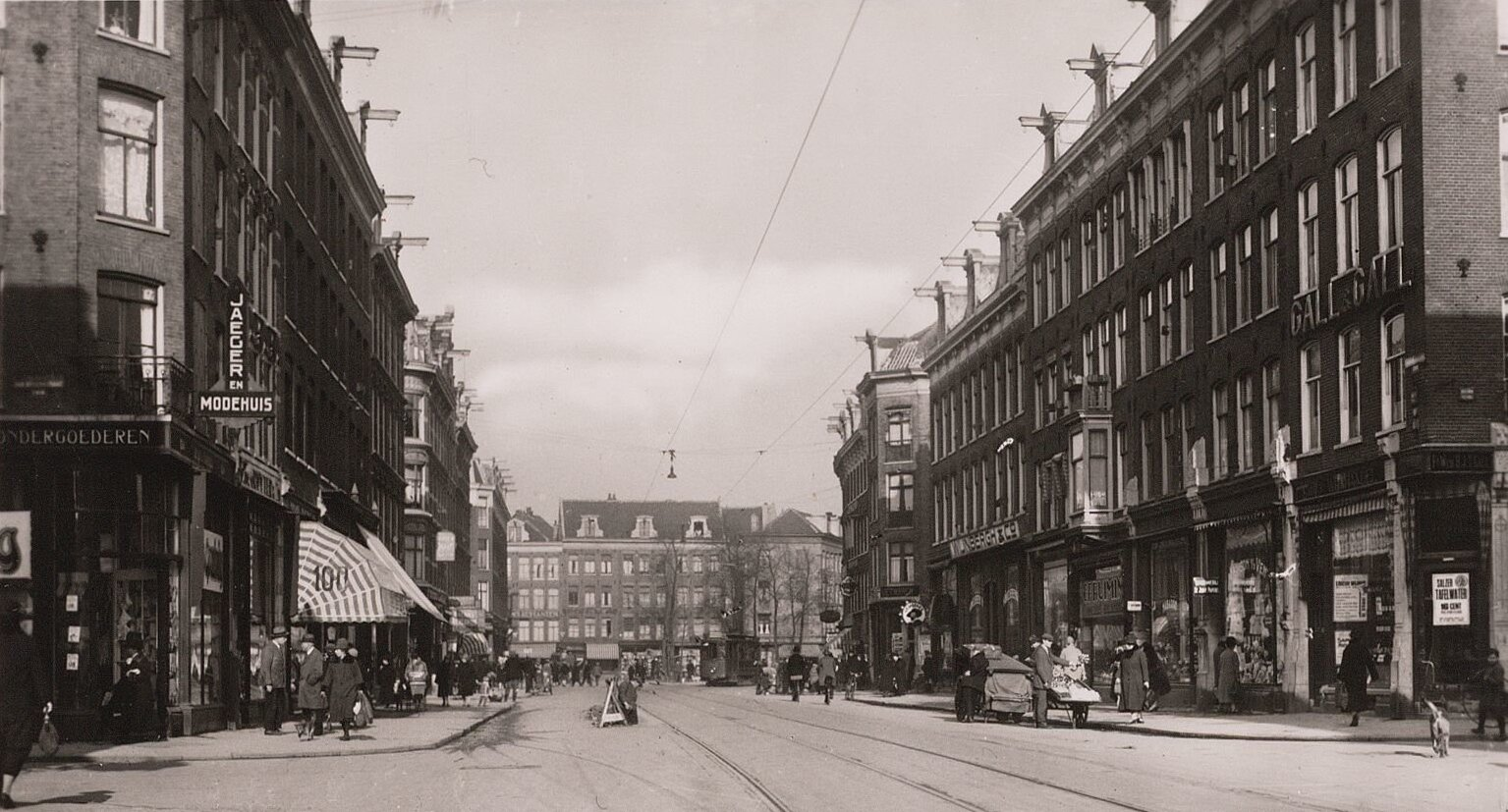
Ferdinand Bolstraat in 1948

The plan included the construction of the Amsterdam Centraal station in the middle of De Pijp, on the current location of the Sarphatipark, with a modern railway along the Ceintuurbaan. North of the track there would be large apartment blocks and wide streets, and in the south, an area of villas with green, wide avenues in a star pattern. Plan YY had a grandeur that would equal that of the new districts of Paris and Vienna. However, the council rejected the plan.

A new plan was drafted by Jan Kalff, Director of the Public Works Department (Plan Kalff of 1876, also known as the 19e-eeuwse-gordel). The only thing he retained from the old plan was the raising of the polder area with about five feet for the drainage and sewage. He refrained from regrouping so that the street pattern was a copy of the old polder lock pattern. It was all built as quickly as possible, using the cheapest materials (jerry-building). No villas were built. De Pijp became an area of long streets with a typical street wall image: generally four stories with a canopy, the height staggered between the plots, each piece topped with a white roof with a cap and lifting bar, and most houses are two windows wide.

The southern part of De Pijp, including the Diamantbuurt (literal translation: Diamond neighbourhood), was built some years later, around 1925. This area was designed according to the Amsterdam School style of architecture.

== Description ==
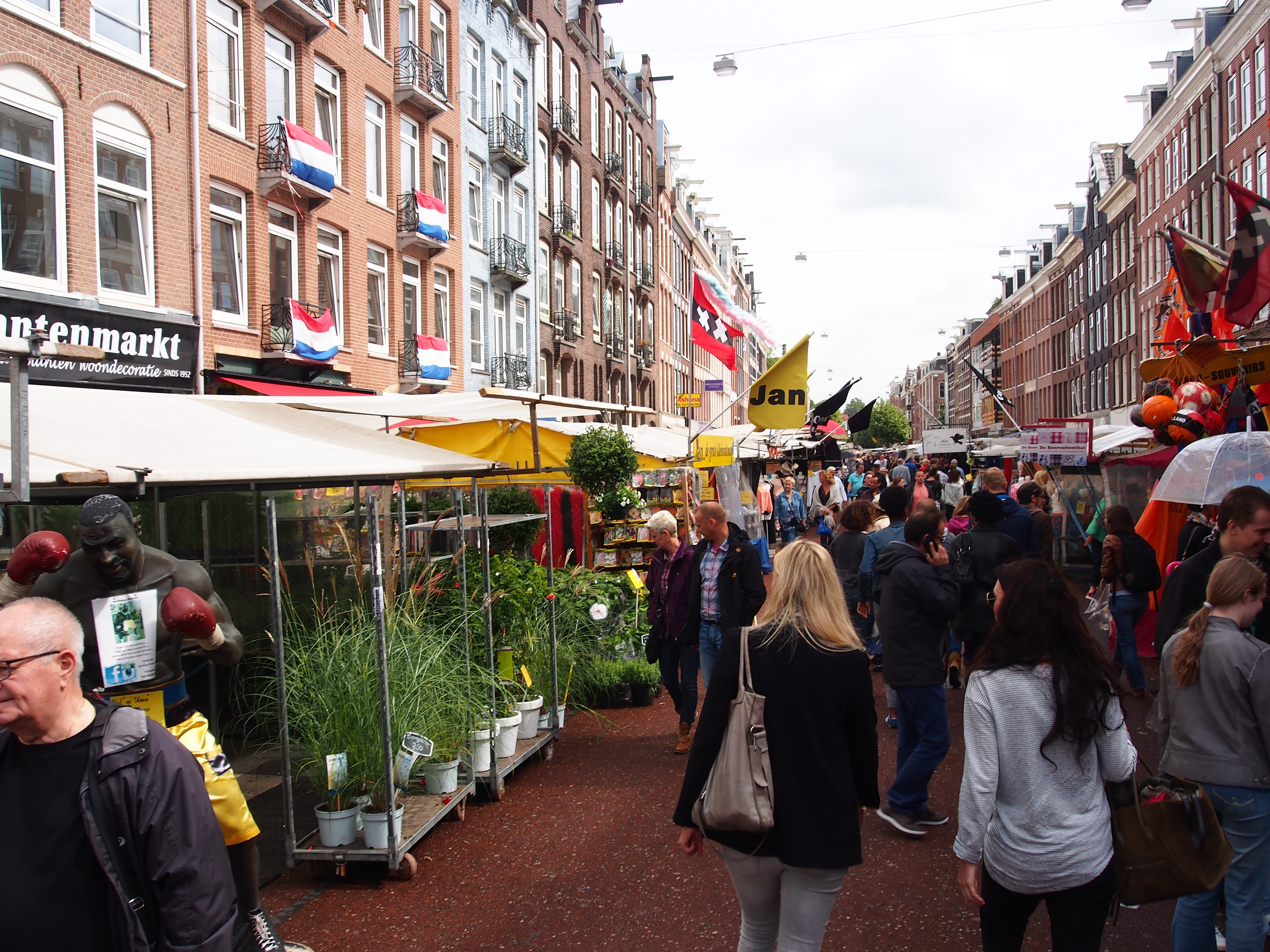
Albert Cuyp Market

De Pijp is densely populated and has a diverse population, with a relatively high percentage of highly educated people and people living alone. Notable people that lived in De Pijp include painters Piet Mondrian and Carel Willink, writers Willem Kloos, Frederik van Eeden and Gerard Reve, folk singer André Hazes, as well as actress Carice van Houten. In 2013, Mano Bouzamour published a much-disputed novel about growing up as an immigrant in this neighbourhood.

The busiest street market of the Netherlands, the Albert Cuyp Market, is located in De Pijp. It is open six days a week and attracts local shoppers and tourists alike. The former Heineken brewery in De Pijp is a major tourist attraction. Adjacent to the former brewery is the Marie Heinekenplein, which has a number of bars and cafes. Other lively streets and squares are Frans Halsstraat, Ferdinand Bolstraat, Gerard Douplein, Van Woustraat and Ceintuurbaan. Along the canal Ruysdaelkade there is a small red-light district. The former town hall of Nieuwer-Amstel is one of De Pijp's notable monuments.
