= Johan Conrad Greive =

Dutch painter (1837–1891)

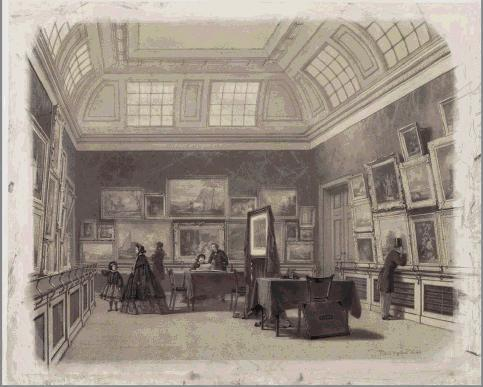
Sketch of Teylers Eerste Schilderijenzaal, collection Teylers Museum, 1862

Johan Conrad Greive (1837–1891) was a 19th-century Dutch painter.

== Biography ==
According to the RKD he was the son of a musician and the pupil of his uncle Petrus Franciscus Greive and Cornelis Springer. He signed his works J.C. Greive jr. and was a member of Arti et Amicitiae from 1863, where he became chairman for three years. His pupils were Coen Metzelaar and Hein Kever. He is known for his paintings, lithographs, and topographical drawings in various sketchbooks, many of Amsterdam subjects. He created genre works, artist portraits, landscapes, and marines.

Johan Conrad Greive's work has been offered at auction multiple times, with realized prices ranging from $1,100 USD to $66,580 USD, depending on the size and medium of the artwork. Since year 2001 the record price at auction is $66,580 USD for Seine bij Châtillon: Seine near Châtillon, sold at Christie's Amsterdam in year 2013.

A street is named after him in the neighborhood of streets named after 19th and 20th century Dutch painters in Overtoomse Veld-Noord, Amsterdam.

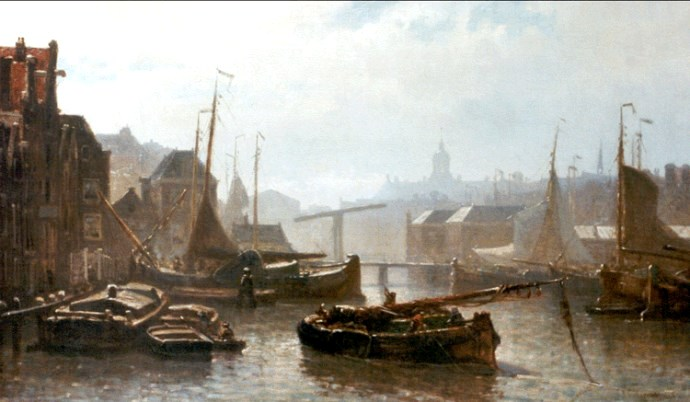
Damrak

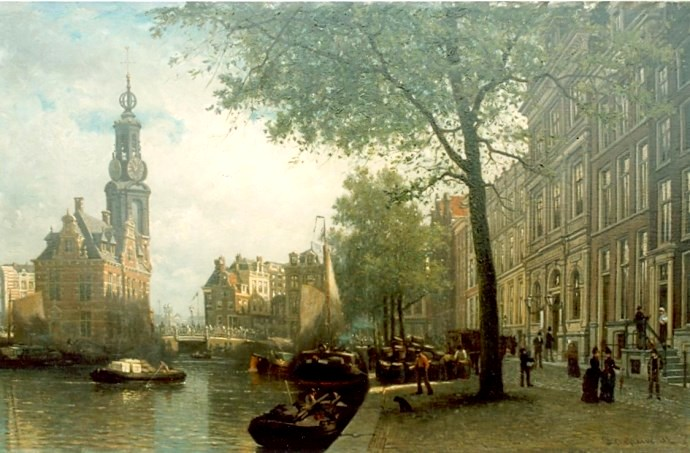
Munttoren

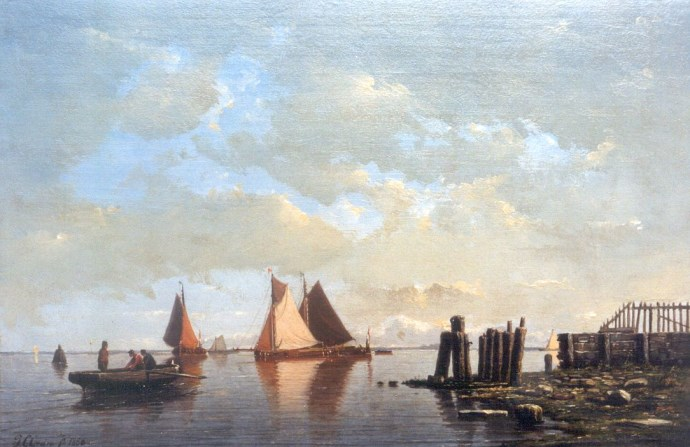
Barges
