= Petrus Franciscus Greive =

Dutch painter (1811–1872)

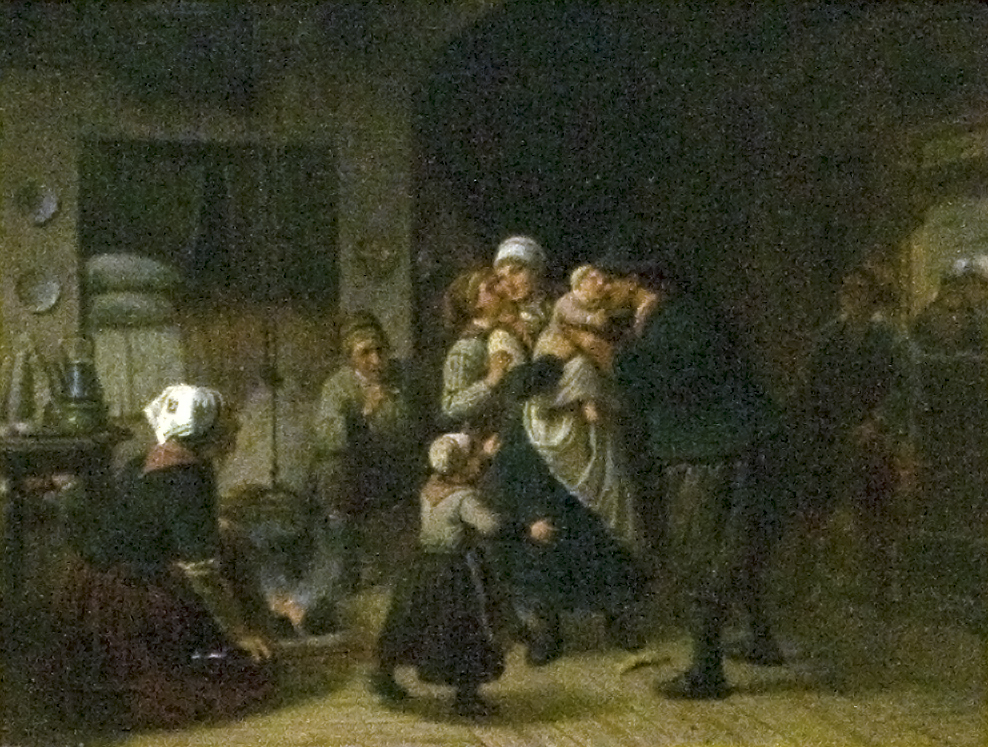
Return of the Herring Fishermen (1860), Teylers Museum

Petrus Franciscus Greive (25 March 1811 in Amsterdam – 4 November 1872 in Amsterdam) was a Dutch painter and lithographer.

== Biography ==
He studied with Jean Augustin Daiwaille, Jan Willem Pieneman and Christiaan Julius Lodewijk Portman (1799–1868) at the Rijksakademie in Amsterdam. Later, he taught there and was a member of Arti et Amicitiae. His style was based on that of the old Dutch Masters.

He was so devoted to his teaching that his own work suffered. His many notable students included August Allebé, Meijer de Haan, Jan Jacob Lodewijk ten Kate, Hein Kever, Betsy Repelius, Hendrik Jacobus Scholten and his nephew, Johan Conrad Greive.
