= Heineken Experience =

Former brewery and corporate visitor centre of Heineken beer in Amsterdam

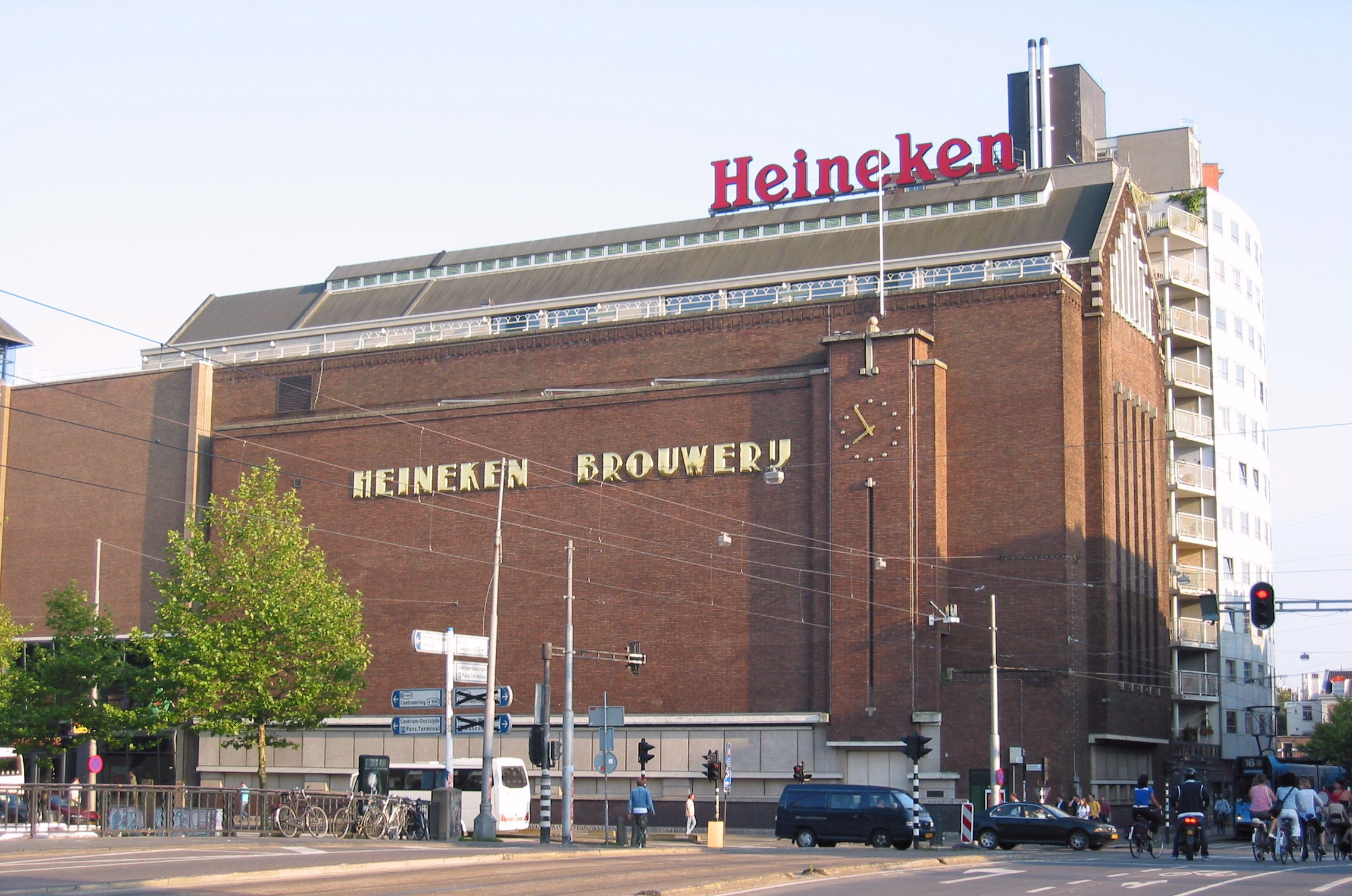
- Museum building in 2004

- Location within Amsterdam
- Established: 1991
- Location: Amsterdam, Netherlands
- Coordinates: 52°21′28″N 4°53′29″E
- Type: Industrial museum
- Website: heinekenexperience.com

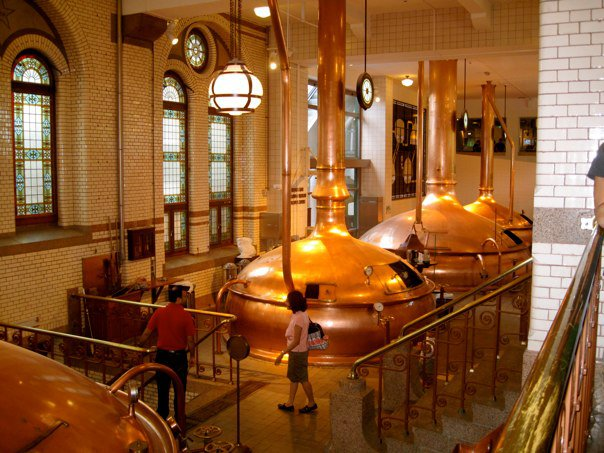
Inside the Heineken Experience in 2010

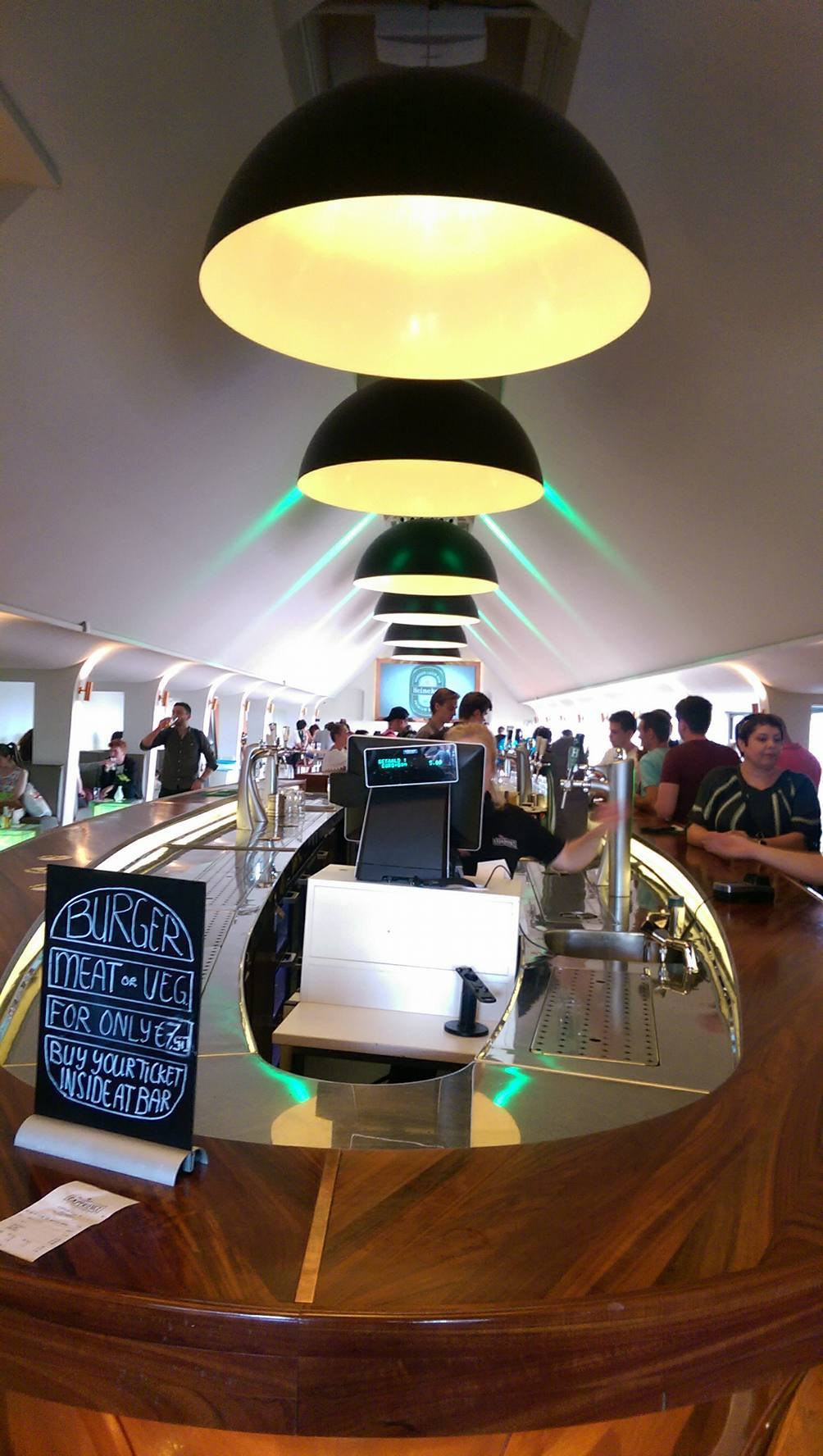
Indoor bar on the top floor for ticket holders of the experience

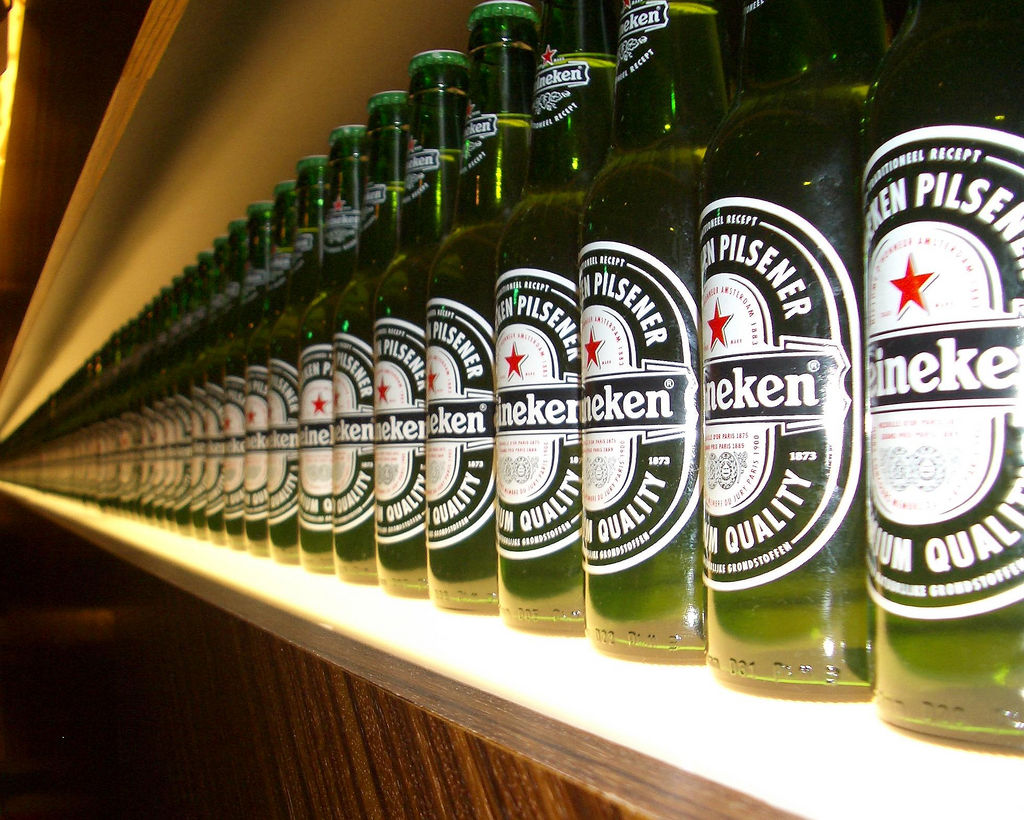
Heineken bottles at the Heineken Experience

The Heineken Experience, located in Amsterdam, is a historic brewery and corporate visitor centre for the internationally distributed Dutch pilsner, Heineken beer.

== History ==
=== Background ===
The industrial facility was built as the first Heineken brewery in 1867, serving as the company's primary brewing facility until 1988 when a more modern, larger facility was constructed on the outskirts of the city.

=== Foundation ===
In 1991, the brewery opened its doors to the public through a visitor centre, known as the "Heineken Treat and Information Centre" (Dutch: Heineken ontvangst- en informatiecentrum). Although the Heineken Experience began in 1991, there were tours of the original brewery while it was still fully operational. It grew to become one of Amsterdam's most popular tourist attractions and by 2001 the visitor centre changed its name to "Heineken Experience".

=== Expansion and reforms ===
After a year of extensive remodelling and expansion, the Heineken Experience reopened to visitors on 3 November 2008. The latest transformation of the visitor experience comprises four levels of historical artifacts, product exploration and sampling, and interactive exhibits which employ the latest high-tech multi-media technologies.

The museum underwent a 14-month renovation and expansion process from 2021 to the end of November 2022. During this period, the façade and entrance were renovated and the Reception Centre was expanded in order to put an end to the queue of people in the street.

== Redesign ==
In renovating this visitor experience, the brewery tour was designed to educate the public on the process of pilsner brewing as well as to bring the Heineken product and brand to life. As described by branding expert Bob Rogers of BRC Imagination Arts, an experience design firm based in Burbank, U.S., commissioned to design the visitor centre renovations: "We wanted to bring back the connection with beer-making, and the history of Heineken, to help people see it, touch it, taste it".

== European Route of Industrial Heritage Site ==
While the original brewing facility which houses the Heineken Experience is an historic landmark for the Heineken company, it serves also as an Anchor Point on the European Route of Industrial Heritage. The European Route of Industrial Heritage presents 845 sites in 29 European countries. Of these, 66 Anchor Points comprise the ERIH main route. In whole, eleven Regional Routes host the industrial history of the European landscape in detail, and all sites relate to ten European Theme Routes which show the diversity of European industrial history and their common roots.
