= Amsterdam Oud-Zuid =

Coordinates: 52°21′07″N 4°52′47″E

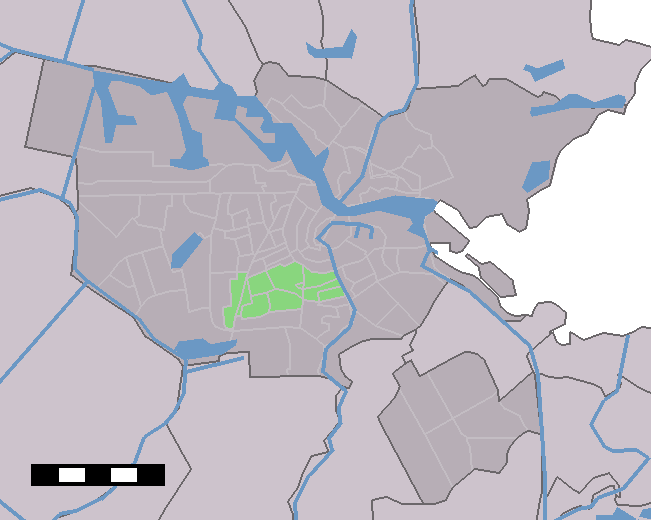
Location

Oud-Zuid (English: Old South) is the name of a neighbourhood and of a (larger) former borough (stadsdeel) of Amsterdam.

== History ==
The borough was formed in 1998 by merging the former boroughs of Amsterdam-Zuid and De Pijp, lying southwest and south of the centre of Amsterdam. In 2010, the borough was merged with Zuideramstel to form the borough Amsterdam-Zuid. On 1 January 2005 the borough had a population of 83,696. It included some of the richest neighbourhoods in Amsterdam, most of which were developed at the end of the 19th century. The neighborhood had a population of 2,121 in 2026.

== Neighbourhoods ==
The following neighbourhoods were included in the borough Oud-Zuid:

From the former borough of De Pijp:

- Oude Pijp
- Nieuwe Pijp including the Diamantbuurt

From the former borough Amsterdam-Zuid (as it existed from 1990 to 1998):

- Apollobuurt
- Hoofddorppleinbuurt
- Museum Quarter
- Duivelseiland
- Schinkelbuurt
- Stadionbuurt
- Willemspark
- Vondelpark (park)

The area Prinses Irenebuurt, which was part of the former borough of Amsterdam-Zuid, was not included in Oud-Zuid, but added to the borough Zuideramstel which was also created in 1998.

Before 1990 in popular usage amongst Amsterdammers, "Oud-Zuid" referred to a much smaller area: the Museumkwartier (incl. Duivelseiland) and the Willemspark area. The City of Amsterdam used the term "Oud-Zuid" to refer to a larger area which also included De Pijp and the Schinkelbuurt.

== Destinations ==
Popular tourist and cultural destinations are located in the borough of Oud-Zuid, including:

- the Albert Cuyp Market, which is held on the Albert Cuypstraat
- the Vondelpark: a 47 ha (120 acres) park containing an open-air theatre and until April 4, 2012 the museum of the EYE Film Institute
- the Stedelijk Museum and Van Gogh Museum, as well as the Rijksmuseum Amsterdam are located on the Museumplein ('Museum Square')
- the Heineken Experience located in the former Heineken brewery
- the Concertgebouw, a concert hall located on the Museumplein
