= Olympic Sports Park Swim Stadium =

Water sports venue in Amsterdam

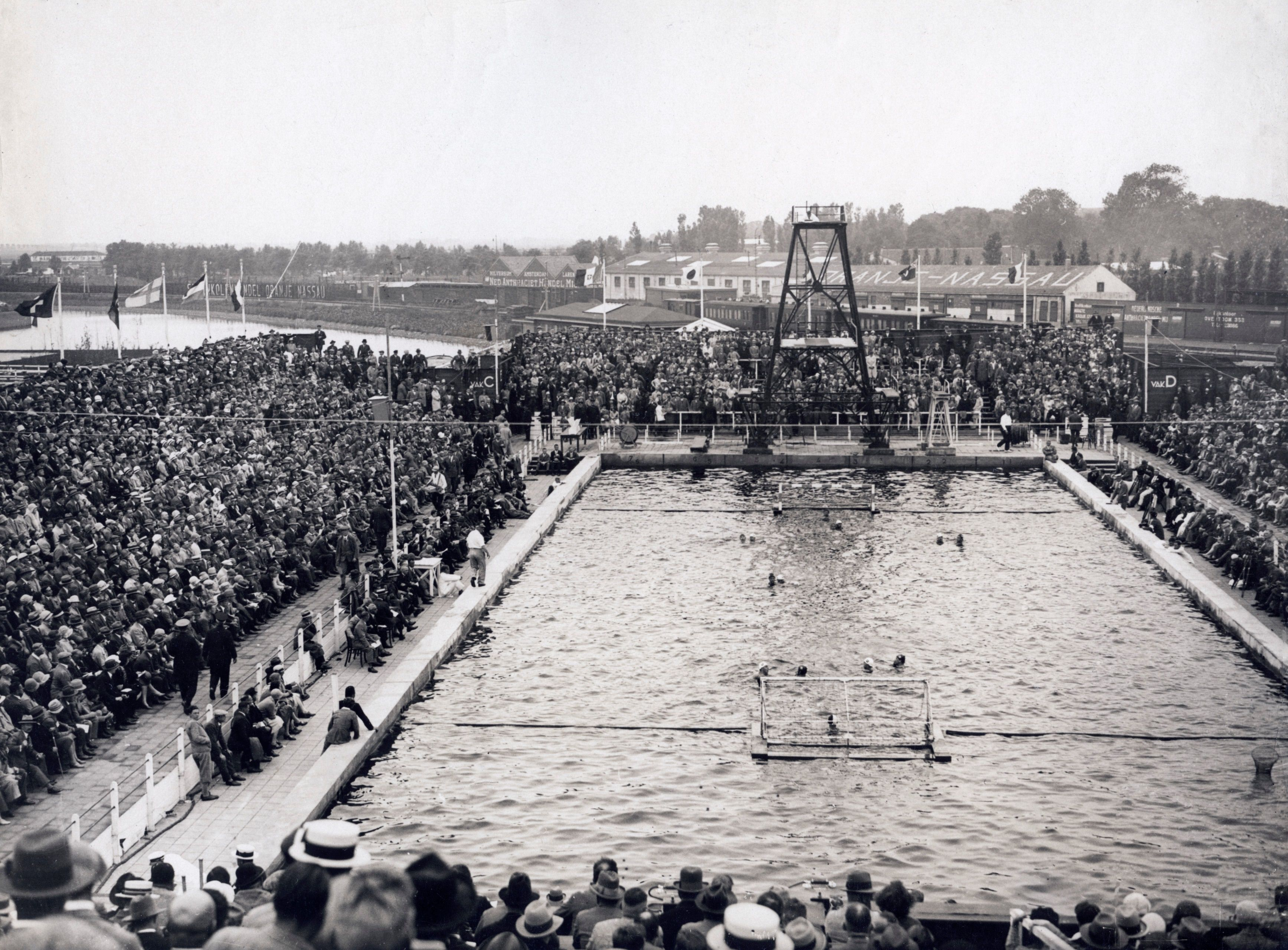
- Interactive map of Olympic Sports Park Swim Stadium
- Full name: Olympic Sports Park Swim Stadium
- Location: Amsterdam, Netherlands
- Coordinates: 52.347611°N 4.856061°E
- Capacity: 6,000

Construction
- Opened: 1928
- Demolished: 1929

Tenants
- Swimming and Water Polo events for the 1928 Summer Olympics,

The Olympic Sports Park Swim Stadium was a venue used for diving, water polo and the swimming portion of the modern pentathlon events for the 1928 Summer Olympics in Amsterdam.

The swimming basin was made of reinforced concrete that was 50 m long and 18 m wide with the deepest part near the diving area at 5 m. Stands were erected on both sides with one of them most accommodating 6000 spectators. There were 20 men's and 16 women's dressing rooms.

A temporary structure, it was demolished following the Olympics in 1929. Its site forms part of the district Olympisch Kwartier.
