= Zuideramstel =

Burough of Amsterdam, Netherlands

Coordinates: 52°19′50″N 4°52′06″E

Zuideramstel was a borough (stadsdeel) of Amsterdam, Netherlands. On 1 May 2010, it became part of the new Amsterdam Zuid borough.

The borough was formed in 1998 from the previous boroughs of Rivierenbuurt and Buitenveldert, with the addition of the Prinses Irenebuurt (which until then had been part of the previous Amsterdam Zuid borough).

== Neighborhoods of the former borough ==
- Rivierenbuurt (Scheldebuurt, IJsselbuurt and Rijnbuurt)
- Buitenveldert (Buitenveldert-West and Buitenveldert-Oost) (with the Amstelpark and the northern part of the Amsterdamse Bos)
- Prinses Irenebuurt (with the Beatrixpark)

The Zuidas business district comprises parts of the Prinses Irenebuurt, Buitenveldert and the Rivierenbuurt.
