= Nieuwe Pijp =

Coordinates: 52°21′2.53″N 4°53′56.56″E

- Neighborhood of Amsterdam
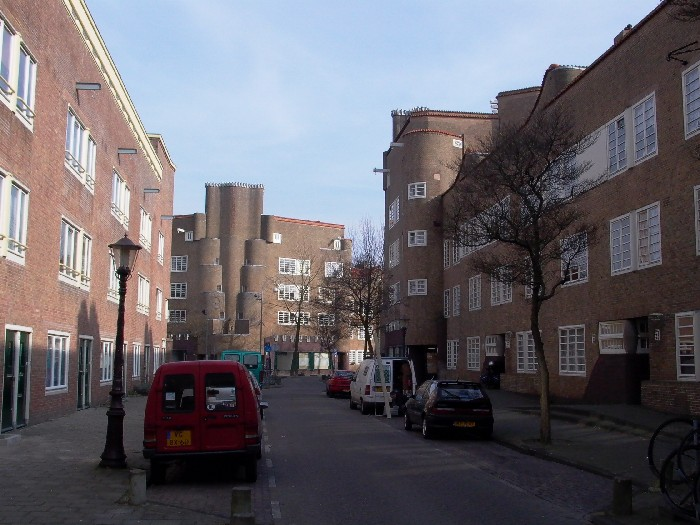

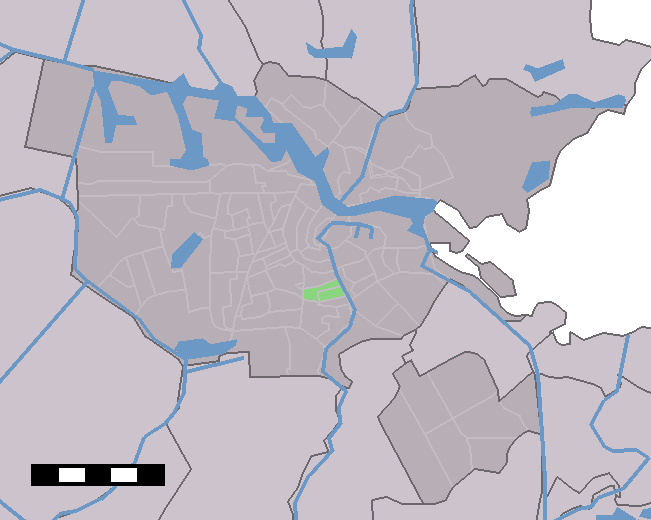
- Country: Netherlands
- Province: North Holland
- COROP: Amsterdam
- Borough: Zuid
- Time zone: UTC+1 (CET)

Nieuwe Pijp (English: New Pipe) is a neighbourhood in Amsterdam, Netherlands. It is part of the borough of Amsterdam-Zuid. The Nieuwe Pijp is bordered by Ceintuurbaan and Sarphatipark in the north, Van Woustraat in the east, Amstel Canal in the south and Boerenwetering canal in the west. Along with the Oude Pijp (English: Old Pipe), situated north of the Nieuwe Pijp, it is often simply referred to as De Pijp.

== History ==
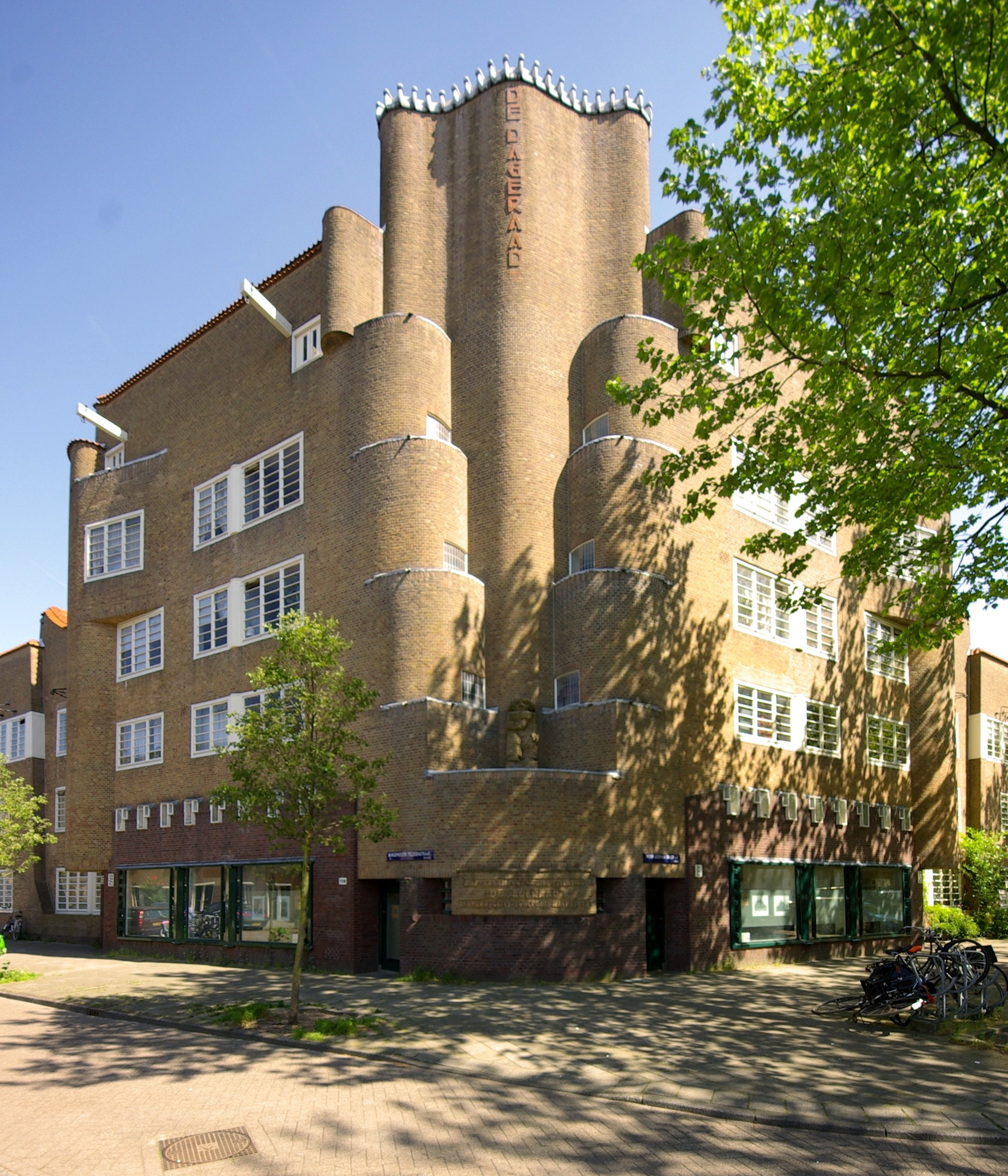
Dageraad Complex.

The Nieuwe Pijp is part of the Plan Zuid urban expansion plan designed by architect Hendrik Petrus Berlage in 1917. The neighbourhood was built between 1921 and 1929. This part of Berlage's masterplan, along with the neighbouring Diamantbuurt, was designated for working-class housing projects. The neighbourhood is characterized by Amsterdam School architecture. One of the most prominent examples of this architectural movement is the Dageraad (‘Dawn’) complex. It was designed by Michel de Klerk and Piet Kramer for a socialist housing association. It includes buildings at the Pieter Lodewijk Takstraat, the Therese Schwartzplein, Henriette Ronnerplein and Burgemeester Tellegenstraat. The complex consists of two symmetrical blocks and the characteristic corner buildings. The surrounding area was parceled out between cooperatives of other social denominations, including a catholic housing association and a liberal housing association.

A second major project, the Cooperatiehof, was built in 1928. It shows similarities with the Dageraad complex but was designed by Piet Kramer alone.
