= Amsterdam-Zuid =

Coordinates: 52°20′47″N 4°51′31″E

- Borough of Amsterdam
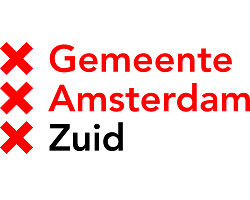
- Brandmark

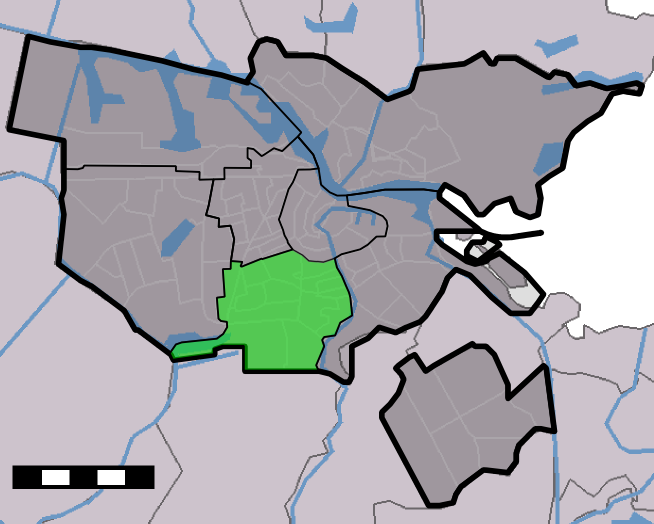
- Country: Netherlands
- Province: North Holland
- Municipality: Amsterdam

Area
  - Total: 17.41 km^{2} (6.72 sq mi)

Population
  - Total: 141,438
  - Density: 8,124/km^{2} (21,040/sq mi)
- Time zone: UTC+1 (CET)
- Website: https://www.amsterdam.nl/stadsdelen/zuid/

Amsterdam-Zuid (Dutch pronunciation: [ˌɑmstərdɑmˈzœyt]; Amsterdam South) is a borough (stadsdeel) of Amsterdam, Netherlands. The borough was formed in 2010 as a merger of the former boroughs Oud-Zuid and Zuideramstel. The borough has almost 138,000 inhabitants (2013). With 8,500 homes per square kilometer, it is one of the most densely populated boroughs of Amsterdam. It has the highest income per household of all boroughs in Amsterdam.

== History ==
Amsterdam-Zuid is the borough of Amsterdam situated to the south and southwest of the Singelgracht canal, along the Stadhouderskade city ring road. It is bordered by the Vondelpark in the northwest, the Westlandgracht canal in the west, the Amstel river in the east and the Kalfjeslaan in the south, which also forms the border with the municipality of Amstelveen.

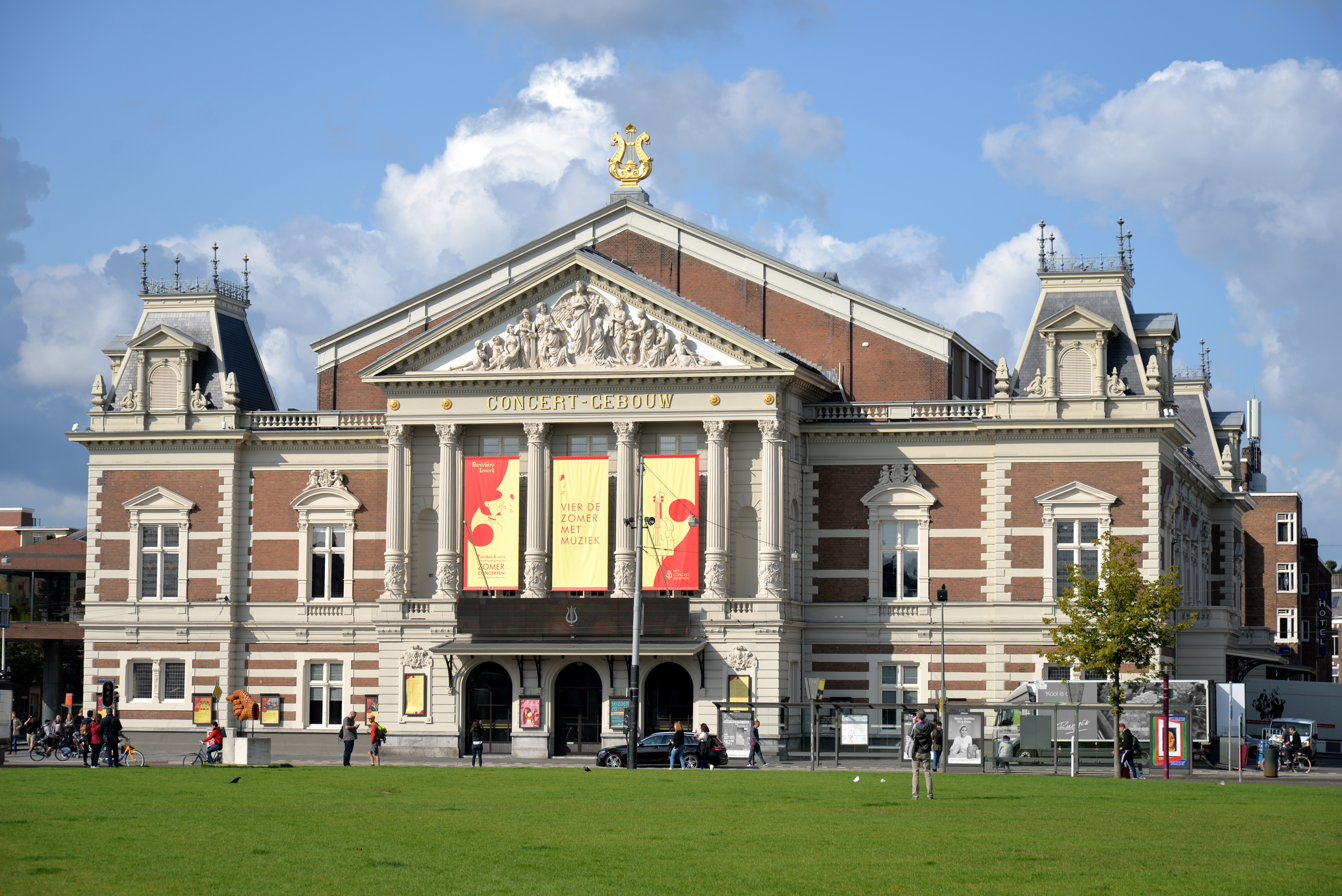
The Concertgebouw in the Museumkwartier

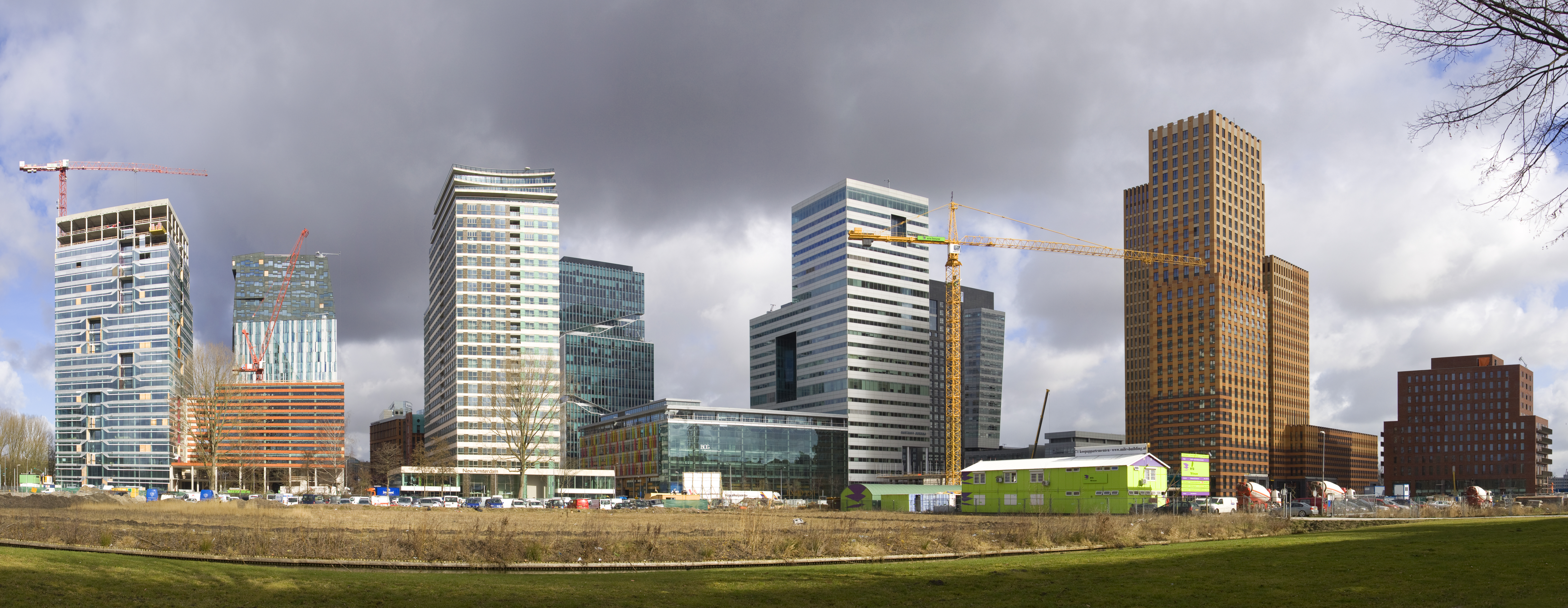
The Zuidas business district

The Singelgracht canal had been Amsterdam's city border since the 17th century, when the Amsterdam canal belt was constructed. The taking down of the wall surrounding the Singelgracht, the outer canal, in the second half of the 19th century allowed for the development of new residential areas. South of the former wall, the first neighborhoods to develop were the Oude Pijp neighborhood, the neighborhood surrounding the Rijksmuseum, and the Willemspark neighborhood. This area is now also known as Oud Zuid ('Old South').

In 1917, the area was further developed southwards on the basis of Plan Zuid, the ambitious urban expansion plan designed by Dutch architect and city planner Hendrik Petrus Berlage. Berlage's plan included wide streets lined with four-story apartment blocks for the middle class. The plan also included public art to be installed in the new residential areas. Between 1920 and 1940, the Plan Zuid neighborhoods of Nieuwe Pijp, Diamantbuurt, Rivierenbuurt, Stadionbuurt and Apollobuurt were constructed, with many buildings designed in Amsterdam School style. This area is also known as Nieuw Zuid ('New South').

Another neighborhood built in the 1920s is the Hoofddorppleinbuurt, west of the Schinkel river. This neighborhood is part of Plan West, another urban expansion plan by Berlage which was designed for the western area of the city on the territory of the former municipality of Sloten.

In the 1950s and 1960s, the Buitenveldert neighborhood and the smaller Prinses Irenebuurt became the last major residential developments in the southern part of the city. In 1961, the Amsterdam RAI Exhibition and Convention Centre opened, which was to become the largest convention centre in the Netherlands. The A10 motorway, which runs through the southern borough, was constructed in 1962. In 1978, the first section of the Weesp–Leiden railway and the Amsterdam Zuid railway station opened along the southern part of the A10 motorway. In the 1990s and 2000s, the area surrounding the railway station became the rapidly developing business district of Zuidas.

== Borough government ==
Until 2014, the Amsterdam boroughs, called stadsdelen or 'districts', were governed by a directly elected district council (deelraad) as well as a separate district executive board, the members of which were appointed and controlled by the council. Since the 2014 municipal elections, the district councils have been abolished and replaced by smaller, but still directly elected district committees (bestuurscommissies). The district committees are elected every four years, on the same day as the city's central municipal council. Each district committee elects three of its members to form an executive committee (dagelijks bestuur). The district committees' jurisdiction is determined by the central municipal council. Responsibilities delegated to the 2014–2018 district committees include parks and recreation, streets and squares, refuse collection, permits and events, preparation of zoning plans, passports and drivers licenses, and welfare work.

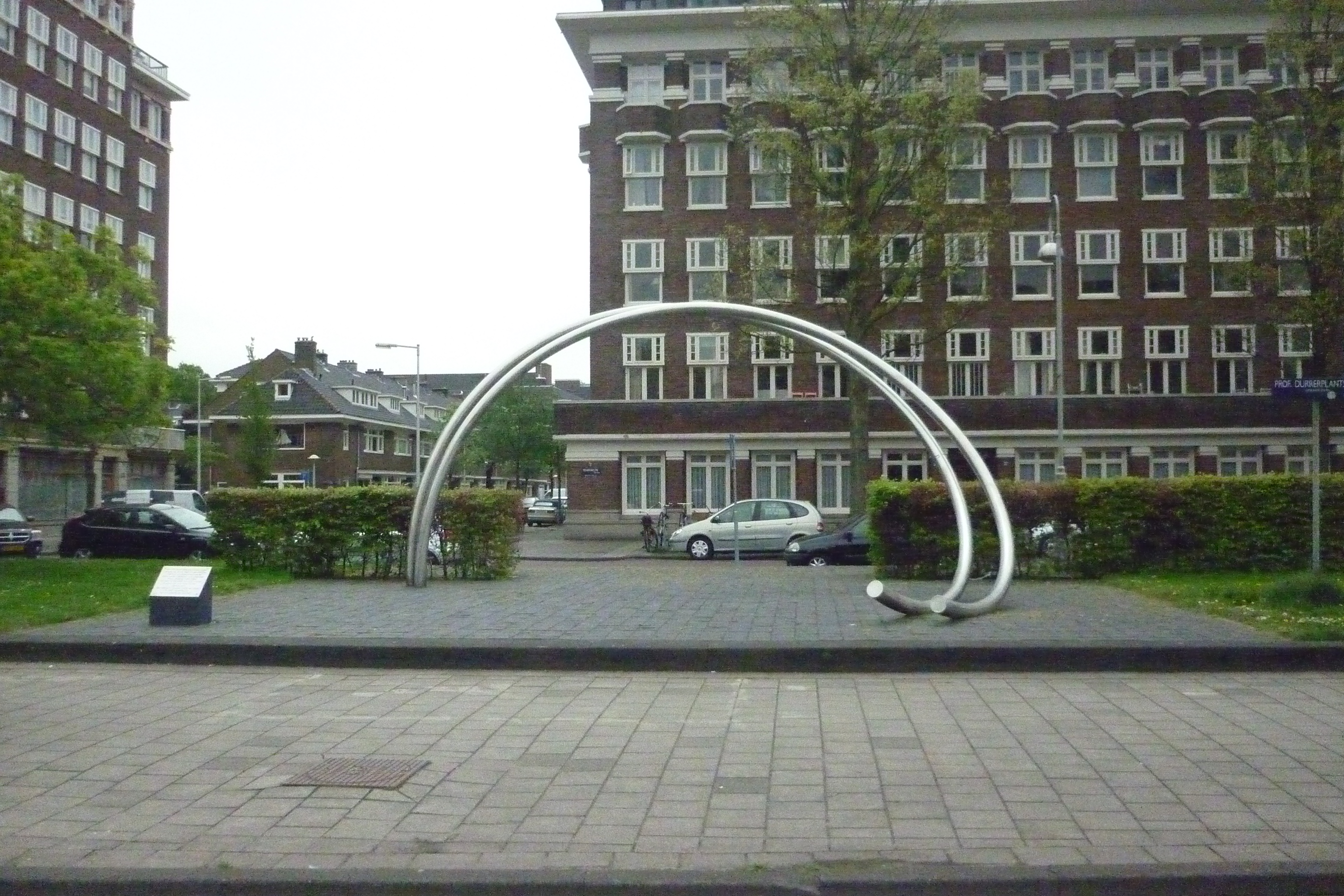
Minervaplein, Apollobuurt.

The district committee of Amsterdam-Zuid consists of 15 members. The committee was elected on 19 March 2014. Five national political parties and two local parties are represented in the committee. On 7 April 2014, after three weeks of coalition talks, the committee elected its executive committee. Executive committee chair is Sebastiaan Capel (D66), the other members are Paul Slettenhaar (VVD) and Marijn van Ballegooijen (PvdA).

| District Committee Zuid | D66 | VVD | PvdA | GL | CDA | PvdO | ZPB |
|---|---|---|---|---|---|---|---|
| 2014 elections | 5 | 3 | 2 | 2 | 1 | 1 | 1 |

The borough office (stadsdeelkantoor or 'district office') of Amsterdam-Zuid is located at President Kennedylaan 923, near the Amsterdam RAI Exhibition and Convention Centre.

== Neighborhoods ==
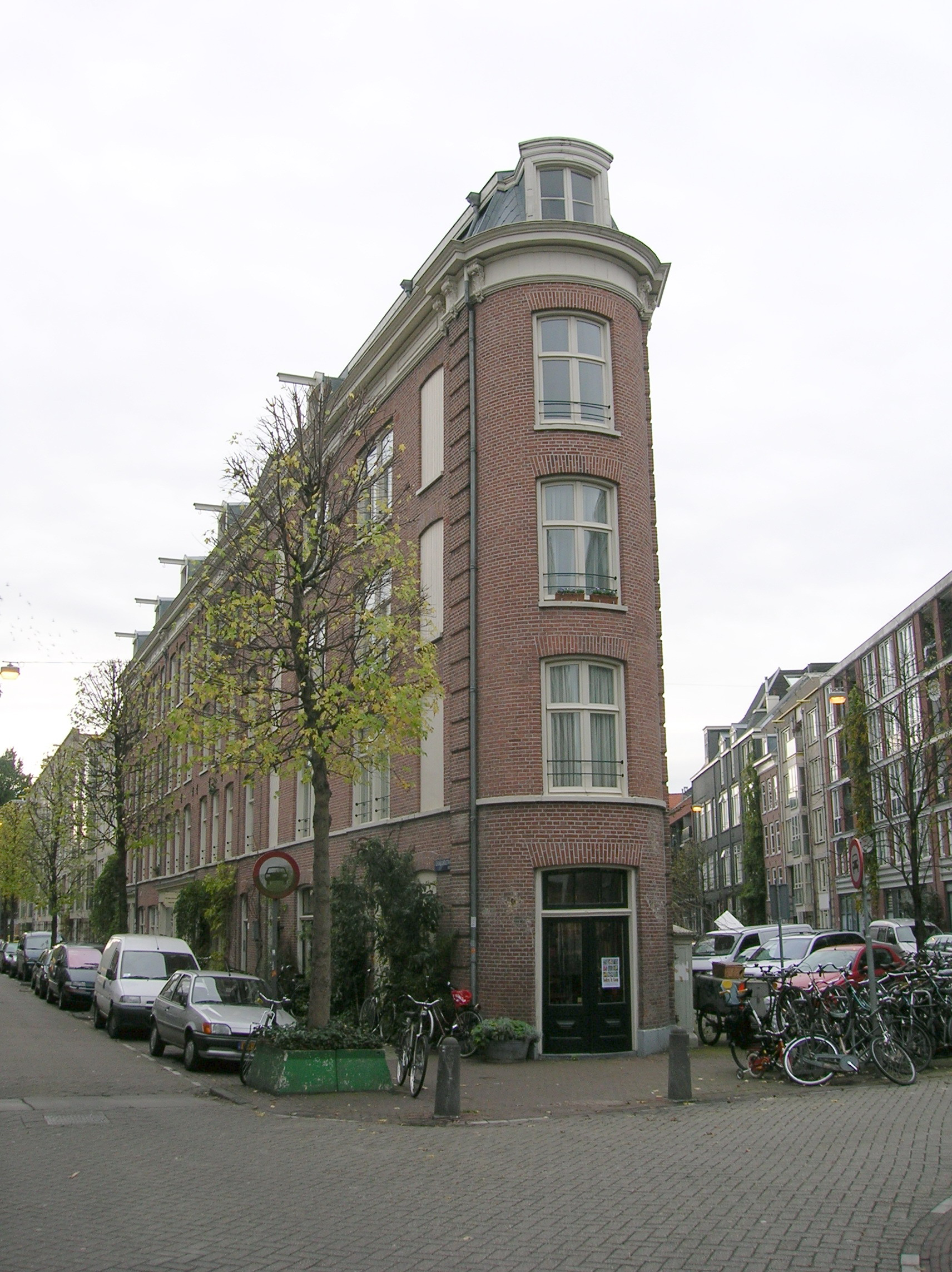
Gerard Doustraat, Oude Pijp.

- Apollobuurt
- Buitenveldert
- Hoofddorppleinbuurt
- Museumkwartier (Duivelseiland)
- De Pijp (Oude Pijp – Nieuwe Pijp – Diamantbuurt)
- Prinses Irenebuurt
- Rivierenbuurt
- Schinkelbuurt
- Stadionbuurt (Olympisch Kwartier)
- Vondelpark (park)
- Willemspark
- Zuidas
