= Schinkelbuurt =

- Neighborhood of Amsterdam
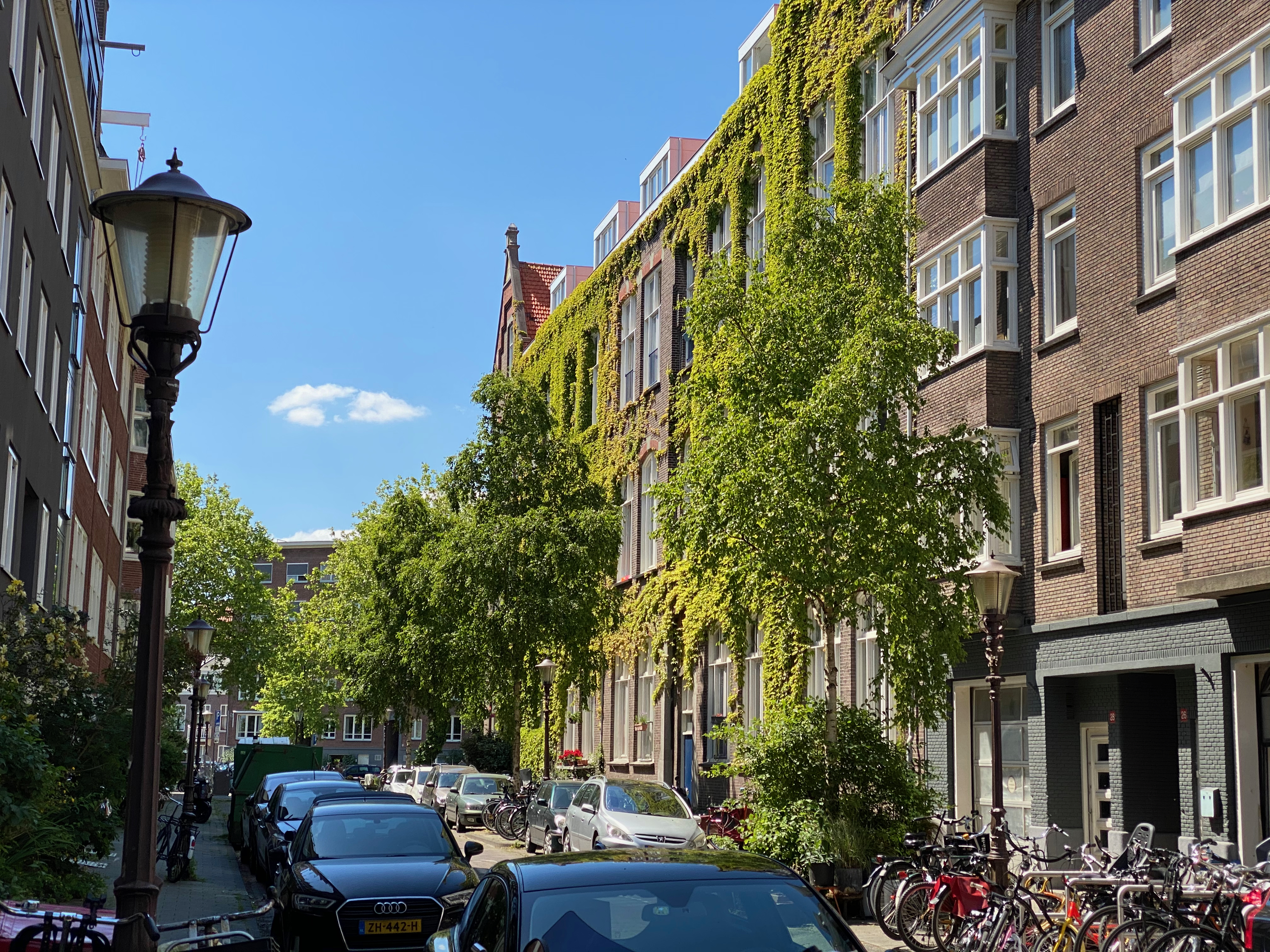

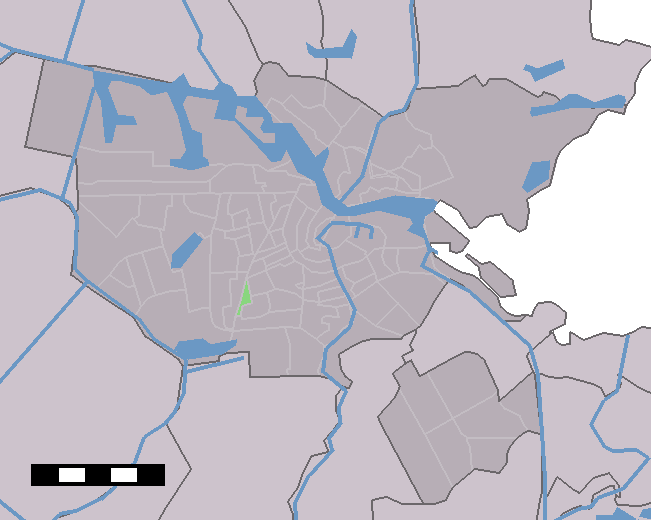

- Location within Amsterdam Location within Netherlands
- Coordinates: 52°21′8.62″N 4°51′16.12″E
- Country: Netherlands
- Province: North Holland
- Municipality: Amsterdam
- Borough: Zuid

Area
  - Total: 03,417 km^{2} (1,319 sq mi)
- Elevation: −3 m (−9.8 ft)

Population (31/07/2017)
  - Total: 3,835
- Time zone: UTC+1 (CET)
- Postal code: 1075
- Area code: 020

Schinkelbuurt (Dutch pronunciation: [ˈsxɪŋkəlˌbyːrt]; "Schinkel neighbourhood") is a little neighborhood of Amsterdam, Netherlands. It is located directly south of Amsterdam's city centre and it is part of the borough Amsterdam-Zuid, in the part of the city known as the "Old South" (Oud Zuid).

Schinkelbuurt is roughly bounded by the water of the Schinkel river and the street Amstelveenseweg. Most of the houses date back to the beginning of the 20th century, and the streets often have names from the shipping industry, such as Schinkelhavenstraat, Sluisstraat, Zeilstraat, Vaartstraat and Baarsstraat. Schinkelbuurt neighbors Vondelpark and Rembrandtpark.

== History ==
The neighborhood near the Schinkel has existed since the Middle Ages. This neighborhood was also known as the Double Neighborhood. The area to the east of the Schinkel belonged to the municipality of Nieuwer-Amstel until 1896 and then to the municipality of Amsterdam, while the area to the west of the Schinkel belonged to the municipality of Sloten until 1921. The Double Neighborhood was demolished in the 1930s in order to widen the Schinkel and Amstelveenseweg.

Around 1900, a neighborhood arose on a triangular piece of land to the south, which with its so-called 'revolutiebouw', or revolutionary buildings, contrasted with the luxurious buildings just across street Amstelveenseweg.

== Schinkel River ==
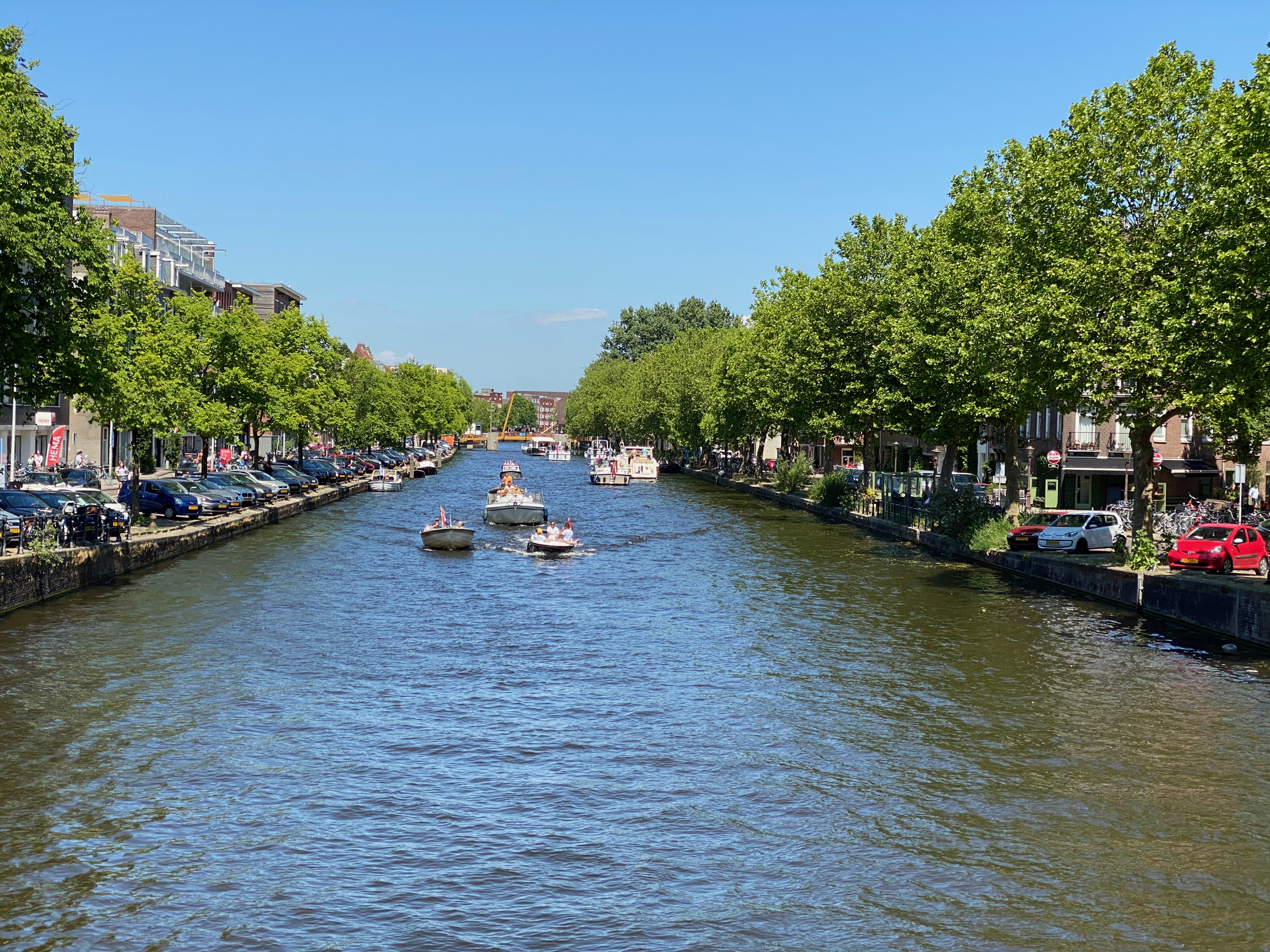
Schinkel River

The Schinkel is a small channeled river in Amsterdam. The river runs from the Overtoomse Sluis to Nieuwe Meer. In 1413, as an extension of the Schinkel, the Kostverlorenvaart was dug in the direction of the IJ bay. In 1875, a connection was made with the IJ via the canals Kattensloot, Singelgracht and the Westerkanaal, creating a waterway between Nieuwe Meer and the IJ.

The Schinkel was channeled as part of the Plan Zuid from 1917, developed by Dutch architect and city planner Hendrick Petrus Berlage. However, the water north of the Schinkel lock is still identified as a river.

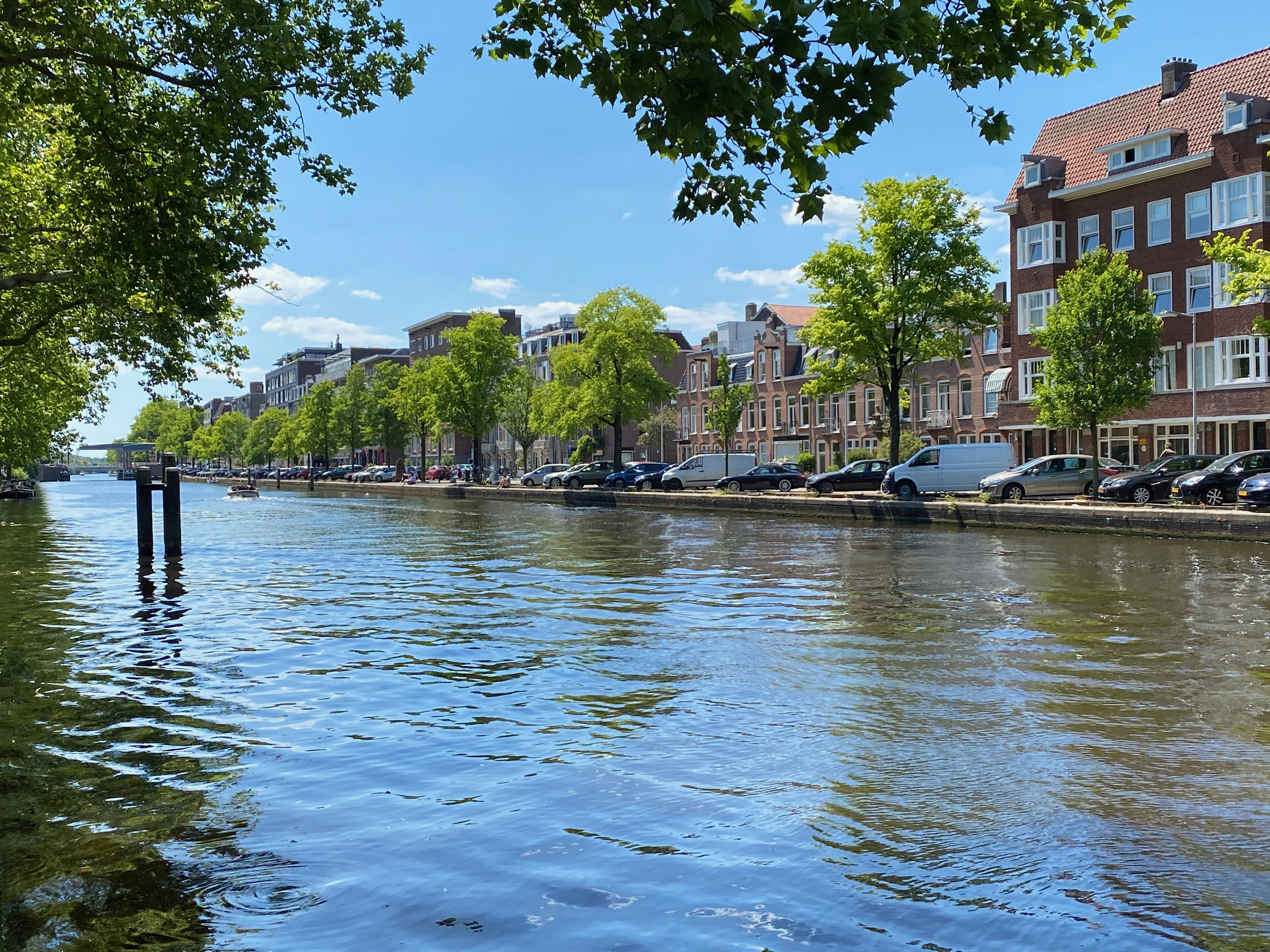
Schinkel River

A houseboat village is located near the lock, comprising a large concentration of houseboats. In the first half of the 20th century, there was a wooden pool, in the river, called the Schinkelbad. The Schinkel is still used for freight transport by water, a function that the city canals have lost. Many leisure yachts also use this connection to pass between the Ring canal (Dutch: Ringvaart) at Haarlemmermeer and the IJ, which is part of the Standing Mast route (dutch: Staande Mastroute). Some bridges cross the Schinkel: the Theophile de Bockbrug (bridge no. 360), the Zeilbrug (bridge no. 348) and the Schinkelbrug (bridge no. 176P).

== Schinkelkade ==
Along the Schinkelkade, some residents have been active for years with the construction and maintenance of tree pits, decorating the base of the trees with herbs and plants. In spring and summer, these landscape arrangements become a feature off the neighborhood. Along the river, there are also potted plants, benches and chairs, making it place to sit and look out over the water.

== Piet Mondrian ==
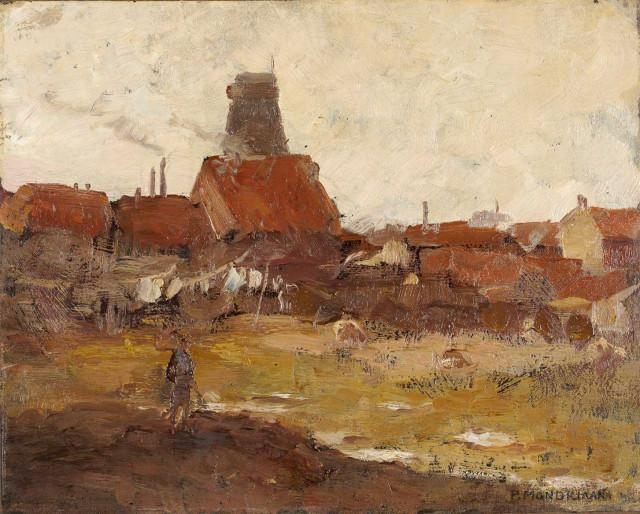
View of Schinkelbuurt, Piet Mondrian

One of the first cityscapes painted by Piet Mondrian is the work from ca. 1895 entitled "View of Schinkelbuurt" (Gezicht op Schinkelbuurt). The painting shows part of the district bathed in sunlight. This neighborhood, inhabited from the Middle Ages at the end of the Overtoomse canal, belonged to the edges of the city in Mondrian's time. Mondrian based his landscapes and cityscapes on direct observation.

Mondrian, however, continued to work on View of Schinkelbuurt in his studio, only adding the light accents later. The thumbtacks in each corner indicate that the canvas or paper had been punctured first, probably on the inside of the lid of his painting case.

== Listed Buildings ==
- OCCII (Onafhankelijk Cultureel Centrum In It), former horse-drawn tram depot and squat, Amstelveenseweg 134 (Abraham Salm 1881-1885)
- House of Detention II (Huis van Bewaring II), Havenstraat 6 (1890)
- Remise Havenstraat, built by the Amsterdam Municipal Transport Company (1914)
- Haarlemmermeerstation (1915)

== See also ==
- Canals of Amsterdam
- Amsterdam-Zuid

== Gallery ==
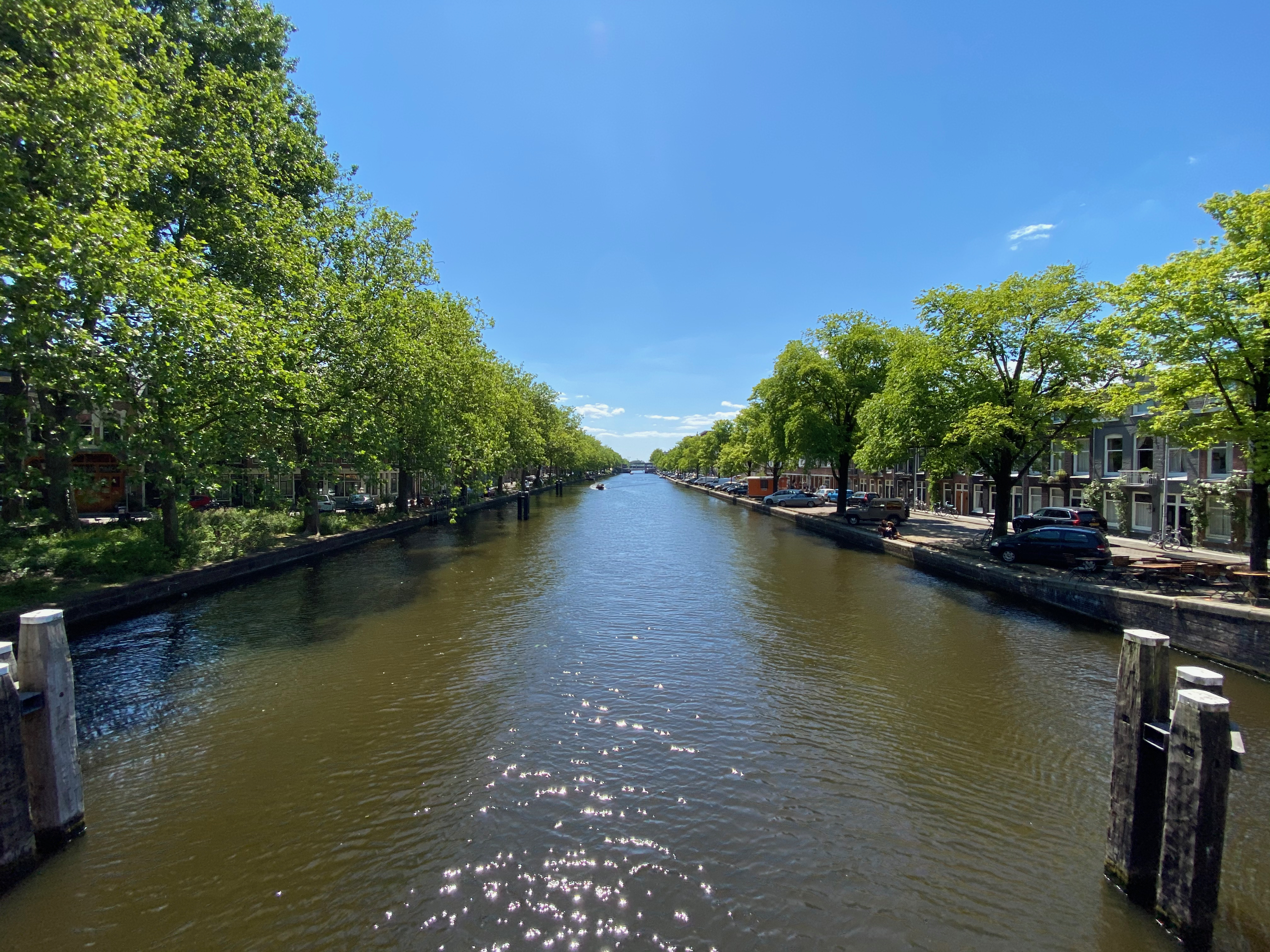
Schinkel River

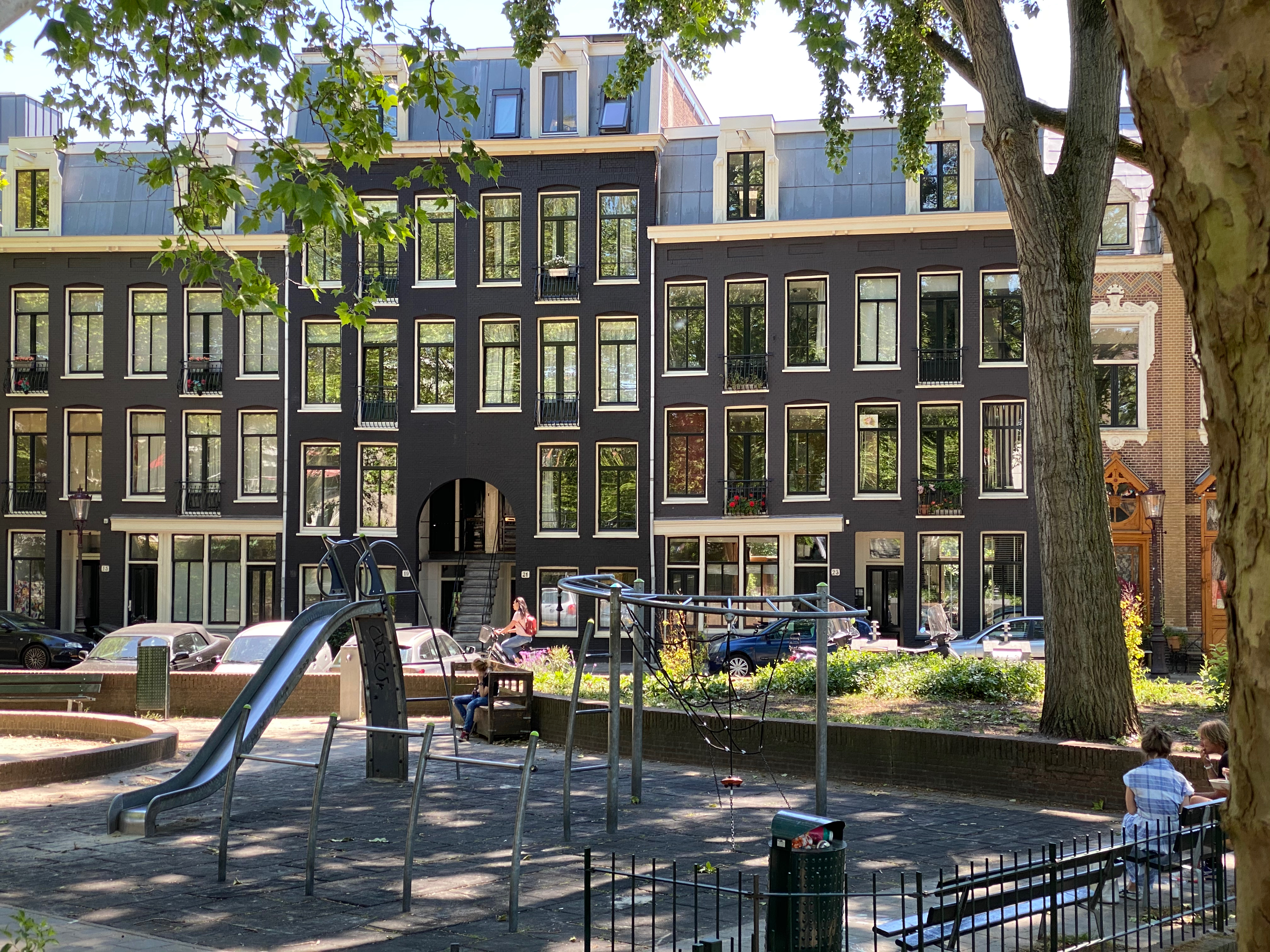
Schinkelhavenstraat

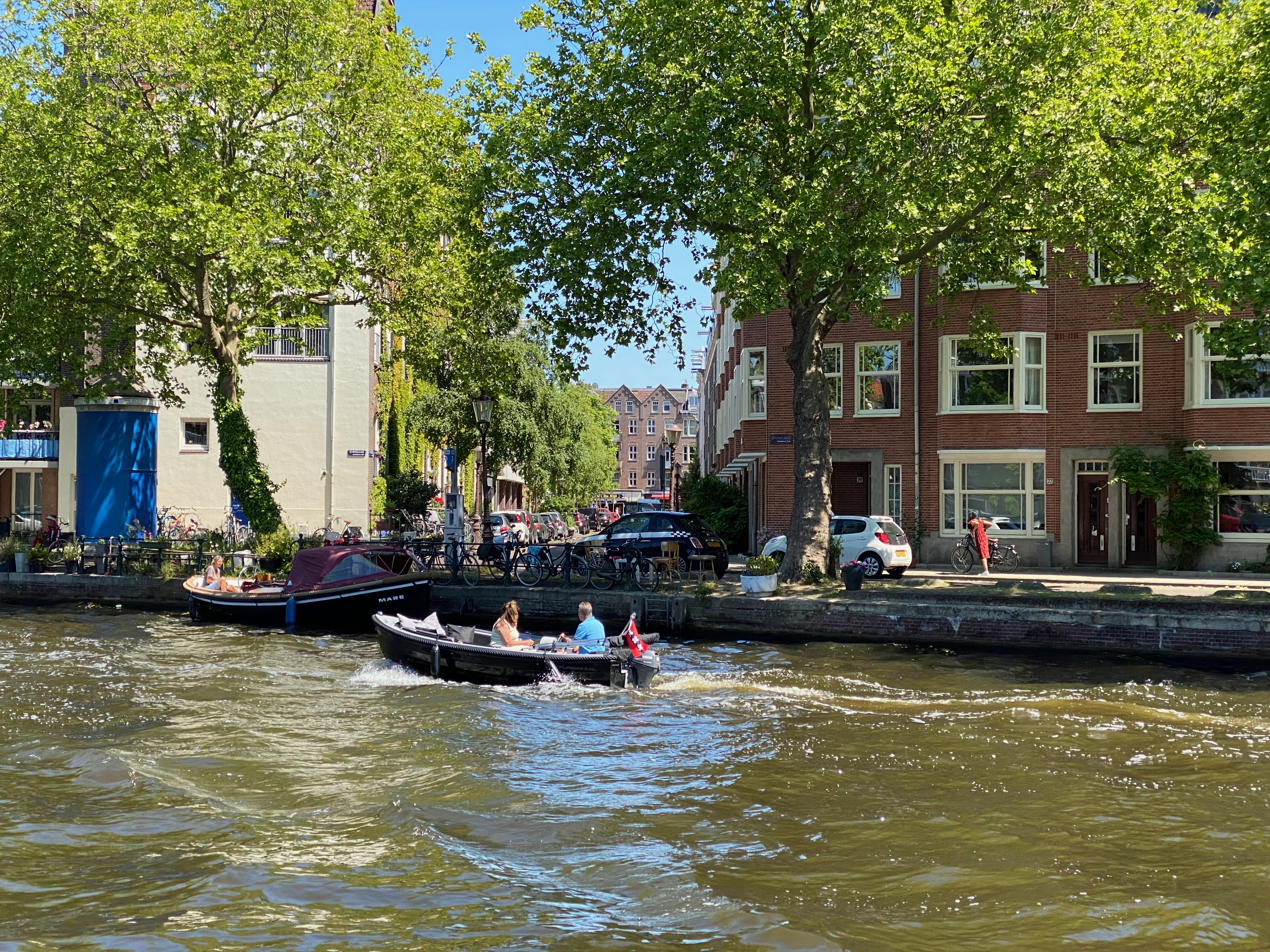
Schinkel River

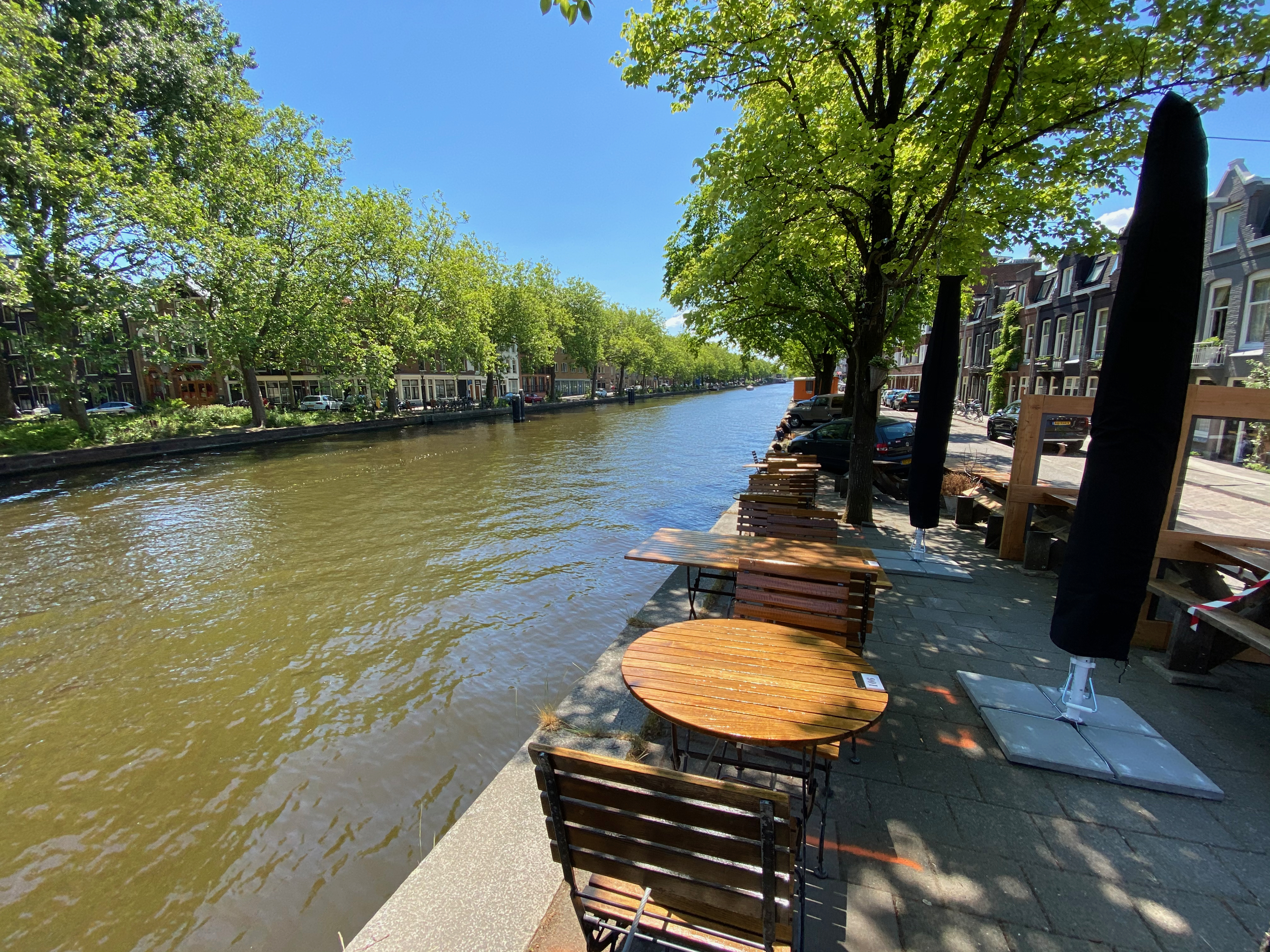
Schinkel River

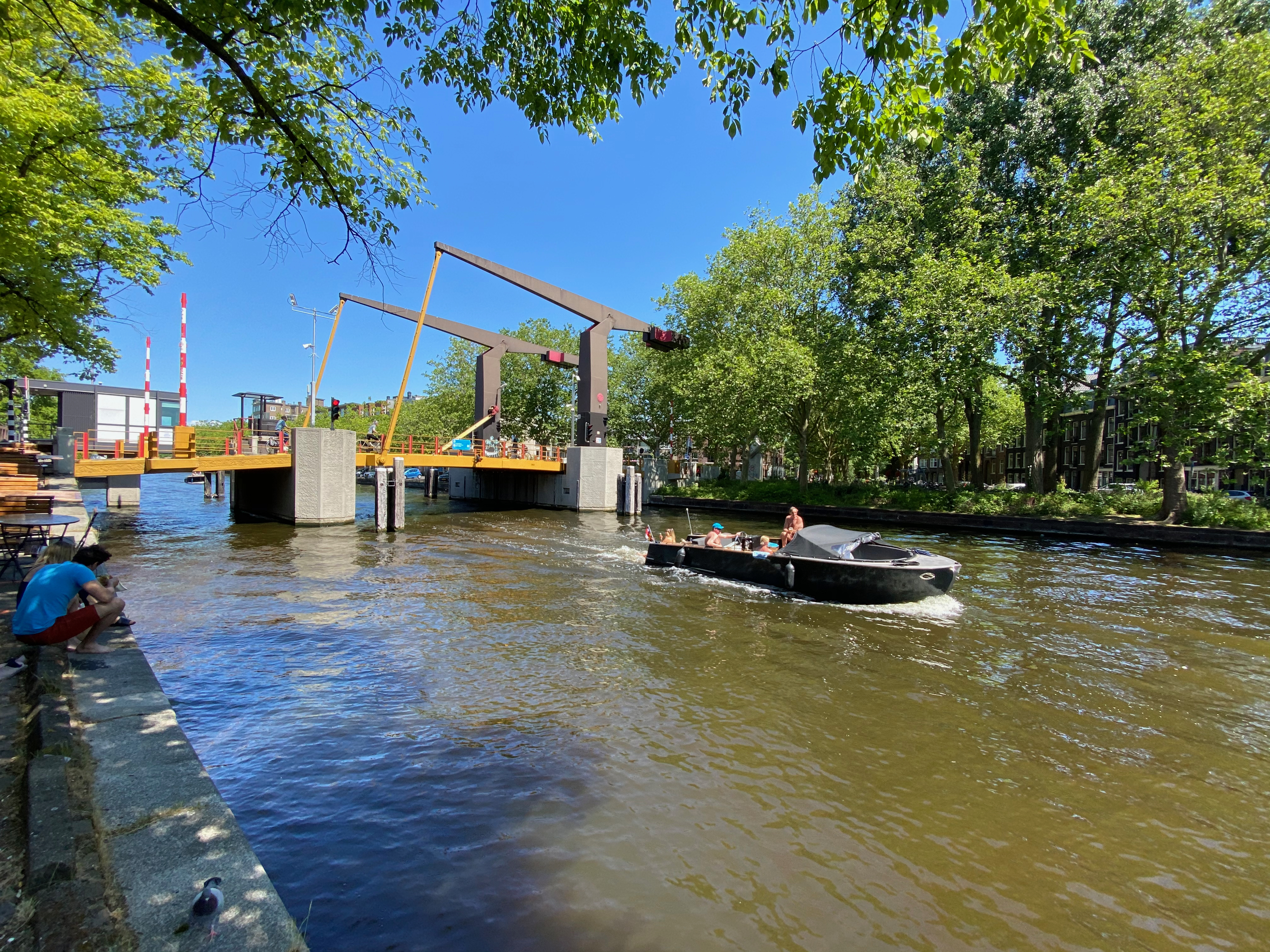
Theophile de Bockbrug, Brug 360

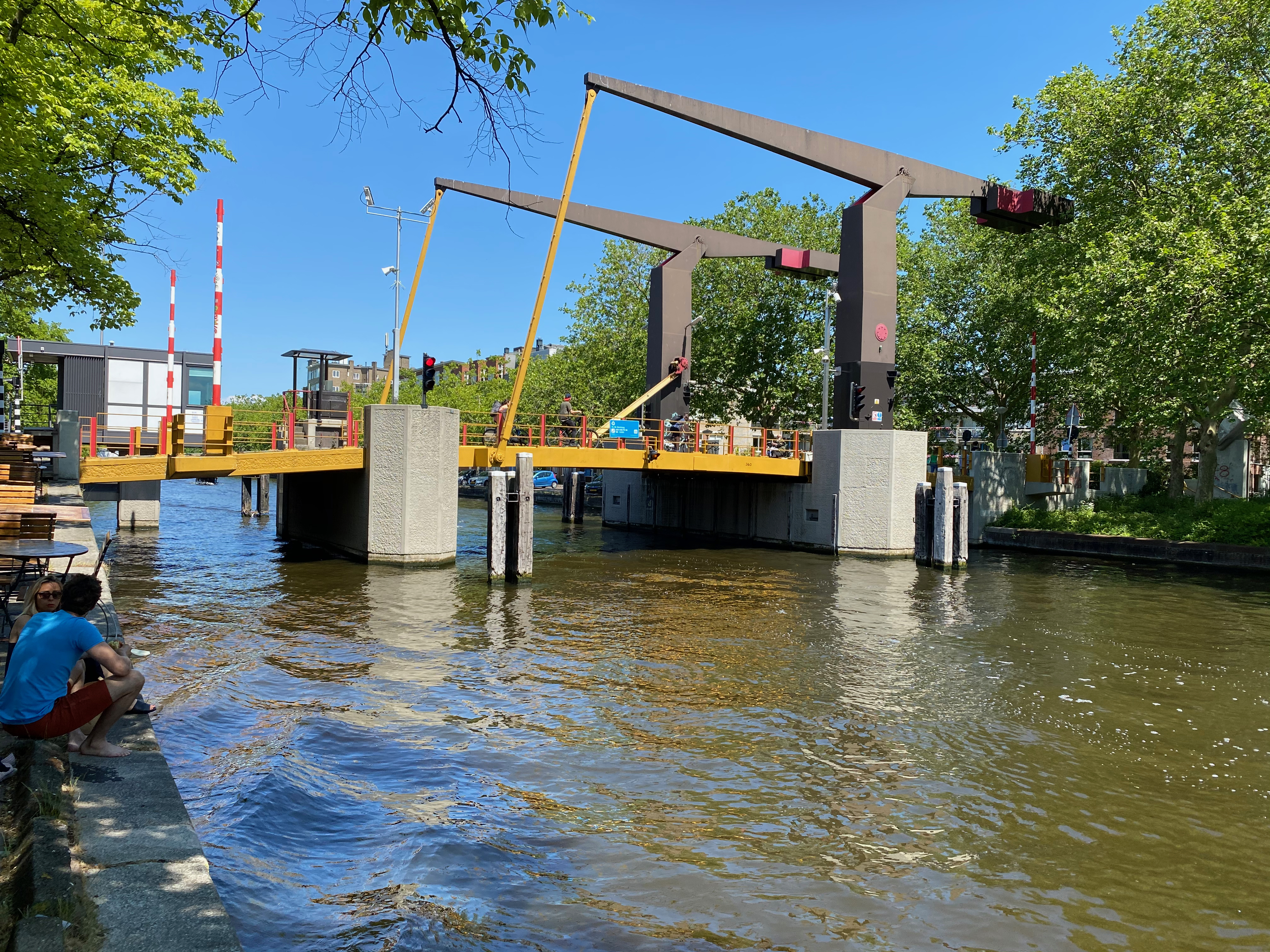
Theophile de Bockbrug, Brug 360

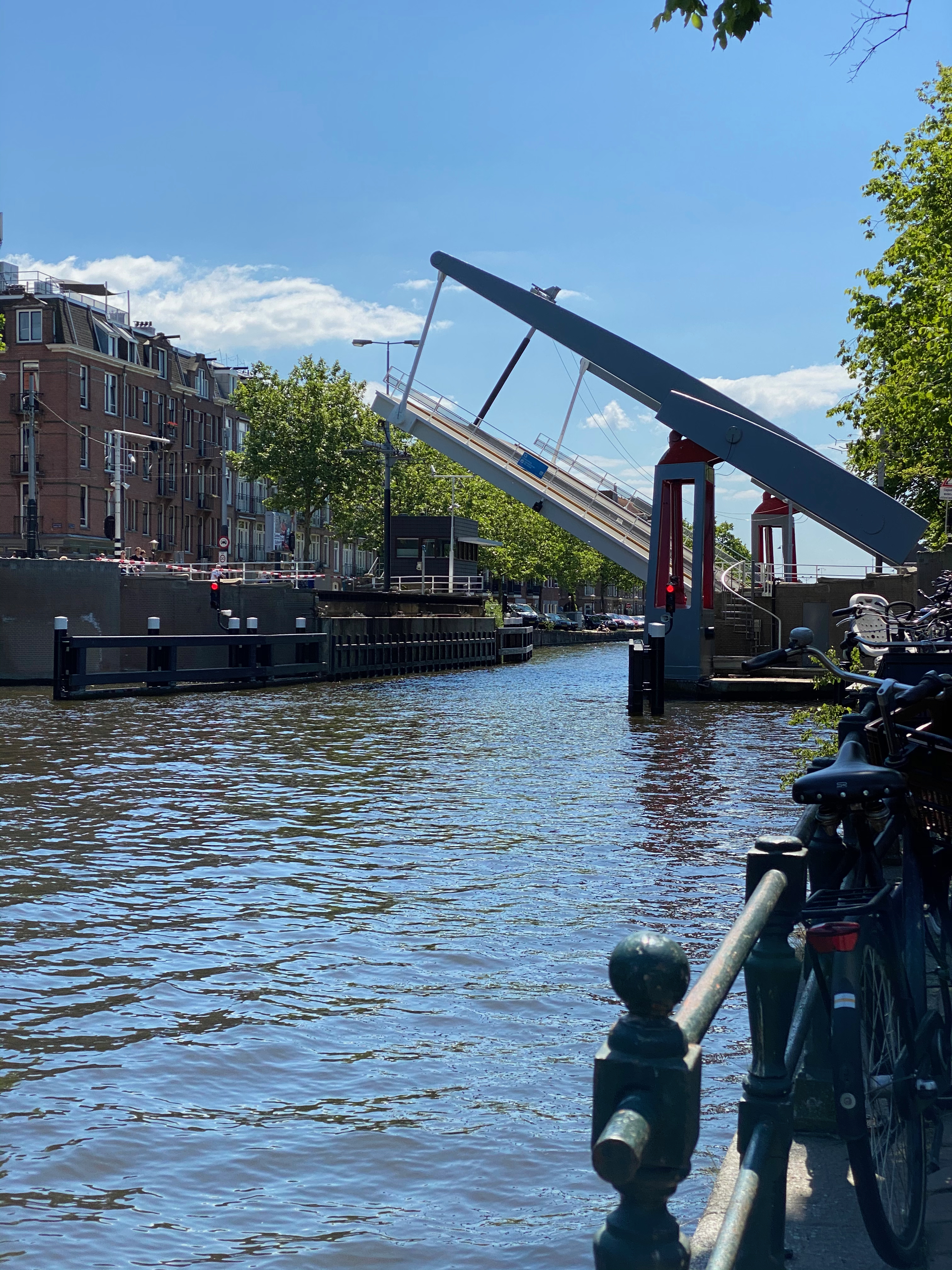
Zelibrug, Brug 348

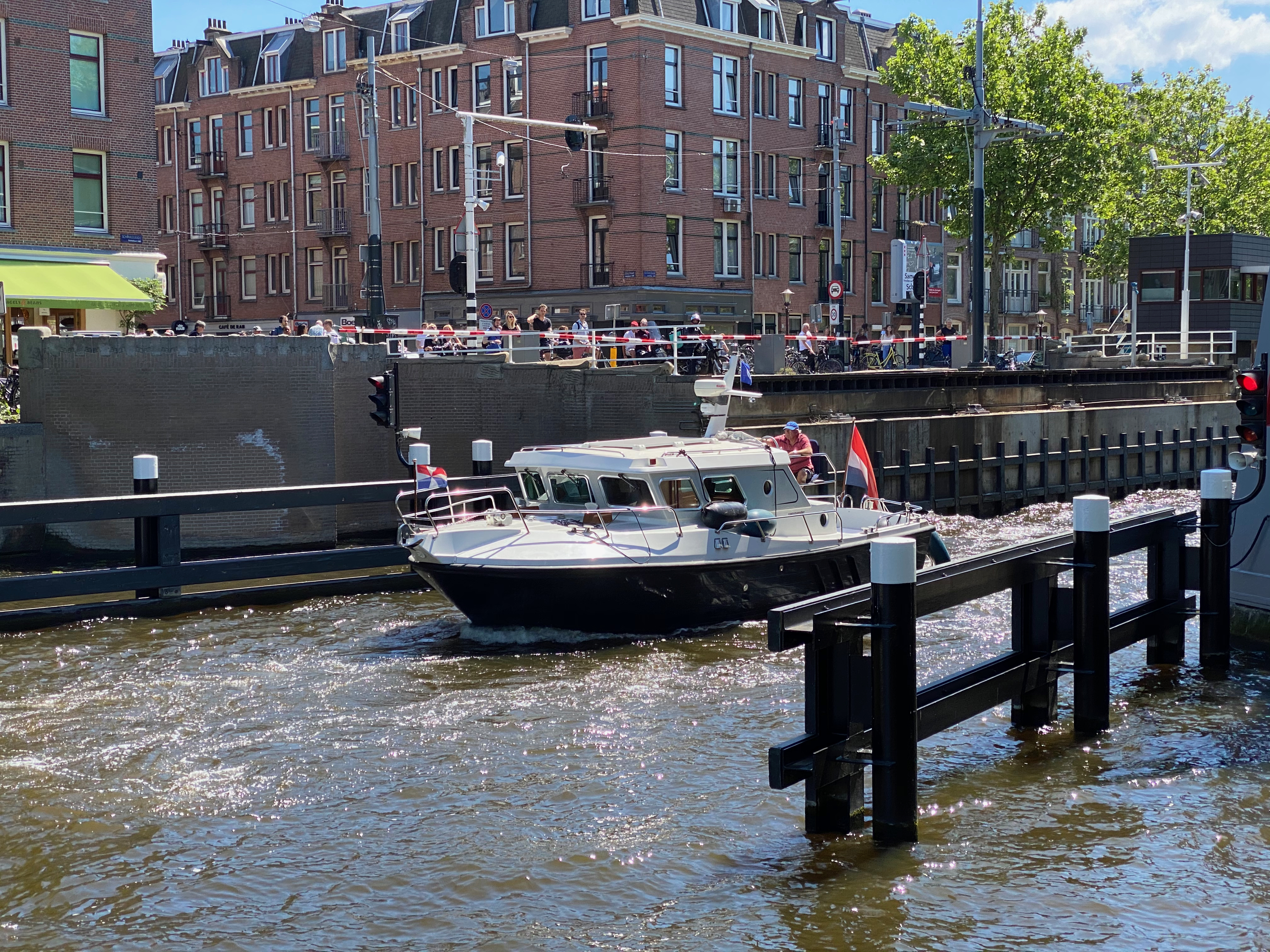
Zelibrug, Brug 348

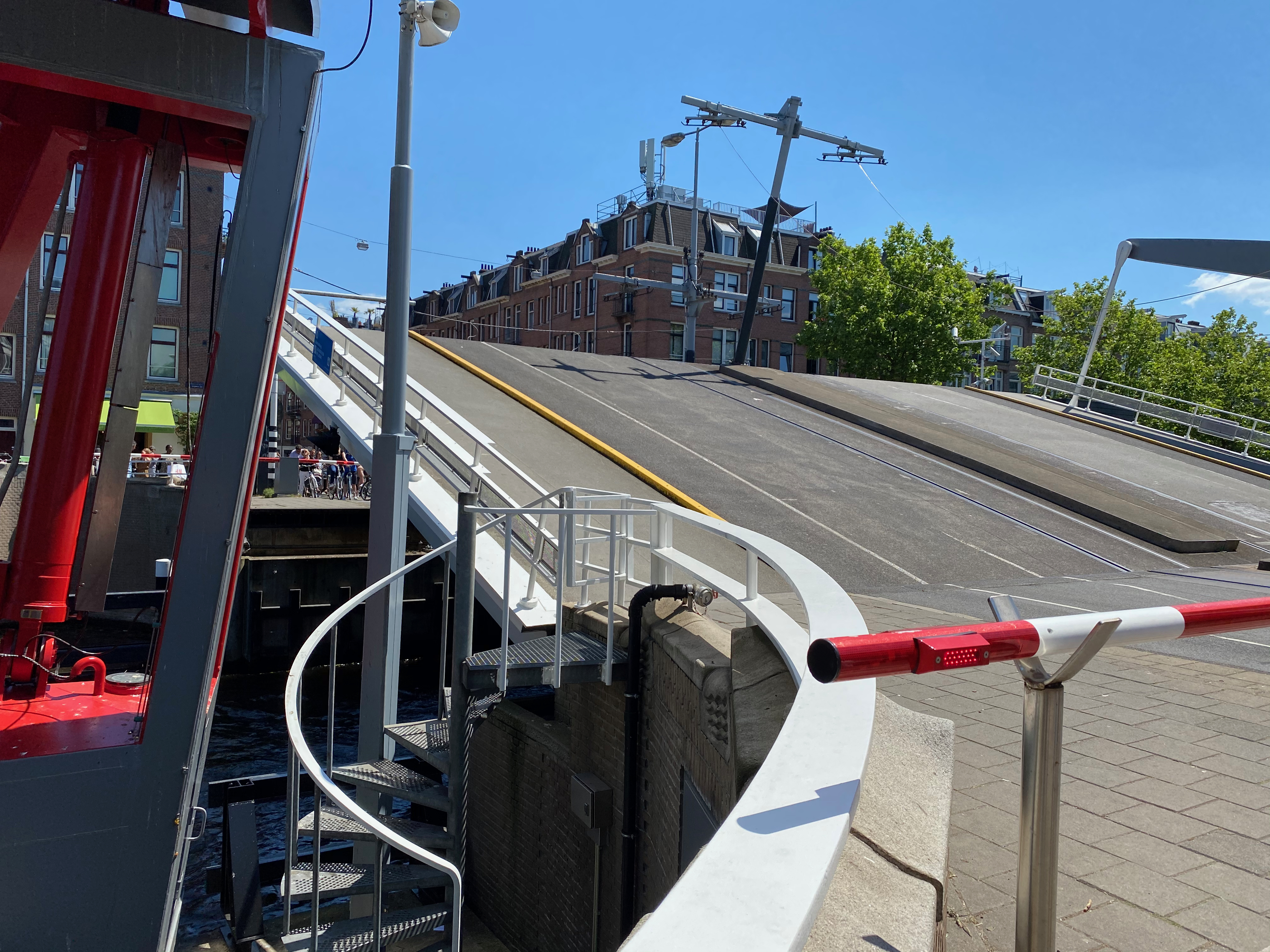
Zelibrug, Brug 348

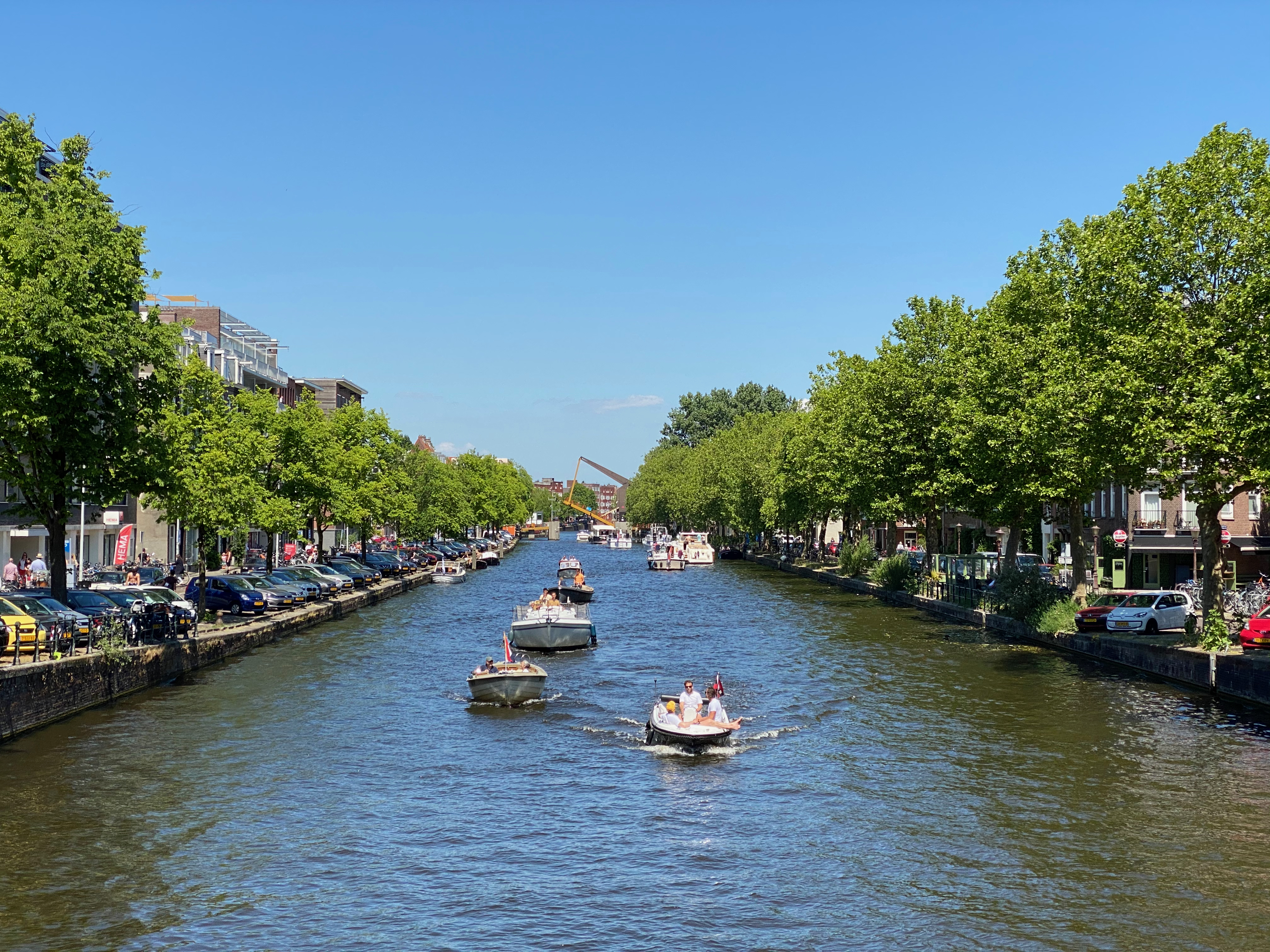
Schinkel River

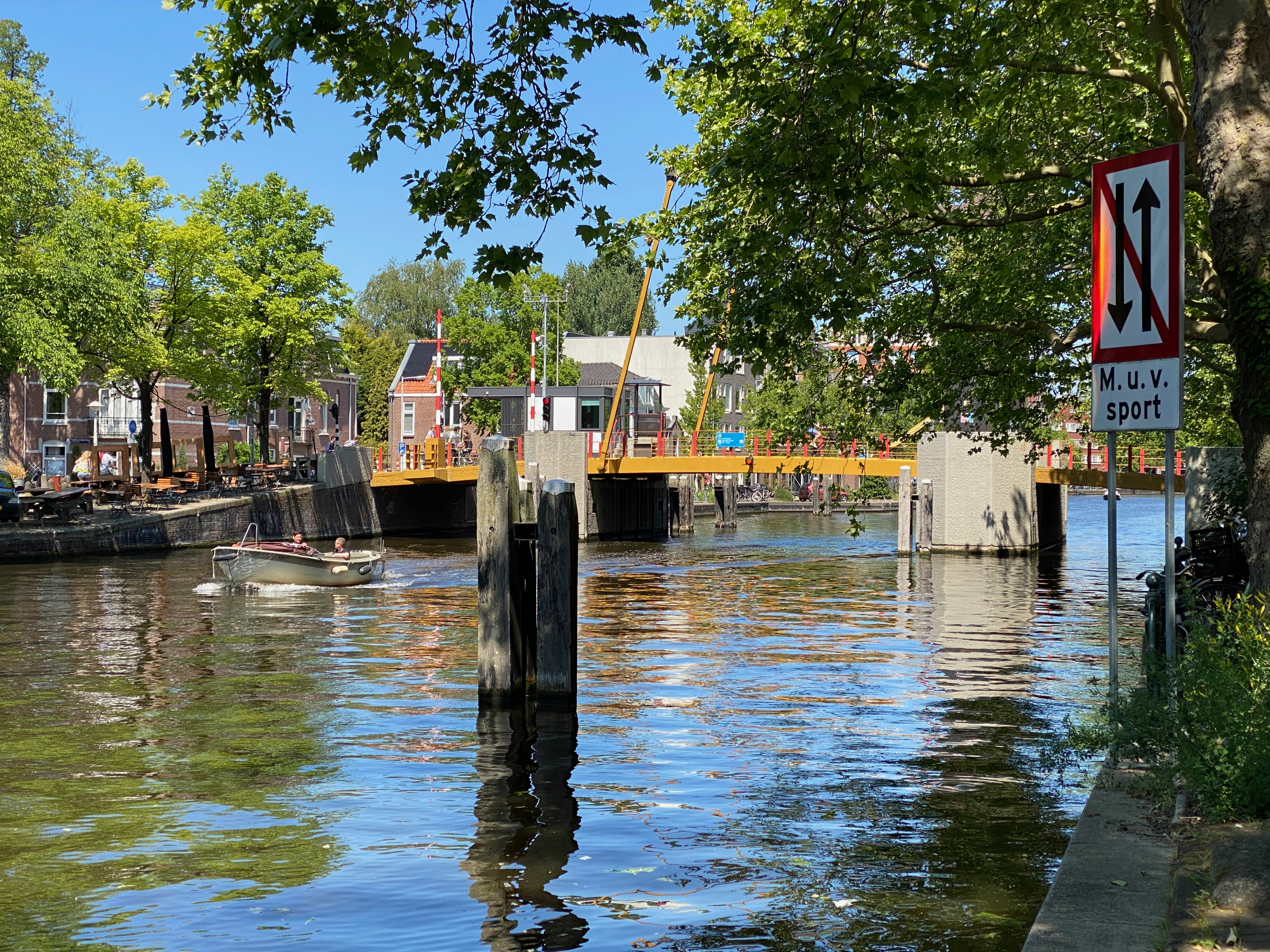
Theophile de Bockbrug, Brug 360

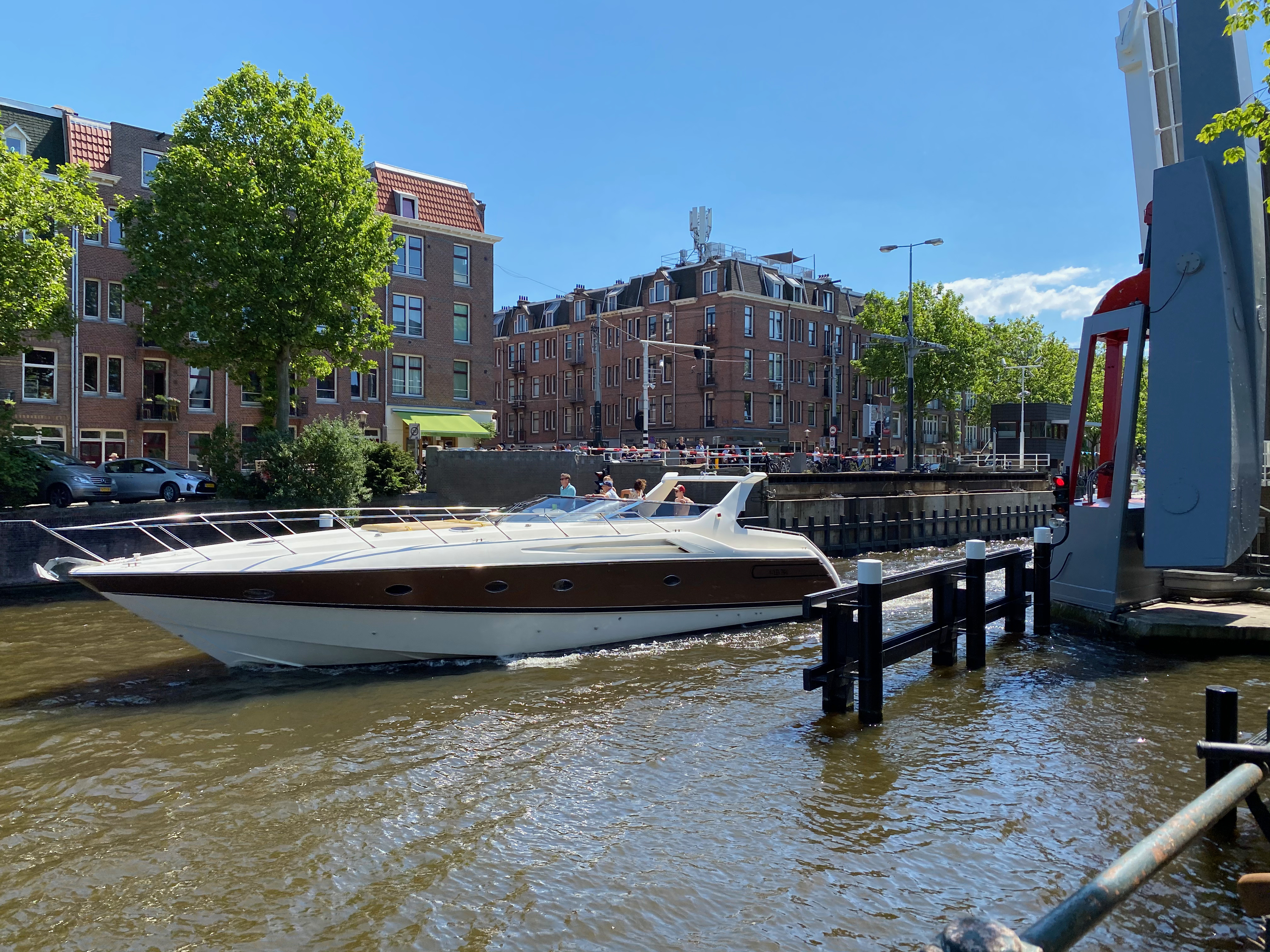
Zelibrug, Brug 348

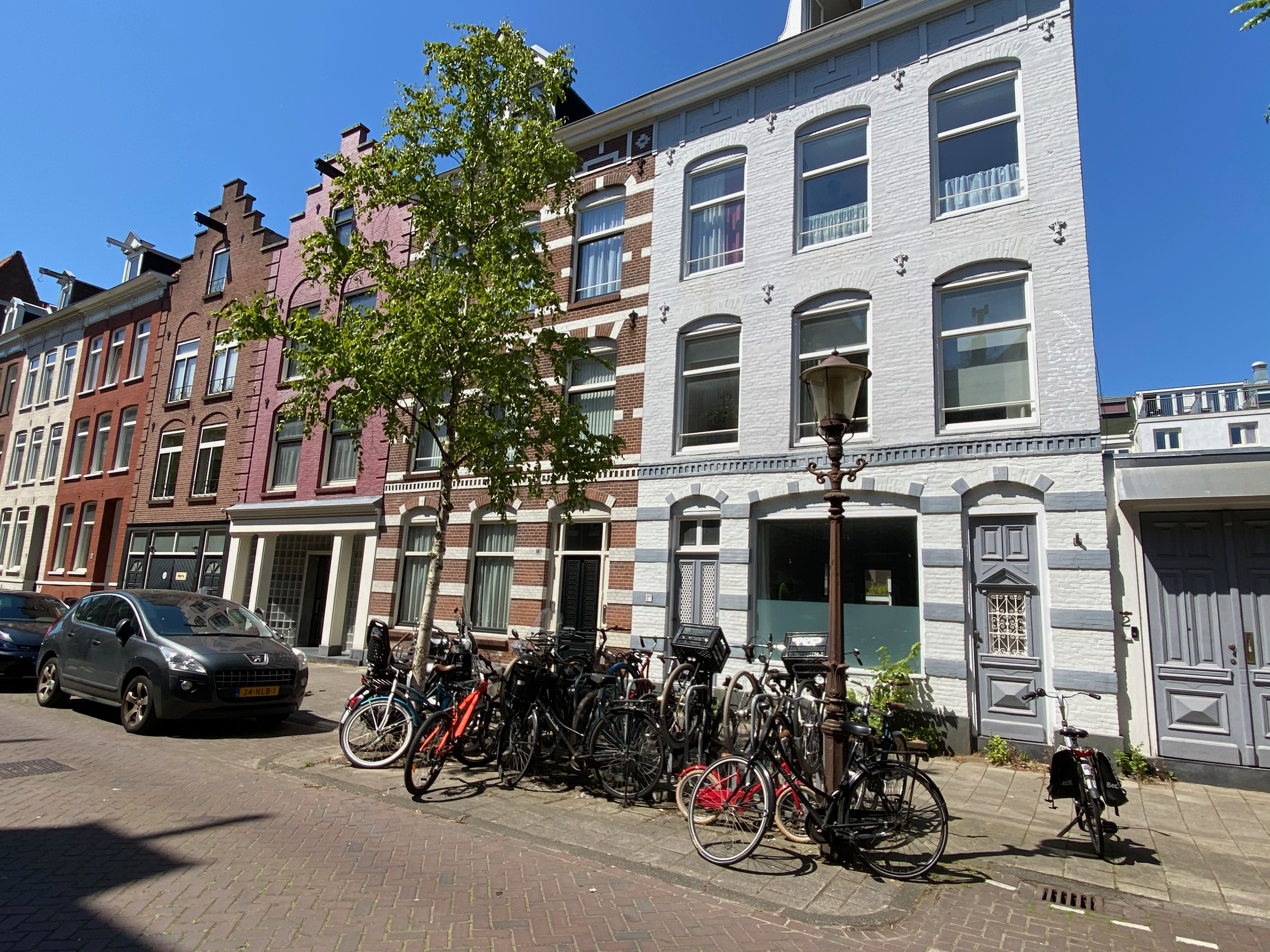
Schinkelstraat
