= Olympisch Kwartier =

Olympisch Kwartier Stadionbuurt
- Neighborhood of Amsterdam
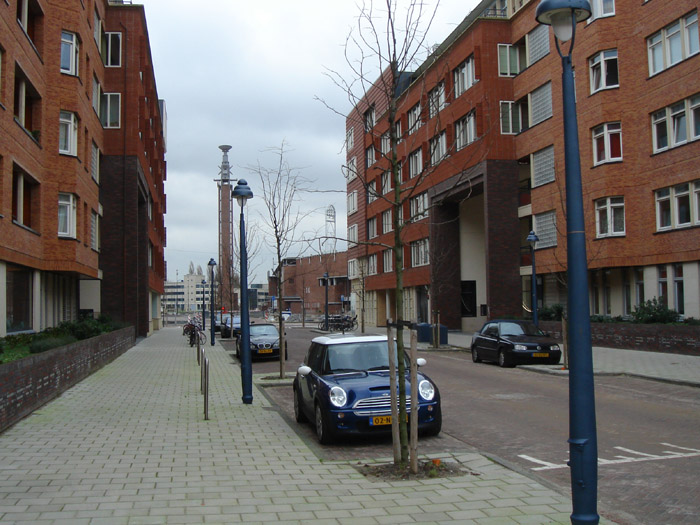
- Rheastraat, Olympisch Kwartier

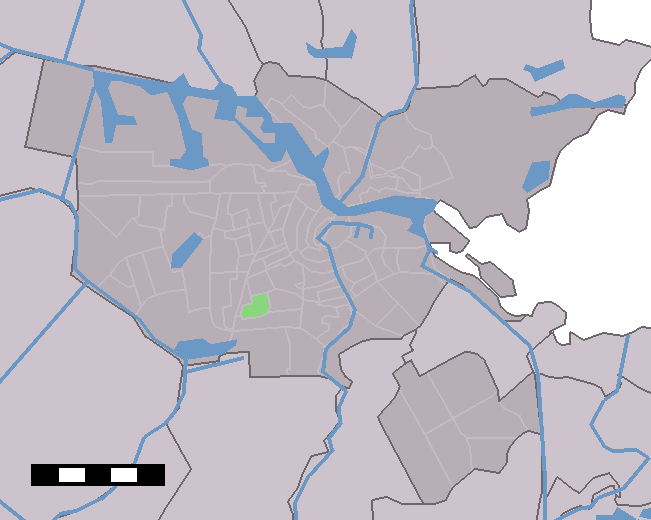
- Map of Stadionbuurt
- Country: Netherlands
- Province: North Holland
- COROP: Amsterdam
- Borough: Zuid
- Time zone: UTC+1 (CET)

Olympisch Kwartier is a neighborhood of Amsterdam, Netherlands. It is a 21st-century residential development north of the Olympic Stadium. The Olympisch Kwartier ('Olympic Quarter') is situated at northwestern end of the 1920s Stadionbuurt neighborhood. It is part of the borough of Amsterdam-Zuid.
