= Hoofddorppleinbuurt =

Coordinates: 52°21′04″N 4°50′59″E

- Neighbourhood of Amsterdam
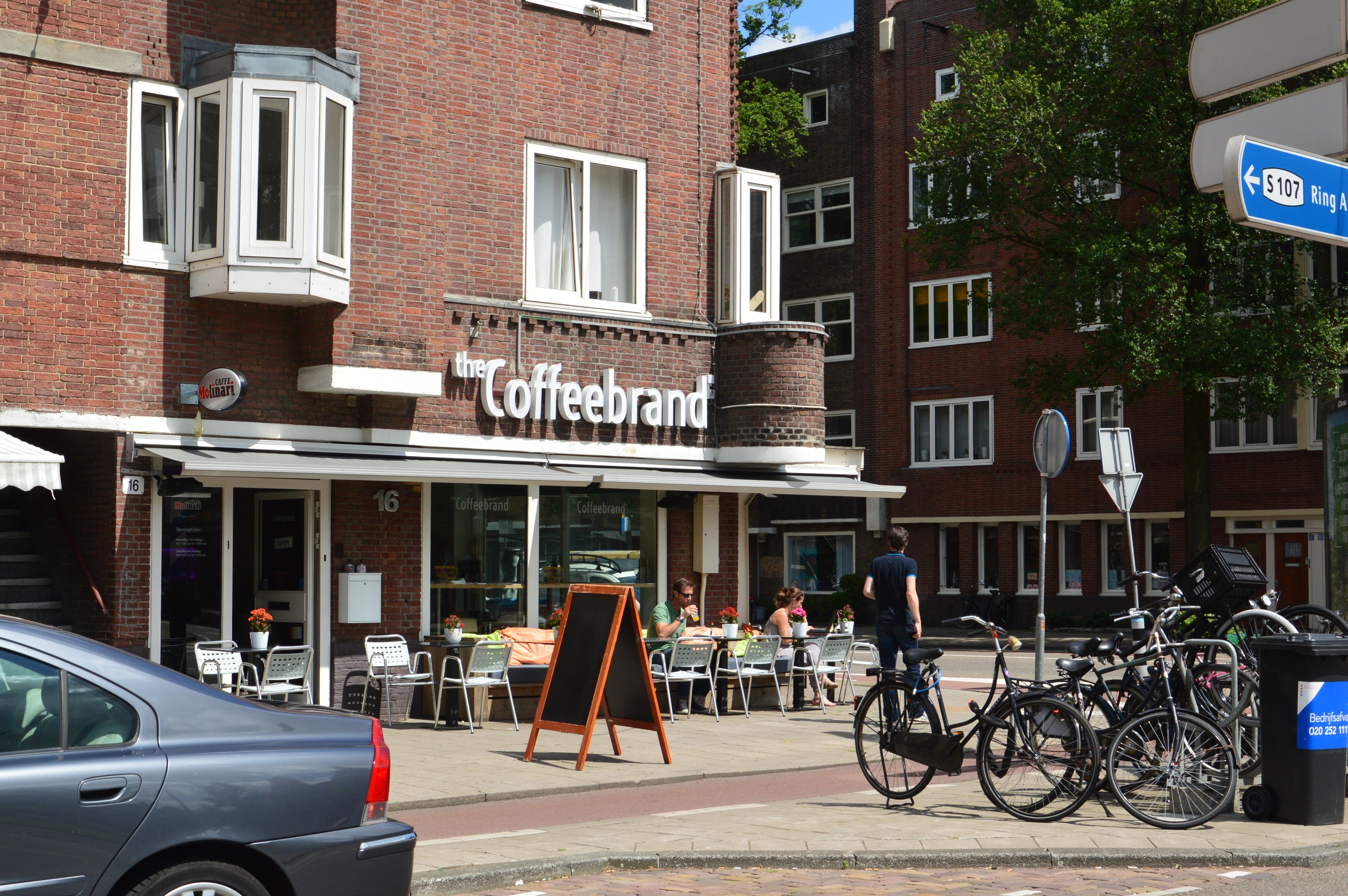

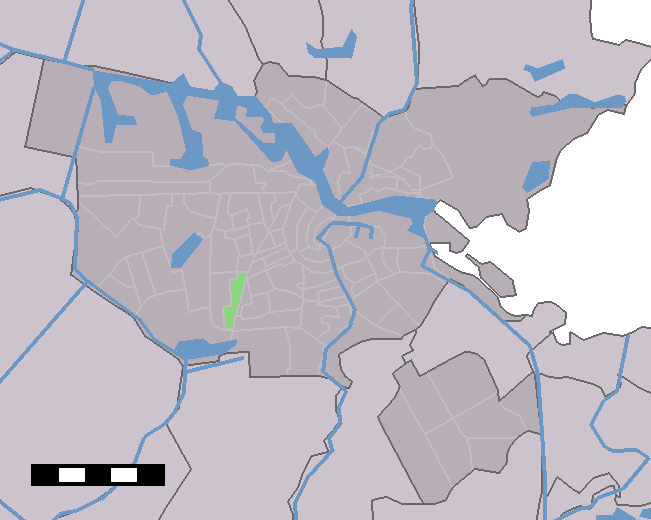
- Country: Netherlands
- Province: North Holland
- COROP: Amsterdam
- Borough: Zuid
- Time zone: UTC+1 (CET)

Hoofddorppleinbuurt (Dutch pronunciation: [ˌɦoːvdɔr(ə)ˈplɛimbyːrt]) is a neighborhood of Amsterdam, Netherlands, part of the borough of Amsterdam-Zuid. The district had 10,771 inhabitants as of 1 January 2005. The total area is 96.71 hectares.

Hoofddorppleinbuurt was built in the 1920s. Since 1927 the neighborhood through the Zeilbrug has been connected to Amstelveenseweg. It is a mostly a residential neighborhood, but there are a few companies and other institutions.
