= Willemspark, Amsterdam =

Willemspark
- Neighborhood of Amsterdam
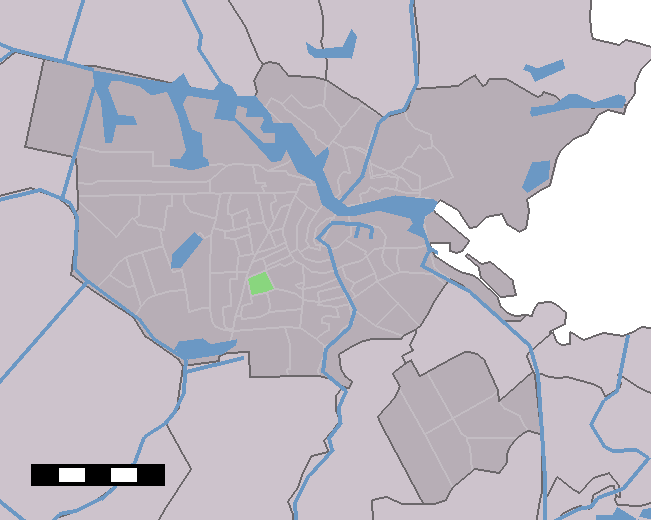
- Coordinates: 52.35333°N 4.863575°E
- Country: Netherlands
- Province: North Holland
- COROP: Amsterdam
- Borough: Zuid
- Time zone: UTC+1 (CET)
- Postal code: 1075

Willemspark is a neighborhood of Amsterdam, Netherlands. It is one of the most expensive neighborhoods of the city.
