= Apollobuurt =

- Neighborhood
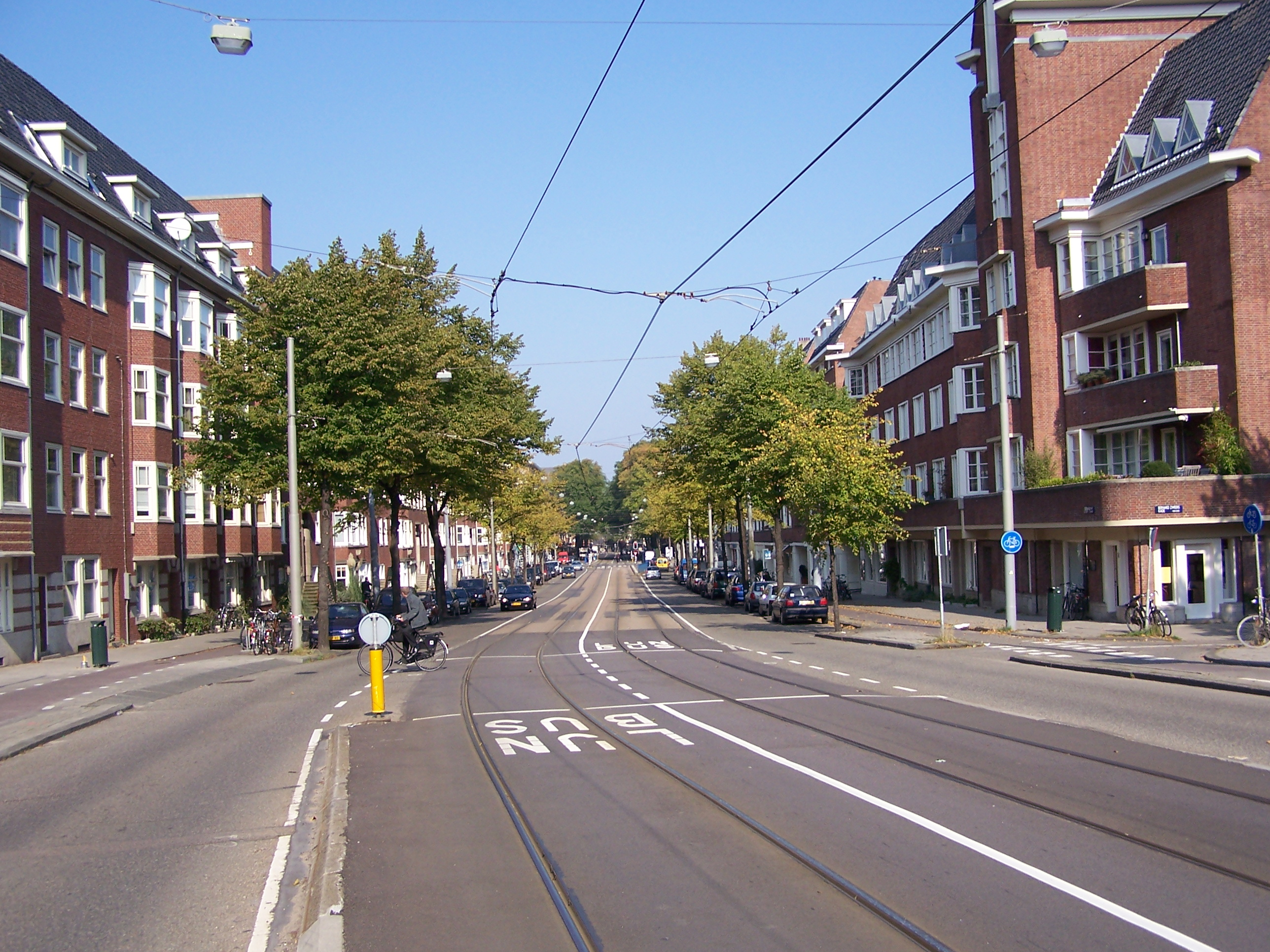
- Beethovenstraat

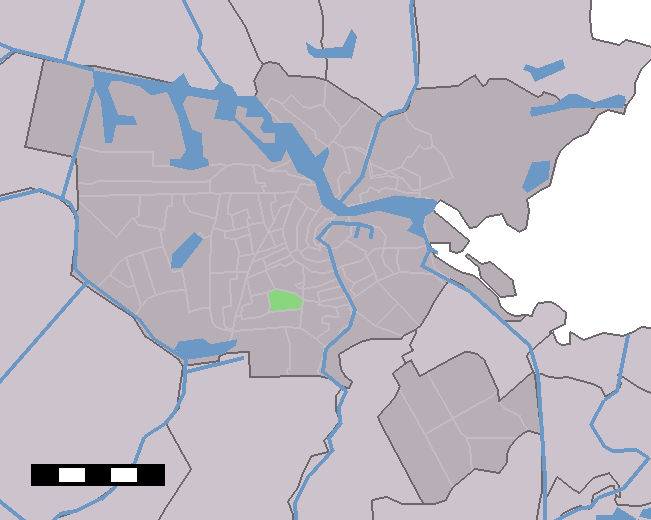
- Location in Amsterdam
- Country: Netherlands
- Province: North Holland
- COROP: Amsterdam
- Borough: Zuid

Population (2014)
  - Total: 8,529
- Time zone: CET (UTC+01)

Apollobuurt is a neighborhood of Amsterdam, Netherlands. It is part of the borough of Amsterdam-Zuid.

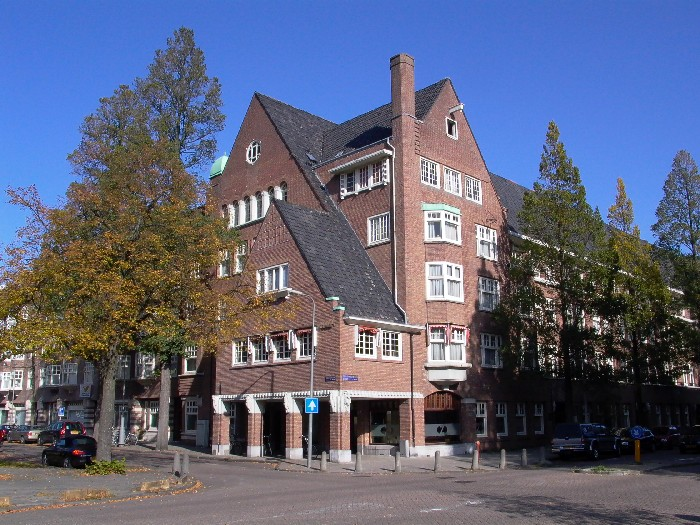

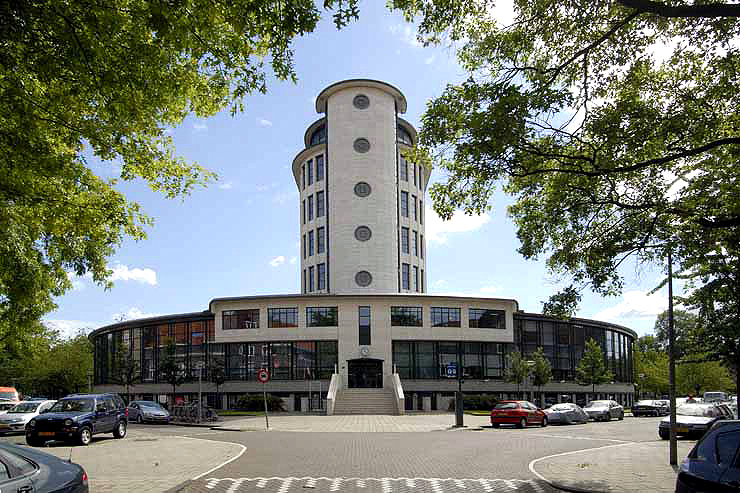
Allen & Overy Netherlands is located in Apollo House, Apollobuurt.

The neighborhood is characterized by a spacious and luxurious design. The streets are named after Greek legends, painters and composers. The main east–west streets are Apollolaan and Stadionweg, the main shopping street is Beethovenstraat. Apollobuurt is bounded by: Noorder Amstelkanaal (extended) Boerenwetering, Diepenbrockstraat (including the parcels to the south), Zuider Amstelkanaal, Parnassusweg and Olympiaplein (south and east). The Amsterdam Hilton Hotel is located in this district where John Lennon and Yoko Ono had their "Bed-In" for Peace in 1969 and the artist Herman Brood jumped to his death in 2001.
