= Museumkwartier =

Museumkwartier Museum Quarter
- Neighborhood of Amsterdam
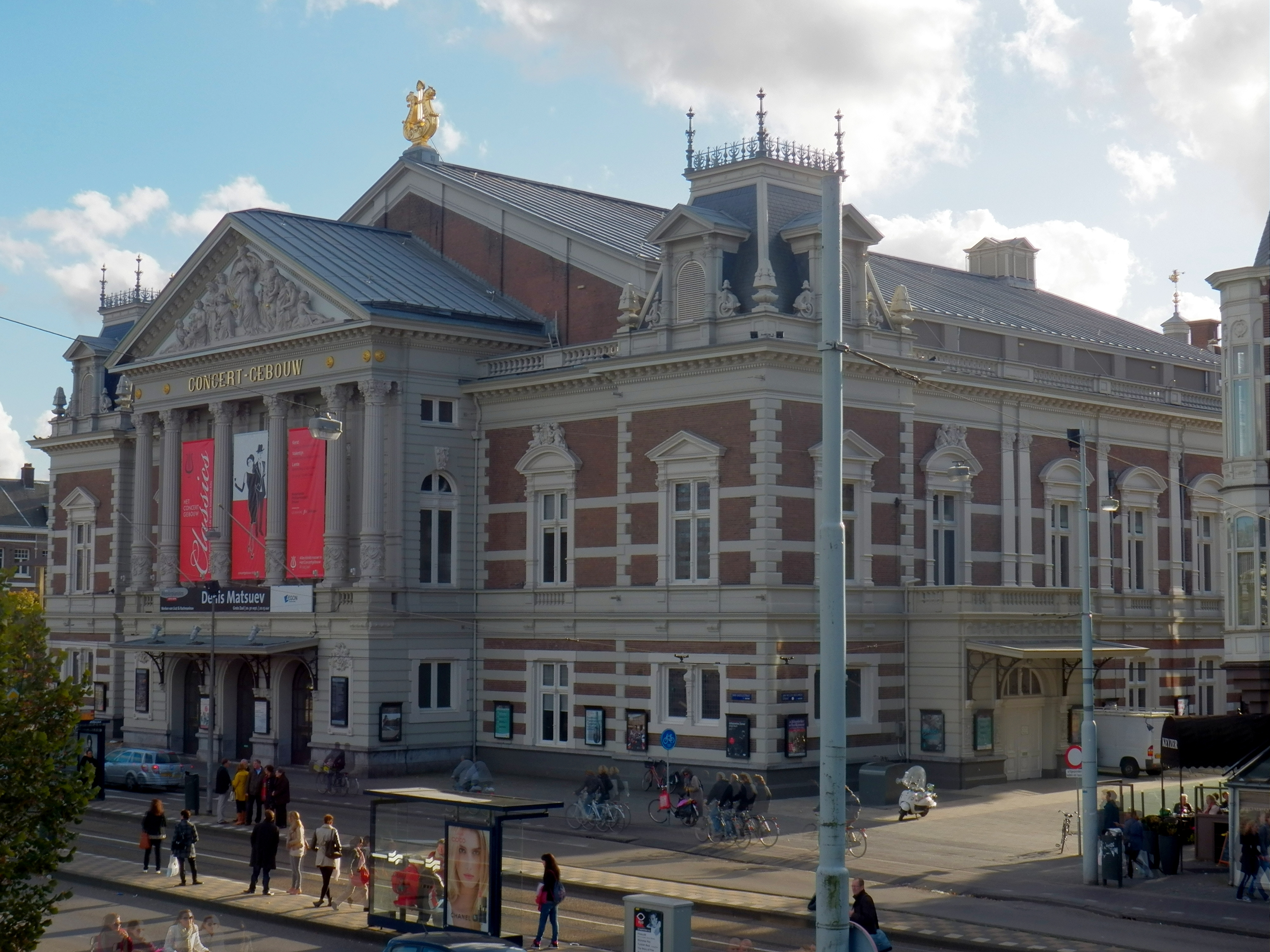
- Concertgebouw, Museumplein.

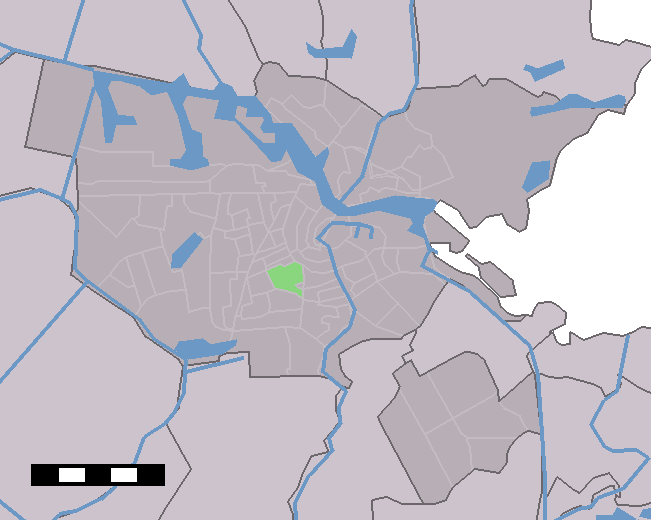
- Country: Netherlands
- Province: North Holland
- COROP: Amsterdam
- Borough: Zuid
- Time zone: UTC+1 (CET)

Museumkwartier (the Museum Quarter) is a neighbourhood of Amsterdam, Netherlands, located in the borough of Amsterdam-Zuid.

It is bordered by the Stadhouderskade, Vondelpark, Emmastraat, Reinier Vinkeleskade and the Hobbemakade.

The area was developed following the construction of the Rijksmuseum.The neighbourhood takes its name from the major museums at Museumplein; the Rijksmuseum, the Stedelijk Museum and Van Gogh Museum. Other attractions in the area include the Concertgebouw and the Vondelpark.

== Transport ==
The tram lines 2, 3, 5, 12, 16 and 24 pass through the neighbourhood.
