= Duivelseiland =

- Neighborhood of Amsterdam
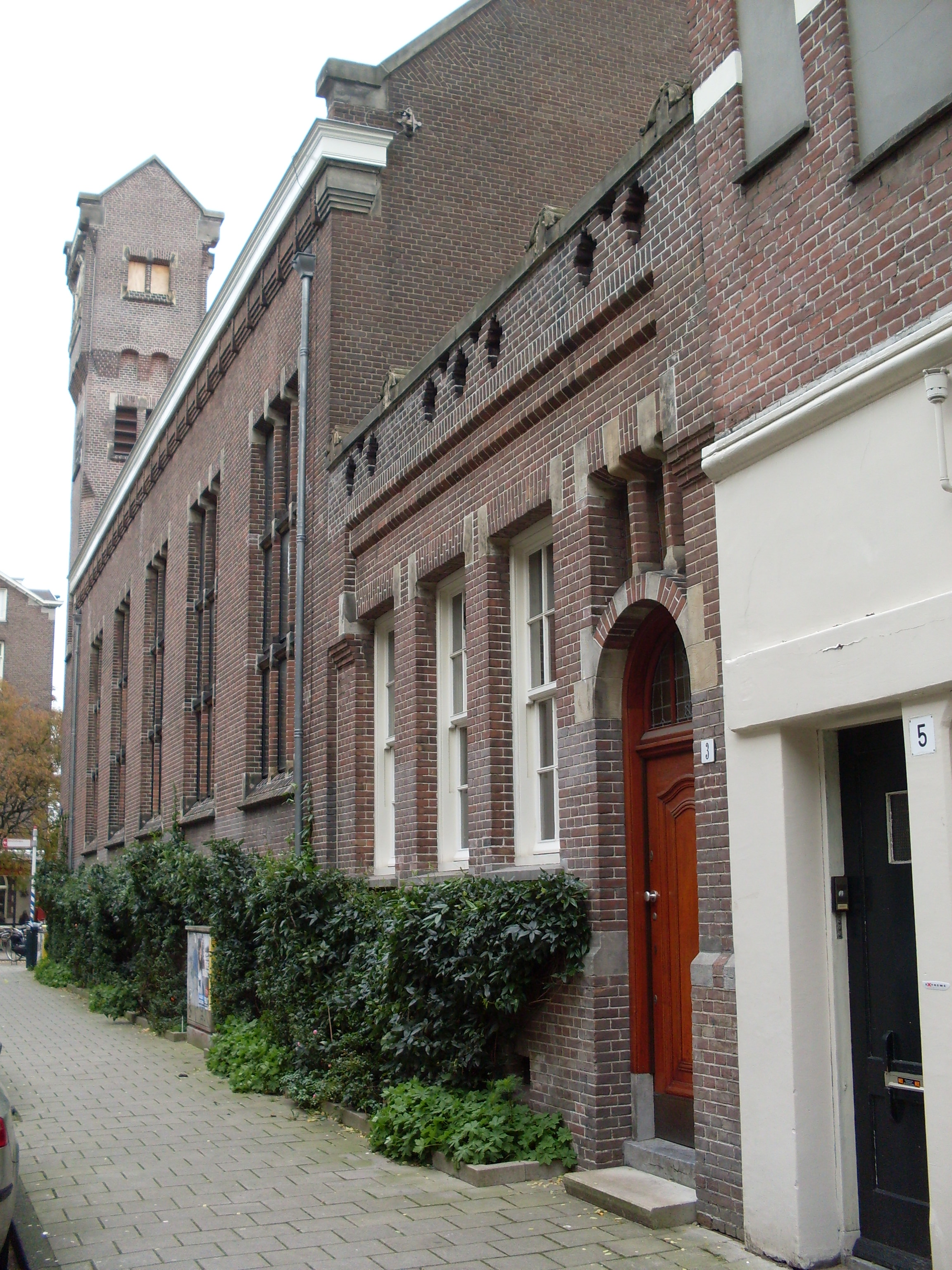
- Pieter Basstraat

- Coordinates: 52.353425°N 4.884689°E
- Country: Netherlands
- Province: North Holland
- COROP: Amsterdam
- Borough: Zuid
- Time zone: UTC+1 (CET)

Duivelseiland (Dutch pronunciation: [ˈdœyvəlsˌɛilɑnt]; lit. 'Devil's island') is a neighborhood of Amsterdam, Netherlands.
