= Stadionbuurt =

- Neighborhood of Amsterdam
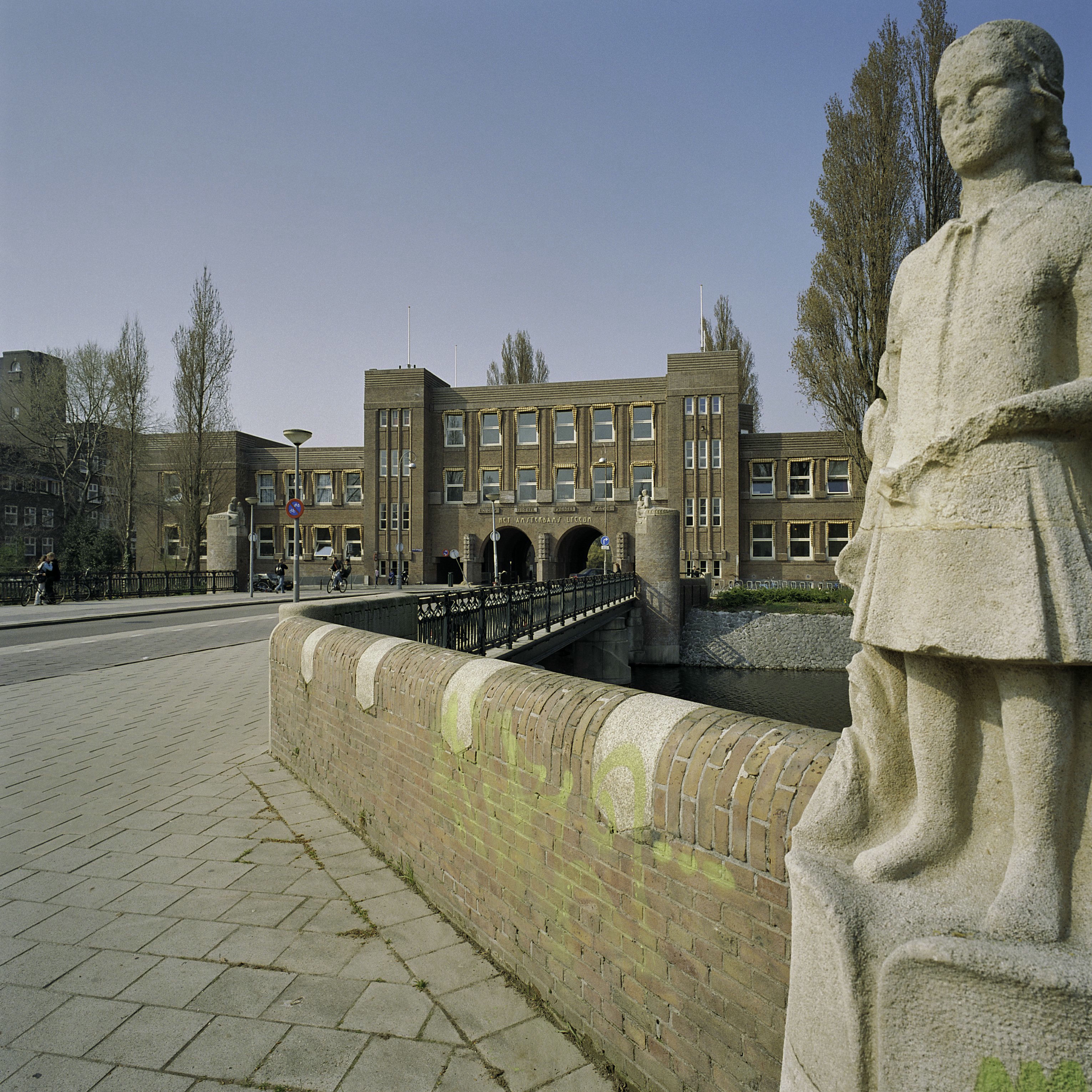
- Amsterdams Lyceum, Olympiaplein

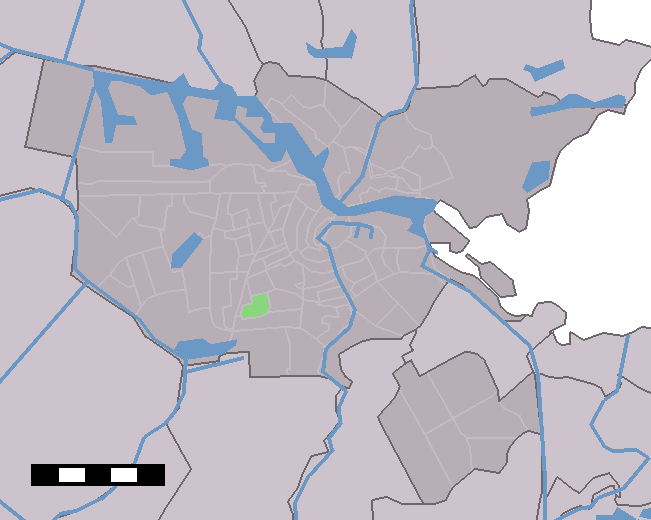
- Coordinates: 52.348°N 4.867°E
- Country: Netherlands
- Province: North Holland
- COROP: Amsterdam
- Borough: Zuid
- Time zone: UTC+1 (CET)

Stadionbuurt (Dutch pronunciation: [ˈstaːdijɔmˌbyːrt]) is a neighborhood of Amsterdam, Netherlands.

== Public transport ==
Stadionbuurt can be reached by tram lines 16 and 24 (as of October 2012). Tram 24 stops at Stadionweg and tram 16 at Stadionplein.
