= Prinses Irenebuurt =

- Neighborhood of Amsterdam
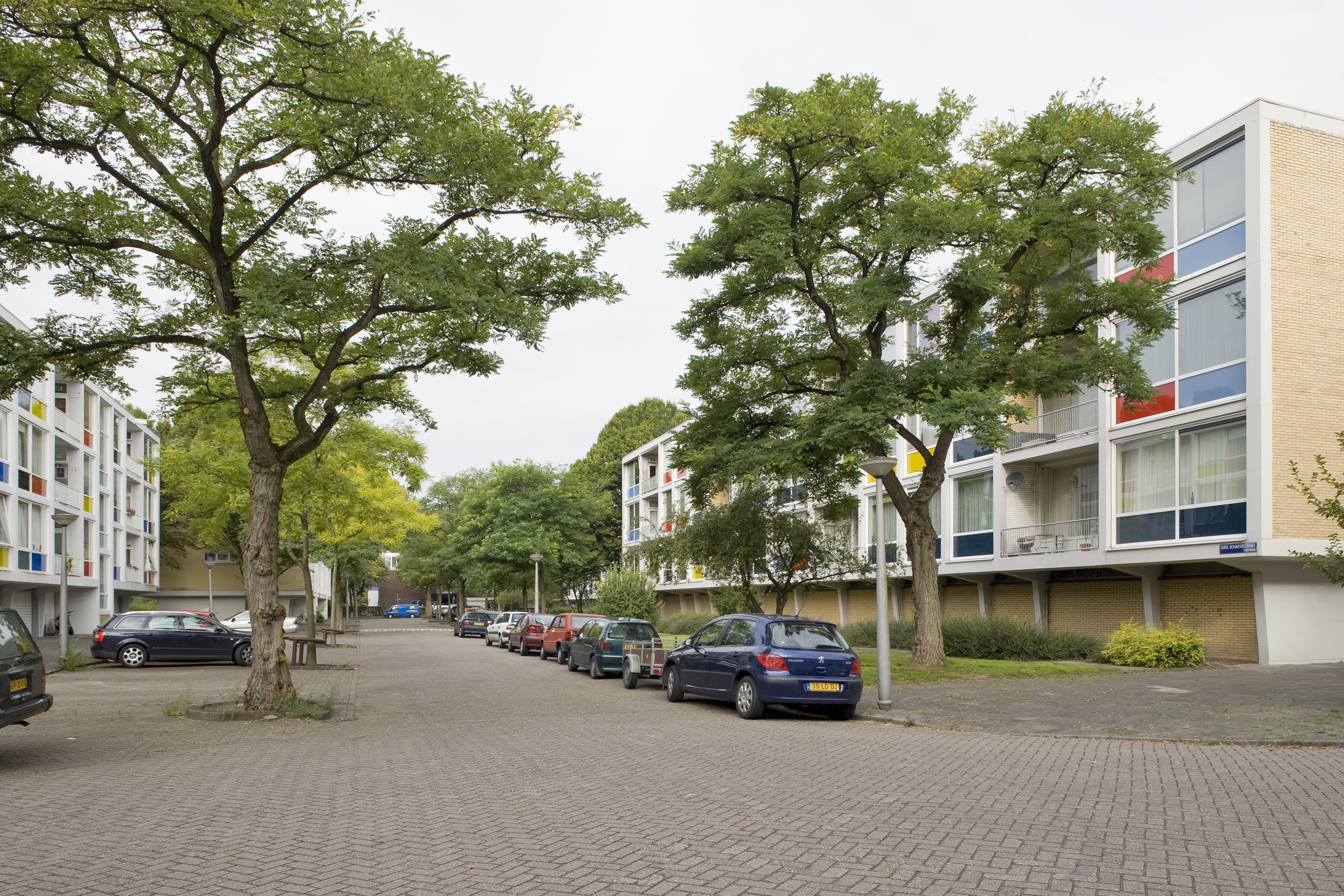
- Warnersblokken ('Warner's Blocks') (1957).

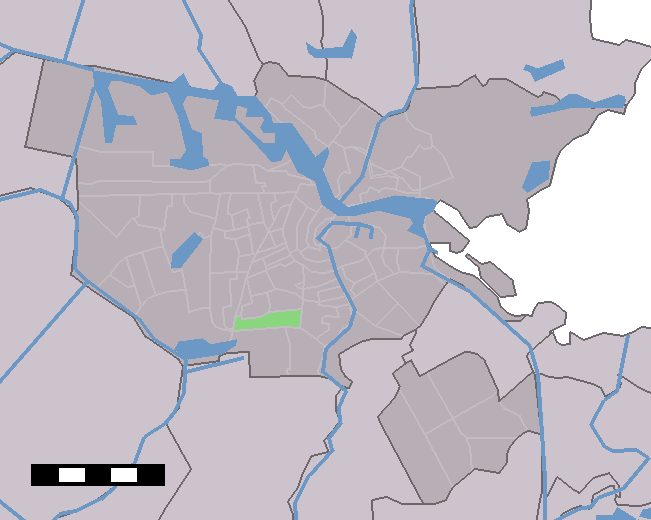

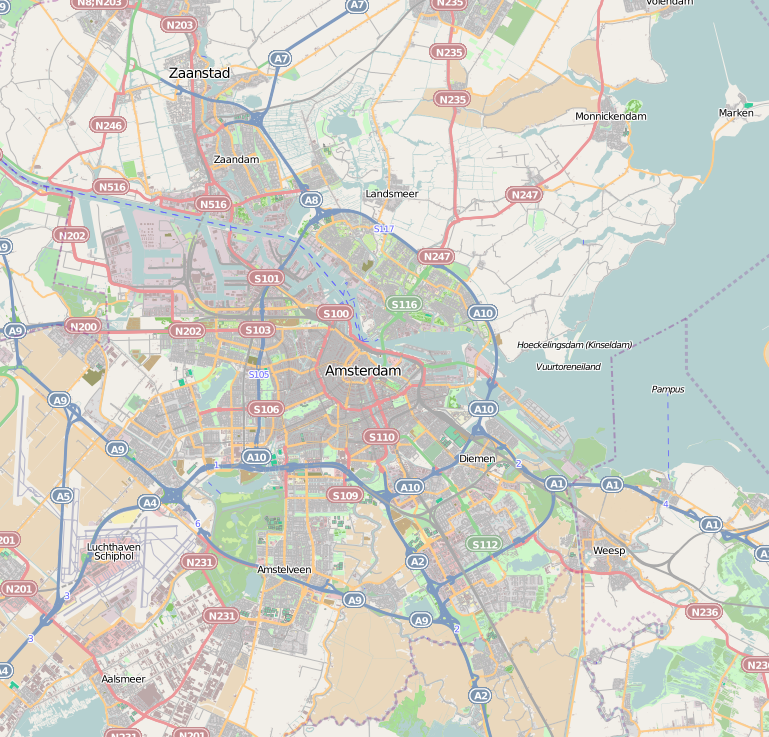
- Location within Greater Amsterdam Location within North Holland Location within Netherlands
- Country: Netherlands
- Province: North Holland
- COROP: Amsterdam
- Borough: Zuid
- Time zone: UTC+1 (CET)

Prinses Irenebuurt is a neighborhood of Amsterdam, Netherlands.
