= Diamantbuurt =

Coordinates: 52°21′03″N 4°54′23″E

- Neighborhood of Amsterdam
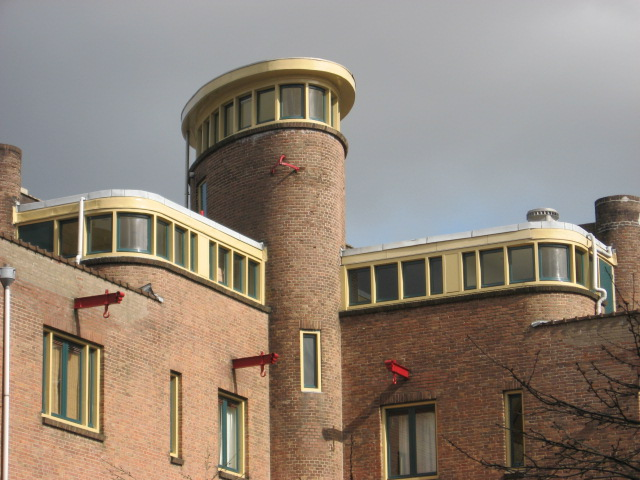

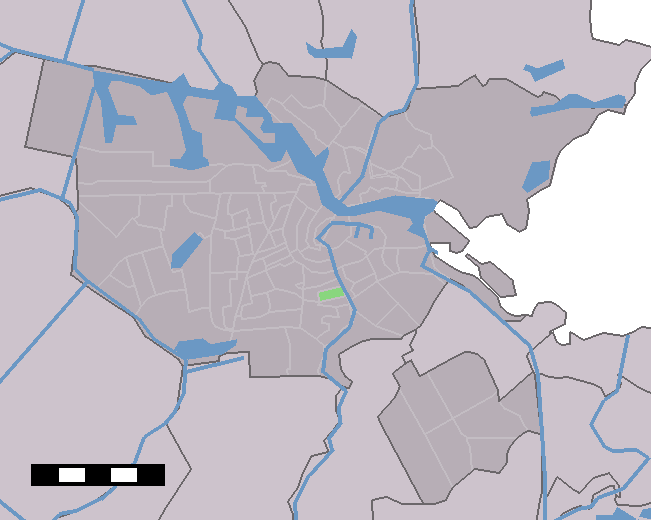
- Country: Netherlands
- Province: North Holland
- COROP: Amsterdam
- Borough: Zuid
- Time zone: UTC+1 (CET)

The Diamantbuurt is a neighborhood of Amsterdam, The Netherlands. It was built in the 1930s. It has streets named after precious stones: Diamantstraat, Robijnstraat, Saffierstraat, Smaragdstraat, Topaasstraat and Granaatstraat. These days the Diamantbuurt includes the area enclosed by the Tweede van der Helststraat, Karel du Jardinstraat, Henrick de Keijserplein, Tolstraat, Amstel, and Amstelkanaal. It has many special buildings and monuments, like social housing in the Amsterdam School style of architecture.
