= Amsterdam-Oost =

Coordinates: 52°21′10″N 4°55′50″E

- Borough of Amsterdam
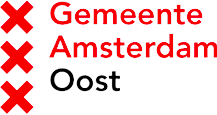
- Brandmark

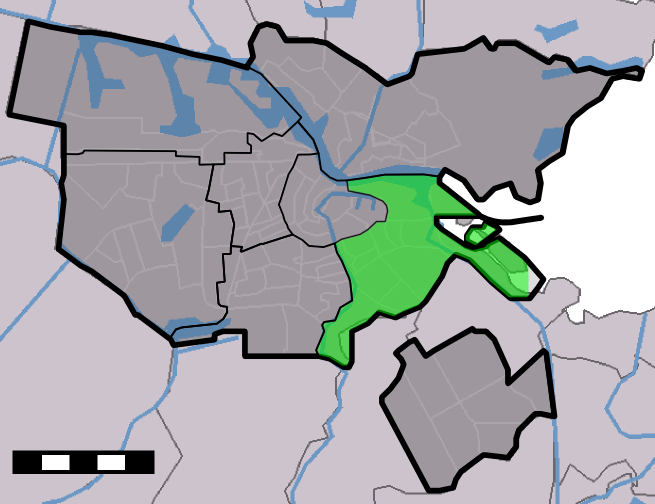
- Country: Netherlands
- Province: North Holland
- COROP: Amsterdam

Area
  - Total: 30.56 km^{2} (11.80 sq mi)

Population
  - Total: 128,690
  - Density: 4,211/km^{2} (10,910/sq mi)
- Time zone: UTC+1 (CET)
- Website: https://www.amsterdam.nl/stadsdelen/oost/

Amsterdam-Oost (Dutch pronunciation: [ˌɑmstərdɑmˈoːst]) is a borough of Amsterdam, Netherlands, established in May 2010 after a merger of the former boroughs of Zeeburg and Oost-Watergraafsmeer. In 2013, the borough had almost 123,000 inhabitants.

== History ==
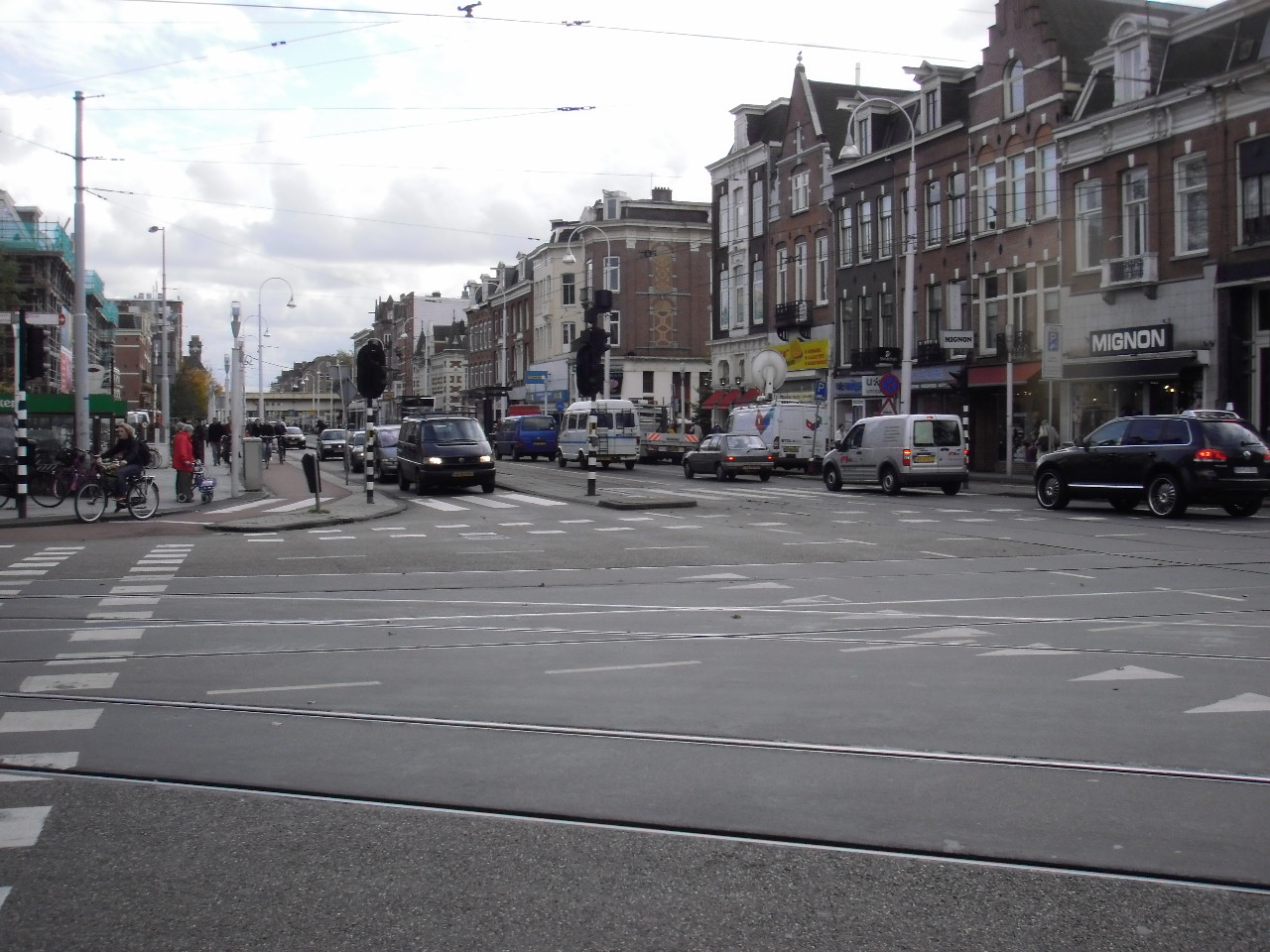
Linnaeusstraat, Oosterparkbuurt

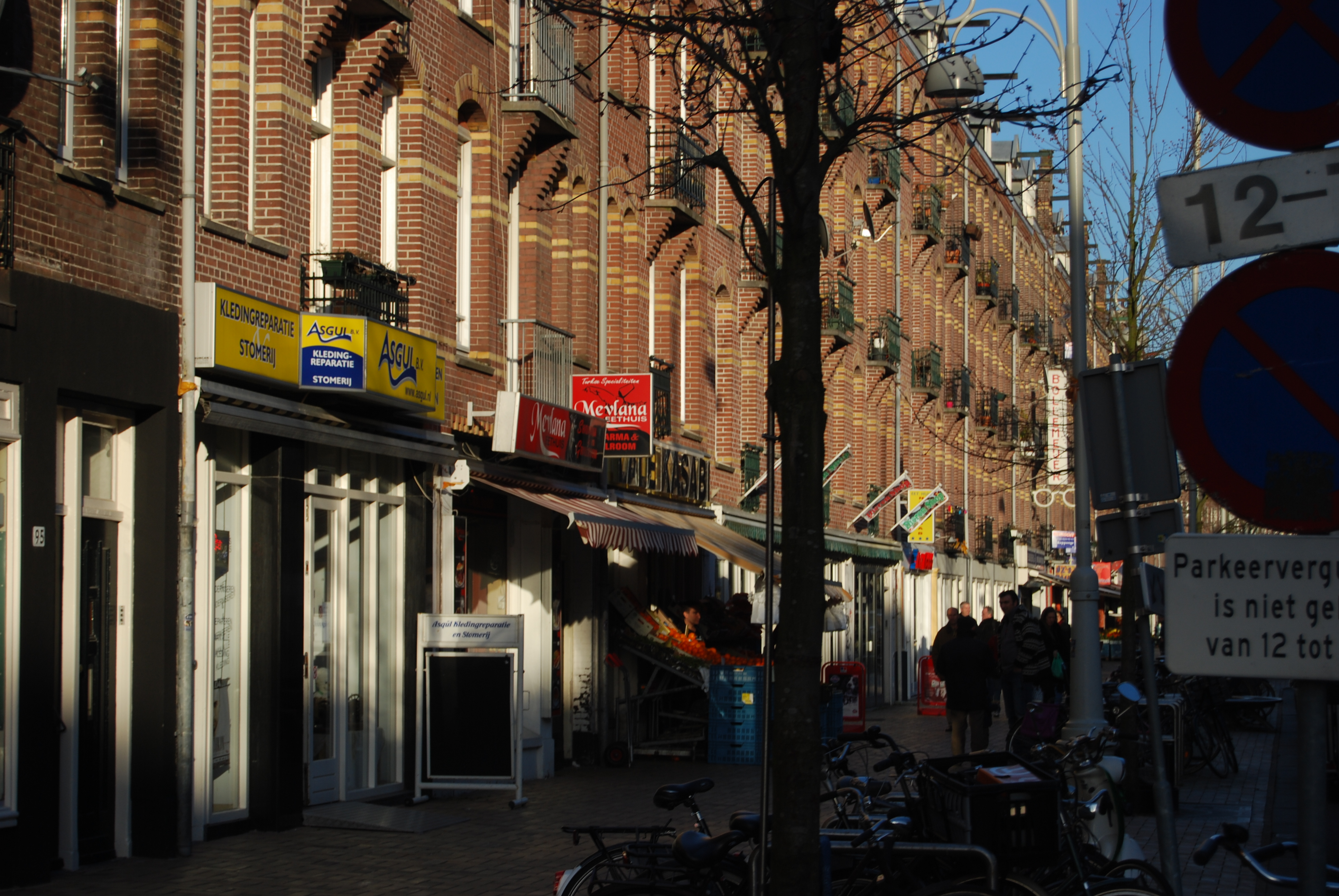
Javastraat, Indische Buurt

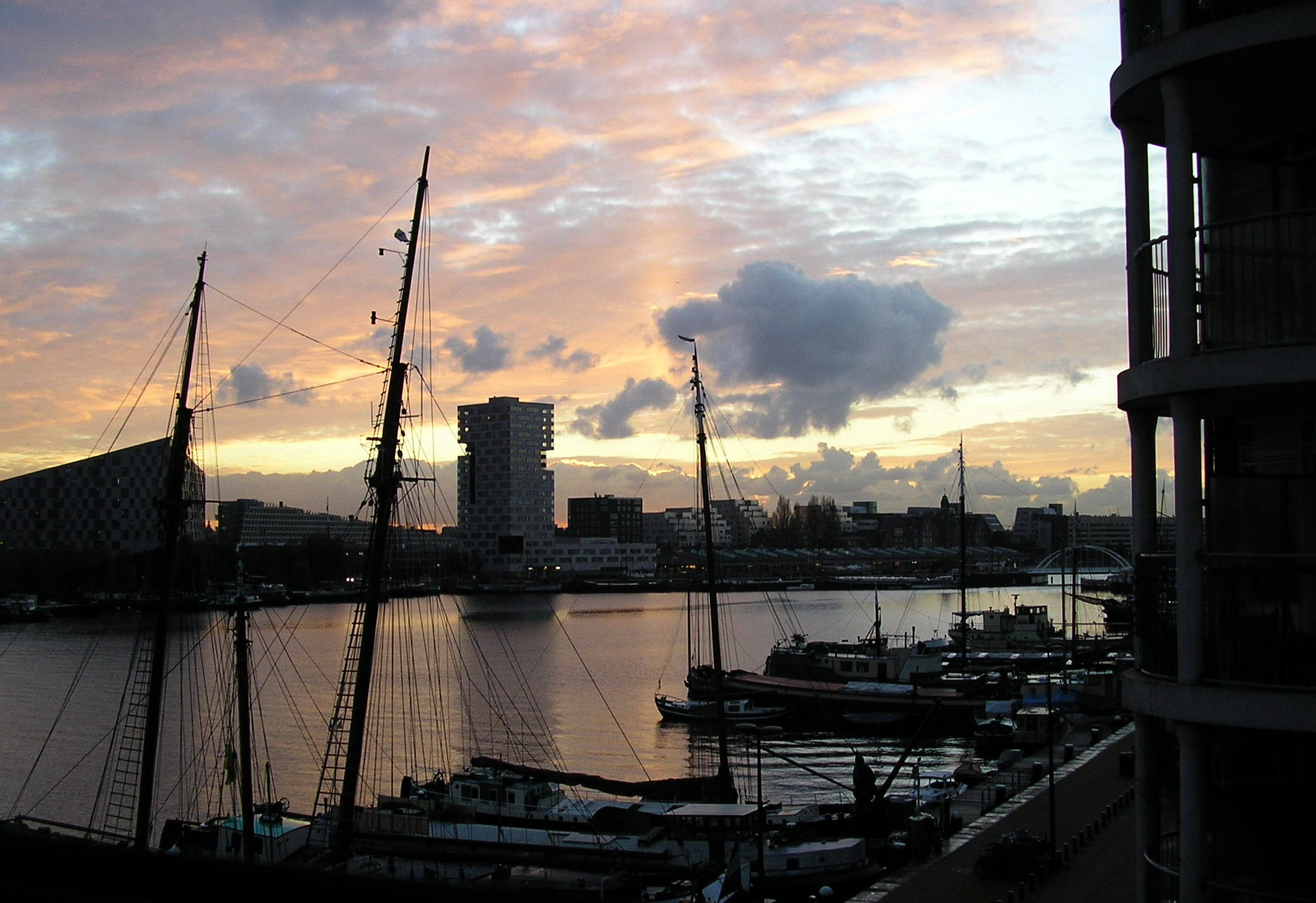
View on KNSM-eiland, Oostelijk Havengebied

Amsterdam-Oost is the borough of Amsterdam on the eastern side of the Singelgracht canal. The borough is bordered by the Amstel river in the west, the Weespertrekvaart canal in the south, and the IJ lake in the east and north.

The eastern city expansion beyond the 17th-century Amsterdam canal belt began in the last quarter of the 19th century with the development of the Oosterparkbuurt and Dapperbuurt. These neighborhoods, including the Weesperzijde area along the Amstel river, are called Oud-Oost ('Old East').

In the early 20th century, additional urban expansions were planned toward the east. Between 1920 and 1940, the Indische Buurt and Transvaalbuurt neighborhoods were constructed, partly on the territory of the former municipality of Nieuwer-Amstel. To improve the accessibility of these new neighborhoods, a railway project known as Spoorwegwerken Oost ('Eastern Railway Works') was carried out between 1932 and 1942 in which the old ground-level railroads were elevated on embankments and viaducts. In addition, the former Weesperpoortstation (1843) was closed on October 15, 1939, to be replaced by the Amsterdam Amstel railway station. The railway works also allowed for the extension of several tram routes.

From 1939 to 1942, further urban expansion projects were carried out in the former municipality of Watergraafsmeer, which was annexed by the city of Amsterdam in 1921.

In the 1990s, the new neighborhoods were added in the Oostelijk Havengebied ('Eastern Docklands') area. Since 2002, the new neighborhood of IJburg, initially also called Nieuw-Oost ('New East') is under construction. The Zeeburgereiland is also to be developed for residential purposes.

In March 2007, the Transvaalbuurt and parts of the Indische Buurt were marked aandachtswijk (disadvantaged neighborhood) by minister for housing Ella Vogelaar which made national urban renewal funds and programmes available to the area.

In 2007, construction of the Oostpoort shopping centre and residential area on the site of the former Oostergasfabriek began, which has also become home of the Stadsdeelkantoor(borough or 'district' office) and several educational institutions.

== Borough government ==
Until 2014, the Amsterdam boroughs, called stadsdelen or 'districts', were governed by a directly elected district council (deelraad) as well as a separate district executive board, the members of which were appointed and controlled by the council. Since the 2014 municipal elections, the district councils have been abolished and replaced by smaller, but still directly elected district committees (bestuurscommissies). The district committees are elected every four years, on the same day as the city's central municipal council. Each district committee elects three of its members to form an executive committee (dagelijks bestuur). The district committees' jurisdiction is determined by the central municipal council. Responsibilities delegated to the 2014-2018 district committees include parks and recreation, streets and squares, refuse collection, permits and events, preparation of zoning plans, passports and drivers licenses, and welfare work.

The district committee of Amsterdam-Oost consists of 15 members. The committee was elected on March 19, 2014. Five national political parties and one local party are represented on the committee. In April 2014, the committee elected its executive committee. Executive committee chair is Ivar Manuel (D66), the other members are Thijs Reuten (PvdA) and Nevin Özütok (GL).

District Committee Oost	D66	PvdA	GL	SP	VVD	MB
2014 elections	5	3	3	2	3	2

The borough office (stadsdeelkantoor or 'district office') of Amsterdam-Oost is located at Oranje-Vrijstaatplein 2 in the new Oostpoort neighborhood.

== Neighborhoods ==
The borough consists of the following neighborhoods:

- IJburg
- Indische Buurt
- Eastern Docklands (In Dutch, "Oostelijk Havengebied")
- Oud-Oost
- Watergraafsmeer
