= Oud-Oost =

Designated area of Amsterdam-Oost

Oud-Oost is an officially designated area of the borough of Amsterdam-Oost (Amsterdam East) in Amsterdam, Netherlands. It consists of the areas closer to the city center, traditionally known as Amsterdam East, before the borough was expanded.

It is made up of the smaller neighborhoods:

- Dapperbuurt
- Oosterparkbuurt
- Oostpoort
- Transvaalbuurt
- Weesperzijde
