= Thijs Reuten =

Dutch politician

Thijs Reuten MEP
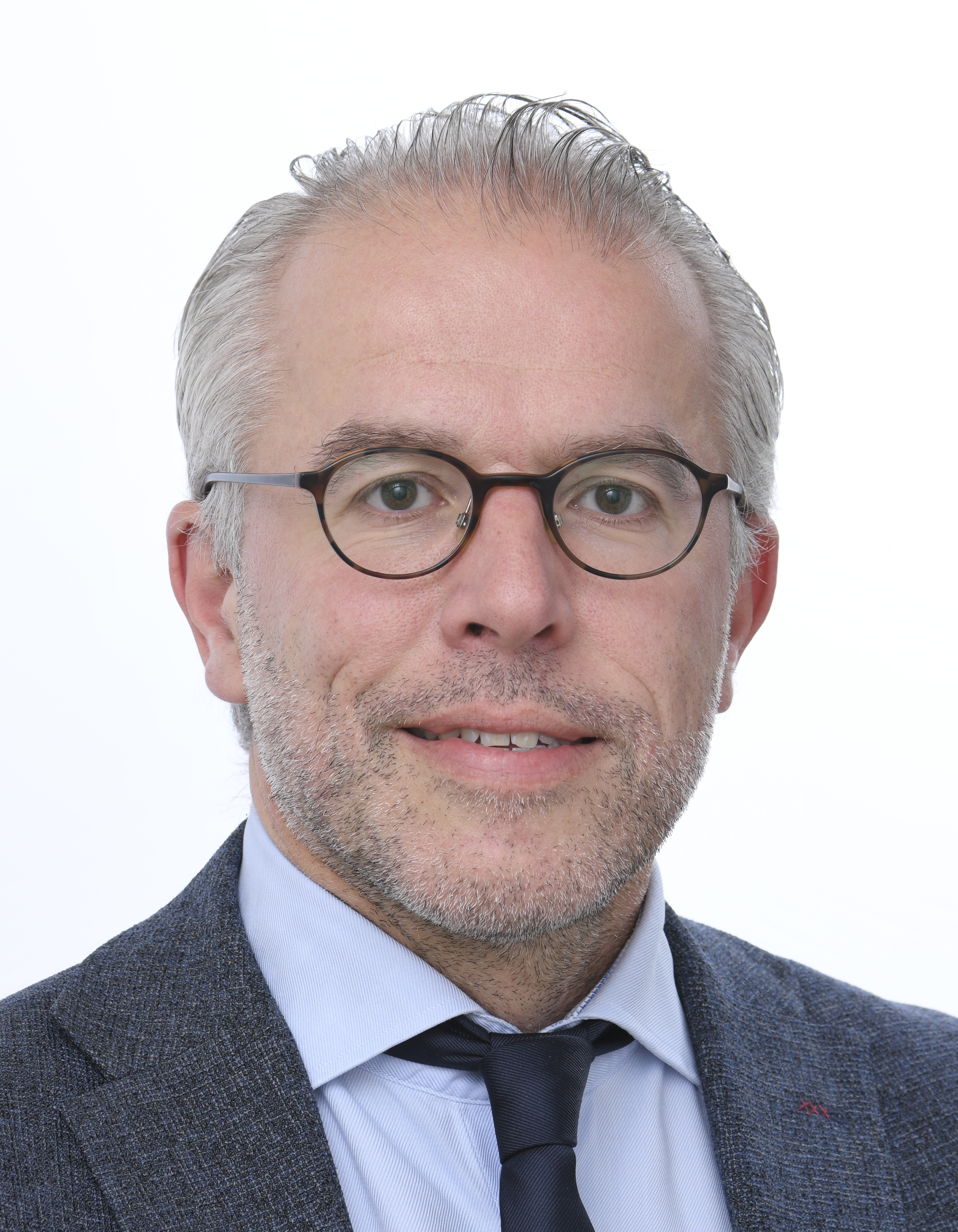
- Reuten in 2024

Member of the European Parliament for the Netherlands
- Incumbent
- Assumed office 15 April 2021
- Preceded by: Kati Piri

District alderman in Amsterdam-Oost
- In office 23 November 2010 – May 2018

Member of the Amsterdam municipal council
- In office 24 April 2002 – 3 December 2007
- Succeeded by: Ria Logtenberg

Personal details
- Born: M.J.A. Reuten; 12 January 1974 (age 52) Bussum, Netherlands
- Party: Progressive Netherlands (since 2026)
- Other political affiliations: Labour (until 2026)
- Children: 1
- Relatives: Thekla Reuten (sister); Geert Reuten (uncle)
- Education: University of Amsterdam
- Occupation: Politician; policy advisor

M.J.A. "Thijs" Reuten (Dutch pronunciation: [tɛis ˈrøːtə(n)]; born 1974) is a Dutch politician of the Labour Party (PvdA). He began his career as a policy advisor of the party's parliamentary group in the House of Representatives and was a member of the Amsterdam municipal council in the years 2002–07. He then served for two terms as a district alderman in Amsterdam-Oost with a focus on housing and the economy. Starting in 2018, Reuten worked as an independent consultant and as head of policy at the Global Reporting Initiative (GRI). He was appointed to the European Parliament in April 2021 after the resignation of Kati Piri, and he was re-elected in June 2024.

== Early life and education ==
Reuten was born in Bussum, North Holland. His father, Joost, was an Augustinian priest at the Salvatorkerk in Amsterdam-Noord until he married Reuten's mother, Simona, whose parents had immigrated to the Netherlands from Italy, in 1972. His father later worked for public broadcasting organization KRO.

Reuten studied political science at the University of Amsterdam followed by a master's in international relations in 1998. During university he worked as a subtitling technician with his father.

== Career ==
=== Early years and Amsterdam municipal council ===
He started his career as a foreign policy advisor of the Labour Party's parliamentary group in the House of Representatives, and he simultaneously served on the district council of the Amsterdam borough of Zuideramstel in the years 1998–2002.

Reuten was his party's fifteenth candidate in Amsterdam in the March 2002 municipal elections, but he did not win a seat. However, he was sworn into the municipal council in April, because several councilors left the body to serve as alderpersons in the new municipal executive. He also kept assisting the Labour Party's House group. Reuten's focus in the council was on finances and housing in the period after the national government had asked Amsterdam to construct 50,000 new housing units between 2010 and 2030. When an alderman had proposed to close sports parks and allotment gardens in order to create space for new housing projects, Reuten was a proponent of instead moving a navy complex and Food Center Amsterdam, which were located in the city. The alderman's plans were eventually abandoned. Reuten also criticized the proposal of a VVD alderman to budget €1.2 million to celebrate the 25th anniversary of Queen Beatrix's reign at a time when the municipality was trying to reduce its budget. In 2005, he and fellow councilor Bouwe Olij presented a plan to establish a municipal housing corporation that would construct affordable houses and sell them for a below market price.

Reuten was re-elected in 2006, being placed sixth on the party list. Before the election, he had to no effect supported an electoral alliance between the Labour Party and GroenLinks. In 2007, he became the political advisor of State Secretary of European Affairs Frans Timmermans at the Ministry of Foreign Affairs. This led Reuten to step down from the municipal council in December 2007. He kept working for Timmermans until the end of his term in 2010. That same year, he participated in the general election as the Labour Party's 51st candidate. However, the party's 30 seats and Reuten's 2,935 preference votes were not sufficient for a seat in the House of Representatives.

=== District alderman and GRI ===
He joined the new five-member executive committee of the borough of Amsterdam-Oost on 23 November 2010 as a district alderman specialized in housing, major projects, and spatial planning. Housing construction had slowed down in Amsterdam as a result of the Great Recession, and under Reuten's leadership about half of the newly built homes in the city were located in Oost in 2011 and 2012. He was the Labour Party's lead candidate in Oost in the 2014 municipal elections. Reuten remained part of the executive committee, which shrank to three members, after the election and became responsible for construction, housing, the economy, sports, and diversity. His second term ended in May 2018.

Reuten subsequently worked as an independent urban development consultant until he took a job at the Global Reporting Initiative (GRI), which creates standards for sustainability reporting, as head of policy in April 2020. In that position, he was responsible for enabling international organizations and national governments to adhere to the GRI's standards.

=== European Parliament ===
He again appeared on the ballot in the 2019 European Parliament election in the Netherlands as the Labour Party's eighth candidate and received 1,222 preference votes. He was not elected, as his party won six seats. Reuten was appointed to the European Parliament following the election of MEP Kati Piri to the Dutch House of Representatives in March 2021. Reuten's term began on 15 April after he had left the GRI. In the European Parliament, the Labour Party is a member of the Party of European Socialists, which is part of the Progressive Alliance of Socialists and Democrats. Reuten became the Labour Party's spokesperson for foreign affairs, justice, and freedoms, and he is on the following committees and delegations:

- Committee on Foreign Affairs (member since April 2021)
- Delegation to the EU-North Macedonia Joint Parliamentary Committee (member since April 2021)
- Delegation to the EU-UK Parliamentary Partnership Assembly (member since October 2021)
- Committee on Civil Liberties, Justice and Home Affairs (substitute member since April 2021)
- Committee of Inquiry to investigate the use of Pegasus and equivalent surveillance spyware (substitute member since March 2022)
- Delegation to the EU-Turkey Joint Parliamentary Committee (substitute member since April 2021)
- Delegation to the Euro-Latin American Parliamentary Assembly (substitute member since July 2021)
- Delegation to the EU-Serbia Stabilisation and Association Parliamentary Committee (substitute member since February 2022)

Reuten served as the rapporteur of the European Parliament in the negotiations with the European Council that led to an agreement in late 2022 to suspend visa requirements for Kosovars visiting the European Union for a maximum of 90 days. It was later approved by the parliament. Kosovo simultaneously applied for EU membership. In early 2023, Reuten was among a number of people and organizations that were sanctioned by the Iranian government for supporting and encouraging terrorism. This was in response to European sanctions against the regime following its crackdown of the Mahsa Amini protests. Reuten had proposed to designate the Islamic Revolutionary Guard Corps as a terrorist organization. The European Parliament voted in favor of a resolution co-filed by Reuten to condemn Hungary's planned presidency of the Council of the European Union for six months in 2024. Their disapproval was the result of concerns over democratic backsliding.

Reuten ran for re-election in June 2024 as the sixth candidate on the shared GroenLinks–PvdA list. The party won a plurality of eight seats, but Reuten was not elected as three candidates lower on the list met the preference vote threshold. Reuten did keep his seat in the European Parliament due to Hedy d'Ancona declining hers. He has since been spokesperson for foreign affairs, defense, security, enlargement, and constitutional affairs.

== Personal life ==
Reuten resides in Zaandam, and he has lived in Amsterdam before. He has a son, and he can play the piano. His younger sister, Thekla Reuten is an actress, while economist and Socialist Party politician Geert Reuten and actress Rosa Reuten are his uncle and cousin, respectively.

== Electoral history ==
Electoral history of Thijs Reuten
Year	Body	Party	Pos.	Votes	Result		Ref.
Year	Body	Party	Pos.	Votes	Party seats	Individual	Ref.
2024	European Parliament	GroenLinks–PvdA	6	10,135	8	Lost (Note: Reuten was not elected despite his party's result due to other candidates meeting the threshold for preference votes. However, he did become a member of the body as Hedy d'Ancona declined her seat.)	
