= Driemond =

- Village
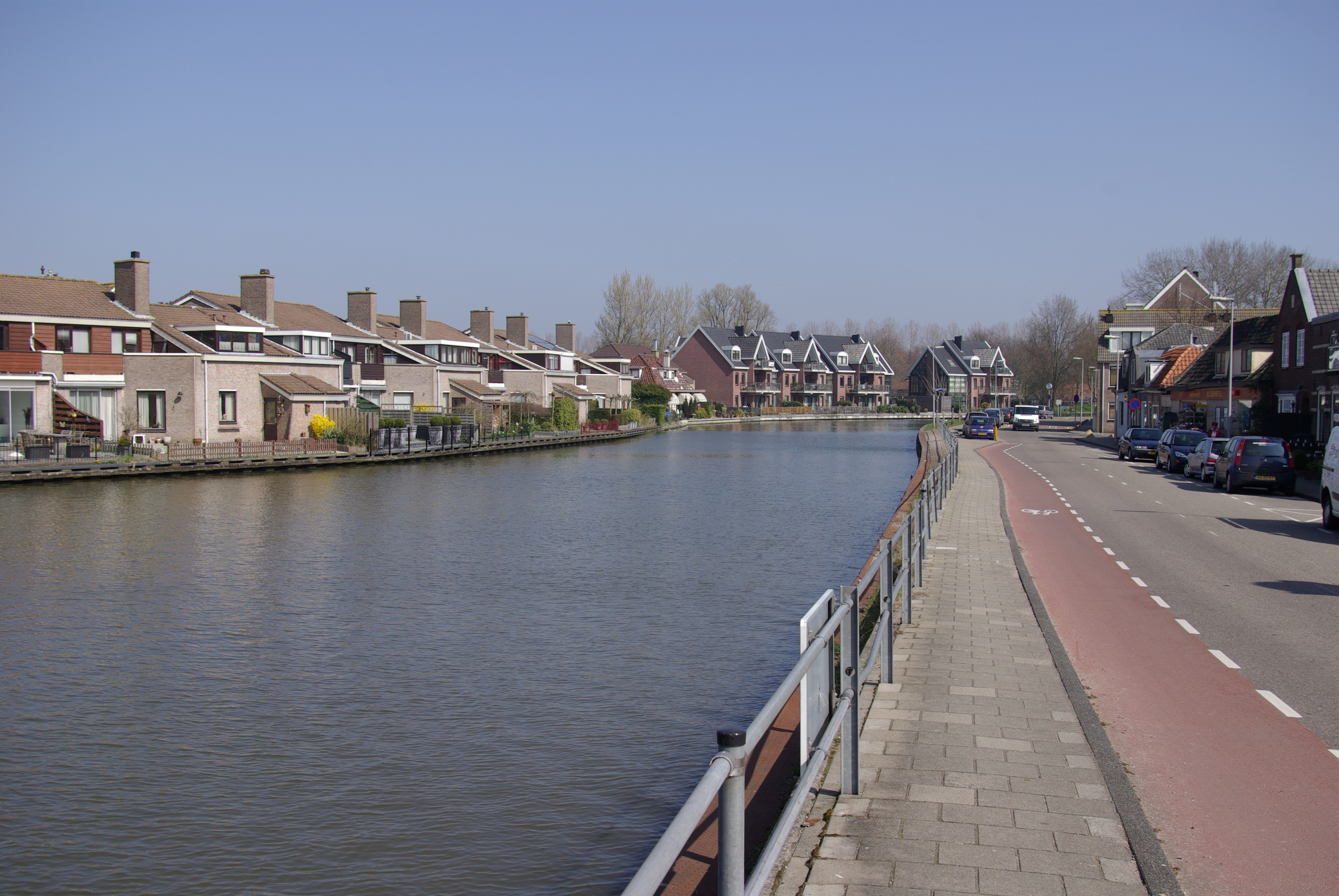
- The Gaasp seen from Zandpad near the Geinbrug

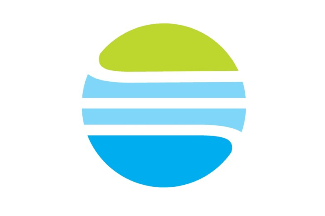
- Flag

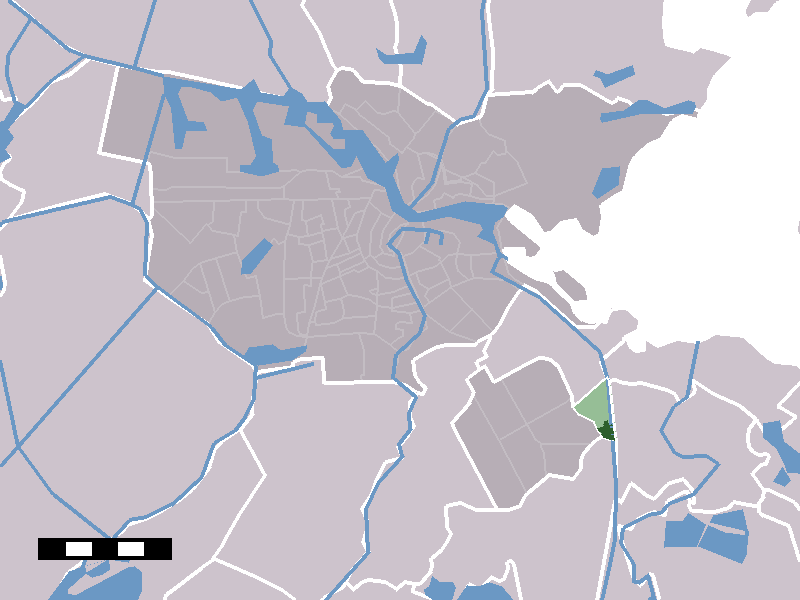
- The village centre (dark green) and the statistical district (light green) of Driemond in the municipality of Amsterdam
- Coordinates: 52°18′N 5°1′E
- Country: Netherlands
- Province: North Holland
- Municipality: Amsterdam
- Urban area: Weesp

Population
  - Total: 1,600
- Time zone: UTC+1 (CET)
  - Summer (DST): UTC+2 (CEST)
- Postal code: 1109
- Website: driemond.info

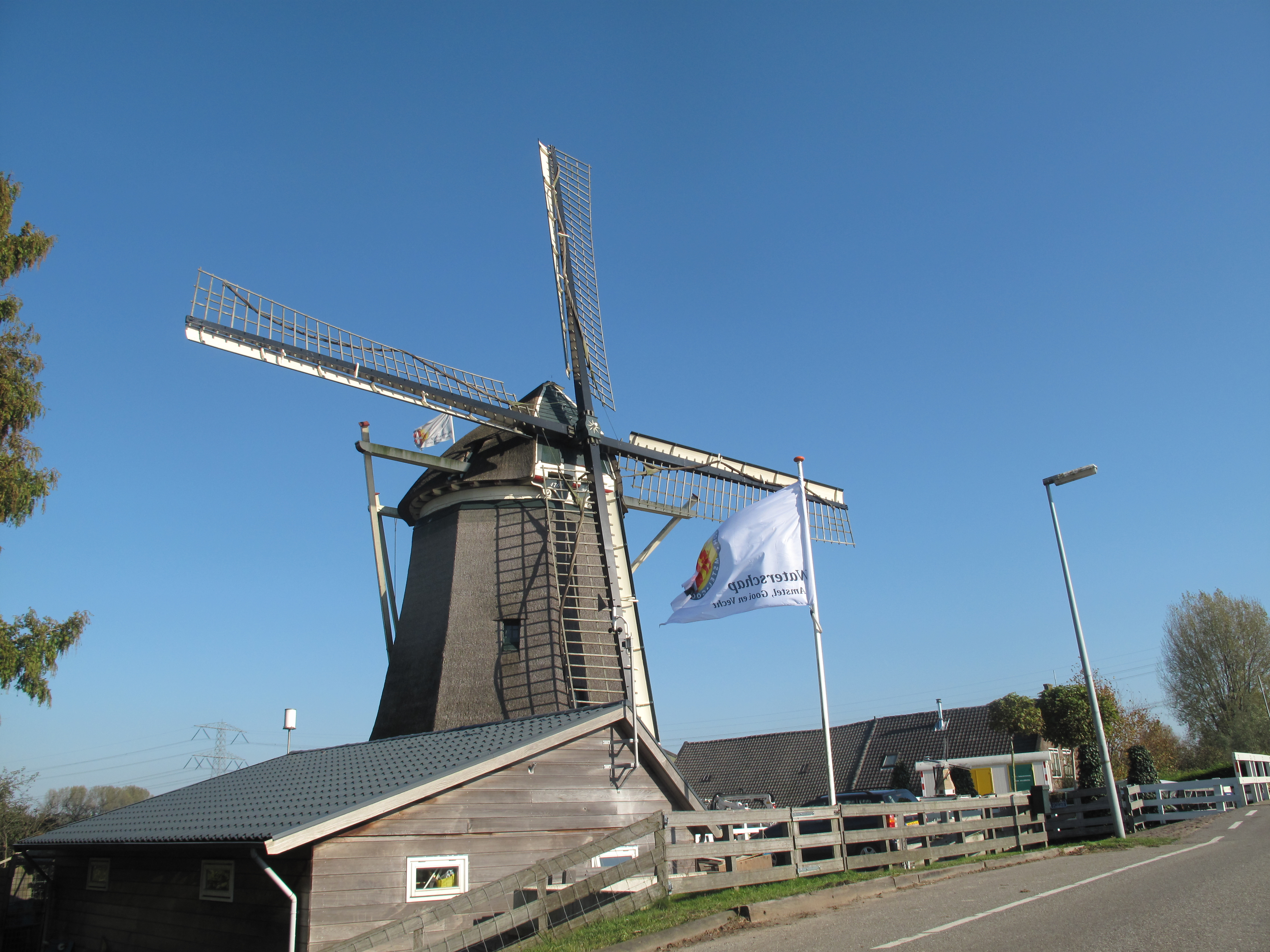
Driemond, windmill: de Gemeenschapsmolen

Driemond is a village in the Dutch province of North Holland. It is a part of Weesp, an Urban area in the municipality of Amsterdam, Netherlands.

== History ==
Before 1966 Driemond was part of the municipality of Weesperkarspel and named "De Geinbrug", due to the bridge of the same name. The name "Driemond" means "Threemouth" and comes from the three small rivers Gein, Gaasp and Smal Weesp that meet each other in the village. The name Driemond was also the name of a country estate ("buitenplaats") that once stood near the village, but except for the fountain that can be admired in Frankendael in the Watergraafsmeer in Amsterdam, nothing remains of this building.

The village contains two primary schools, kindergarten, a small post office, the football club SV Geinburgia, and Geinburgia Tenis.

In 2011 the new sports and activity centre MATCHZO was completed in Driemond. The complex comprises a sports hall of approximately 2,000 m2 with two tennis courts, a gymnasium, changing rooms, physiotherapy room, boardroom, village council office and a spacious canteen with 2 billiards and a community centre. SV Geinburgia, Driemond Fit, the billiard club, the Village Council Driemond where also a small post office is located, the Historische Kring Driemond, the Jan Woudsmaschool and the Cornelis Jetsesschool are regular users of the building.

=== Reunification with Weesp ===
As of 24 March 2022, the municipality of Weesp merged with the municipality of Amsterdam and, together with Driemond, it forms an Urban area within that municipality with its own management committee and 'separate status'.

== Demographics ==
In 2001, the village of Driemond had 1422 inhabitants. The built-up area of the village was 0.2 km^{2}, and contained 571 residences. The statistical district "Driemond", which covers the village and the surrounding countryside, has a population of around 1600 and 620 houses.

== Regions ==
Maanhof
