= Indische Buurt =

- Neighbourhood of Amsterdam
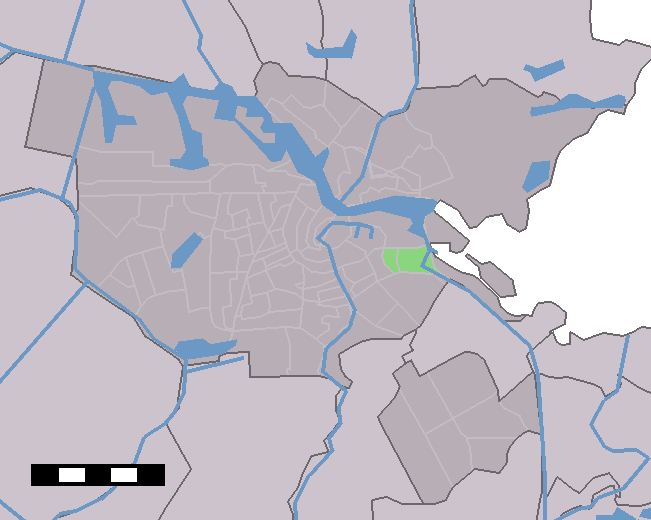
- Coordinates (Javaplein): 52°21.830′N 4°56.373′E
- Country: Netherlands
- Province: North Holland
- COROP: Amsterdam
- Borough: Amsterdam-Oost

Population
  - Total: 23,357

Indische Buurt (Dutch pronunciation: [ˌɪndisə ˈbyːrt]; "Indies Neighborhood") is a neighborhood in the borough of Oost, the eastern part of the city of Amsterdam, Netherlands. The name of the neighborhood dates from the early 20th century, and is derived from the fact that the neighborhood's streets are named after islands and other geographical concepts in the former Dutch colony of the Dutch East Indies or now known as Indonesia. The first street was named in 1902.

In 2003, the neighborhood had around 23,000 inhabitants. The neighborhood is bounded on the west by the railroad Amsterdam - Hilversum (with the Muiderpoort Station), on the east side by Flevopark, on the north side by Zeeburgerdijk and on the south side by the Ringvaart Watergraafsmeer. As of January 2023, the Indische Buurt neighborhood in Amsterdam-Oost had a population of approximately 24,000 residents. This figure reflects a steady population size compared to previous years, indicating consistent residential occupancy in the area.

Indische Buurt is the oldest part of the former Zeeburg district and is very ethnically diverse. A high percentage of the population is of immigrant origin (for Zeeburg this is already high at 55%, but higher in the Indische Buurt) and there are an estimated 100 languages spoken.

== History ==
The impetus was given to create a new residential area in the early 20th century, as Amsterdam had previously experienced large population growth. The construction of the area was well under way on the wave of economic growth that followed the completion of the North Sea Canal in 1876. In May 1915, the tram route 14 was extended into Indische Buurt.

The growth continued for some time, with an interruption in the 1930s as a result of the Great Depression. Indische Buurt was relatively isolated from the rest of the city by its position behind the railway line that runs through the area, and connects Amsterdam Centraal with Utrecht, until 1939 when Muiderpoort Station was built.

One of the last bath houses in Amsterdam was built on Javaplein in 1942, which functioned until 1982.

From the 1960s the Amsterdam seaport moved to the west of the city and the neighborhood became a purely residential area.

== Redevelopment ==
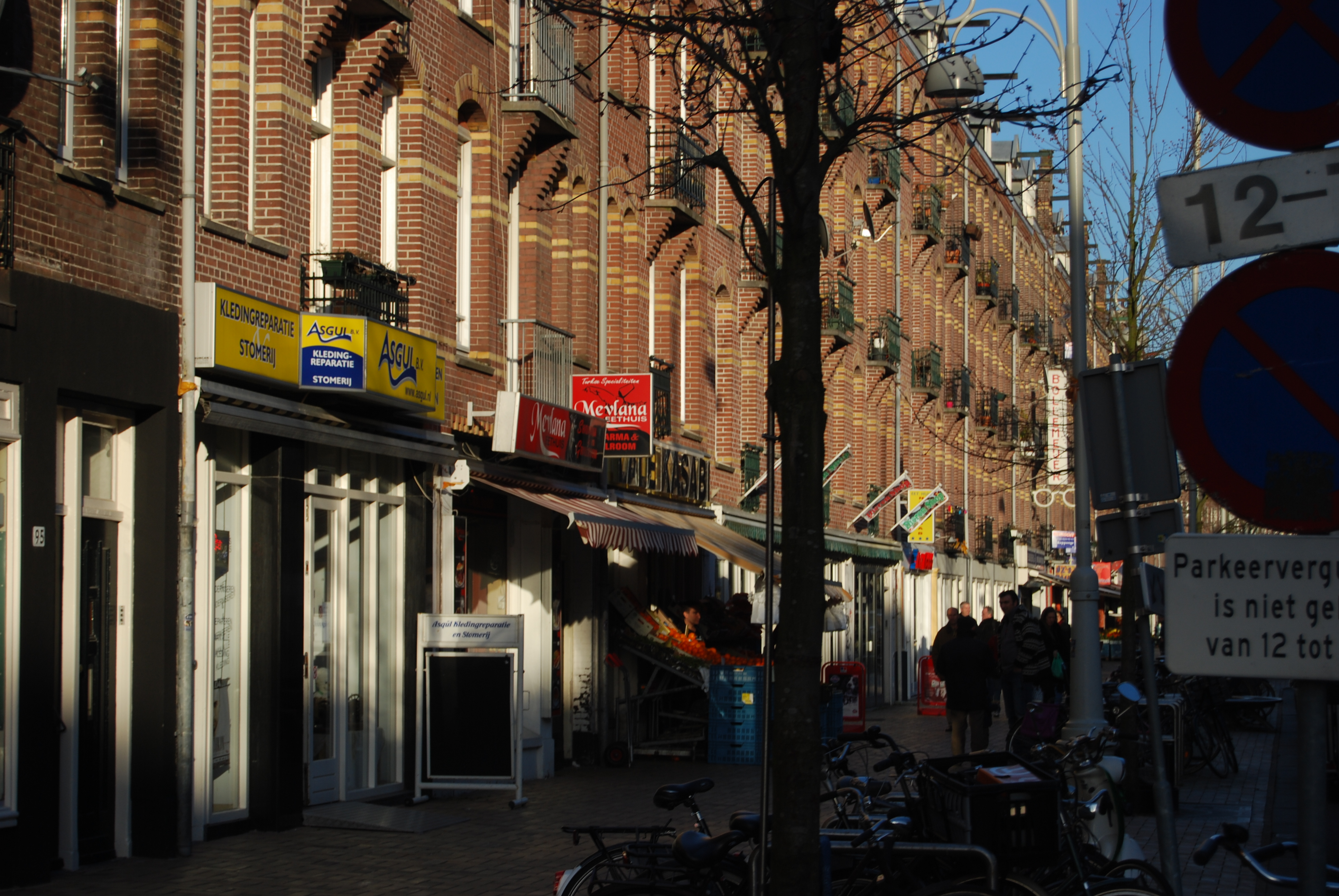
The Javastraat in the Indische Buurt

Since the mid-1990s the area has been undergoing rapid gentrification as formerly squatted buildings, as well as former student housing, are being renovated and sold. Timorplein is a particular area of focus for the area's urban gentrification, and the square's renewal was completed in 2010 with the opening of a new cultural institution which includes Studio K, housing a theater and restaurant, a new 'Stayokay' hostel, and the IIRE, which includes meeting and conference rooms. Another redevelopment project is 'Pompstation', near the Zeeburgerdijk tram stop, a restaurant and cafe located in a former industrial building.

In addition, one of the neighborhood's major thoroughfares, the Javastraat, has continued to evolve into a popular shopping and dining destination throughout the 2010s and 2020s, with a growing number of boutique stores, cafés, and international eateries. The area surrounding Javaplein has also seen new residential construction, public art installations, and landscaping improvements.

Since 2014, the nearby Flevopark has been upgraded, with renovations to its historic outdoor swimming pool, the Flevoparkbad, which features a 60-meter pool, a children's pool, and recreational facilities, making it a popular local amenity during summer months.

Major urban development projects near the Indische Buurt, such as those on Zeeburgereiland and in the Sluisbuurt area, have also influenced the physical character of the neighborhood. Zeeburgereiland has been under continuous development since the early 2010s, introducing new housing, schools, and recreational areas. The Sluisbuurt, located directly east of the Indische Buurt, is expected to deliver 5,500 homes and several high-rise towers by 2030, contributing to Amsterdam’s strategy of urban densification.

== Public transport ==
Amsterdam Muiderpoort railway station is situated in the west of Indische Buurt on the border with Watergraafsmeer. Trains to Amsterdam, Schiphol, Rotterdam, Utrecht / Rhenen and Amersfoort call at Muiderpoort.

Tram routes 7, 14 and 25 have their terminus in Indische Buurt. Route 25 has its terminus at the Muiderpoort Station, and route 7 at Flevopark. Bus route 40 has a terminus at Muiderpoort Station. In addition, bus lines 37, and 65 run through Indische Buurt.

== Areas ==
Within Indische Buurt, several smaller areas are recognized: Ambonbuurt, Makassarbuurt, Sumatrabuurt and Timorbuurt.

=== Ambonbuurt ===
Ambonbuurt (Ambon neighborhood) is a densely populated residential area bounded by the Insulindeweg, Molukkenstraat, Valentijnkade and the railway line. The neighborhood has the second highest population density of the neighborhood after the neighboring Sumatrabuurt. The population in 2010 was approximately 4,000 people in an area of 16 hectares.

=== Makassarbuurt ===
Makassarbuurt (Makassar neighborhood) is primarily a residential neighborhood which lies in between Zeeburgerdijk, Molukkenstraat, Insulindeweg and Flevopark. The area covers 115 hectares, of which more than half is park and water. The area is densely populated and has 6,618 residents as at early 2010. The neighborhood's shopping areas include Molukkenstraat and the commercial zone around Zeeburgerdijk.

==== Flevopark ====
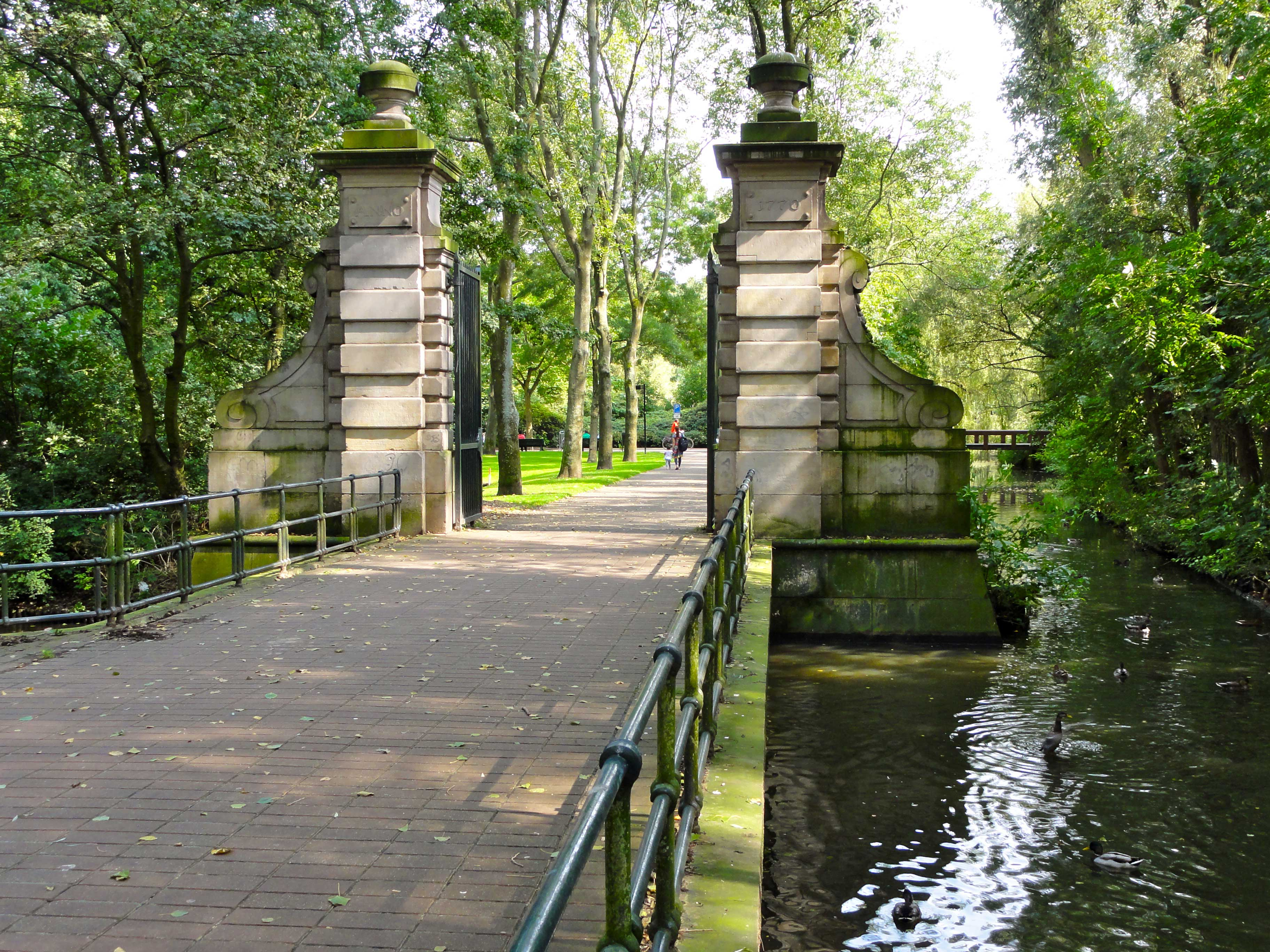
Entrance to Flevopark

On the east side of Indische Buurt is Flevopark, which includes the outdoor Flevopark swimming pools. This park was planned in 1908 by naturalist Jac. P. Thijsse, who envisioned a park between the Jewish Cemetery and the Nieuwe Diep. The expropriation procedure began in 1914, and from 1921 there was money available to obtain the land suitable for building the park. In 1928, the construction of the park began.

Flevopark includes the site of a Jewish cemetery. It was in use since 1714 by the Jewish Community, and there are an estimated 200,000 people buried there. It has not been in active use anymore since 1942.

=== Sumatrabuurt ===
Sumatrabuurt (The Sumatra Area) lies between Insulindeweg, Molukkenstraat and Valentijnkade. It is the most densely populated of all neighborhoods in the borough of Amsterdam-Oost. In 2010, about 3,000 people lived on an area of 14 hectares. A commercial area lies on the west side along Molukkenstraat.

=== Timorbuurt ===
Timorbuurt lies between Zeeburgerdijk, Molukkenstraat, Insulindeweg and Celebesstraat. It is densely populated: the population in 2010 was approximately 8,000, giving a population density of 14,837 per km². There are no parks in the area. The area contains the Timorplein, a cultural spot. Mostly a residential neighborhood, it contains the Javastraat, the Indische Buurt's most important shopping street.
