= Nevin Özütok =

Dutch politician (born 1960)

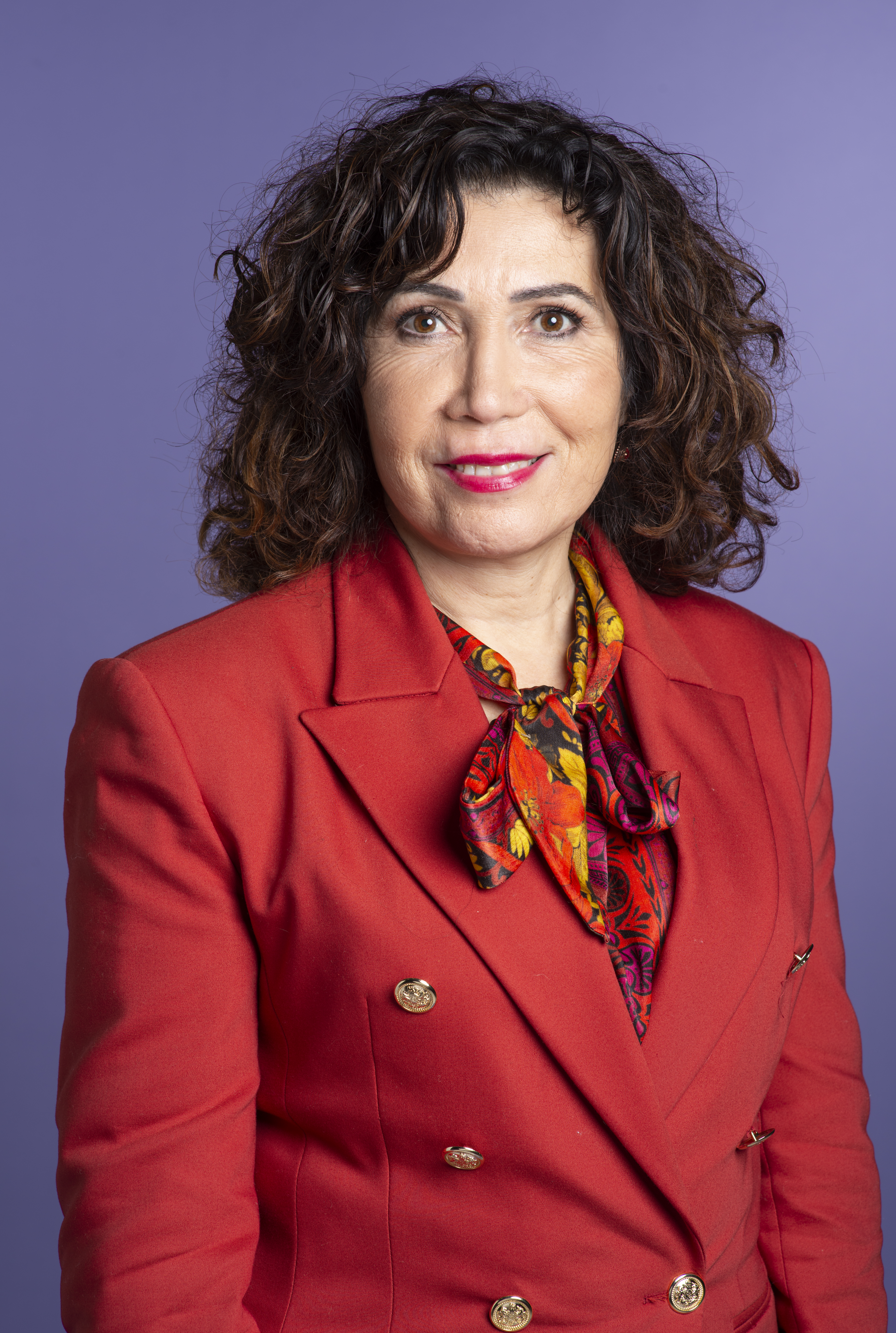
- Özütok in 2020

Alderwoman of Beverwijk
- Incumbent
- Assumed office 26 April 2024
- Preceded by: Cecilia van Weel
- In office 9 September 2021 – 16 June 2022

Member of the House of Representatives
- In office 23 March 2017 – 30 March 2021
- In office 30 May 2006 – 29 November 2006

Member of the Amsterdam Municipal Council
- In office 14 April 1998 – 31 October 2003

Personal details
- Born: 20 March 1960 (age 66) Adana, Turkey
- Party: GroenLinks
- Other political affiliations: Labour (since 2023)

Nevin Özütok (Dutch: [ˈnevin ˈœzytɔk]; born 20 March 1960) is a Turkish-born Dutch politician of the green party GroenLinks (GL). Born in Adana, she moved to Amsterdam at the age of 12. She was a leader of the Allied Union, and she sat on the Amsterdam Municipal Council for five years. She was a member of the House of Representatives between 20 May and 29 November 2006, and she served on the district executive board of Amsterdam-Oost between May 2014 and March 2017. Özütok returned to the House on 23 March 2017, leaving after the end of her term on 30 March 2021. She later served as alderwoman in Beverwijk.

She also joined the Labour Party (PvdA) in 2023, when the party planned to merge into GroenLinks–PvdA.
