= Dappermarkt =

Market in Amsterdam, Netherlands

Coordinates: 52°21′44″N 4°55′40″E

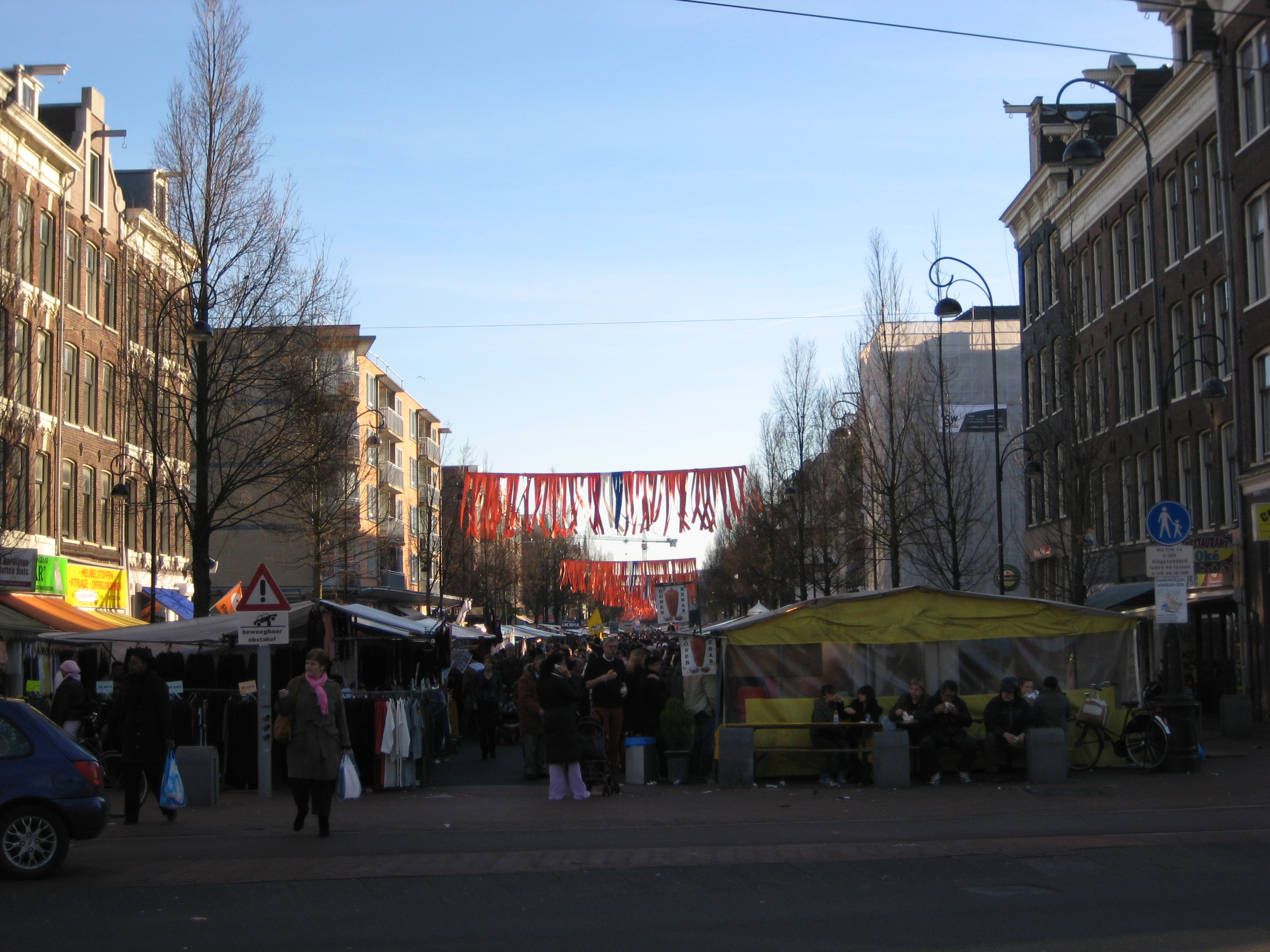
The Dappermarkt

The Dappermarkt is a market on Dapperstraat in Amsterdam-East and is one of the busiest markets of Amsterdam, The Netherlands.

In 1910, the Dapperstraat was officially designated by the municipality of Amsterdam as a market street. The Dappermarkt draws visitors from all over the Netherlands. There are many products of interest to the city's residents of Surinamese, Antillean, Turkish, and Moroccan origin, giving the market and the surrounding neighbourhood a strong multicultural feel.

National Geographic mentioned the Dappermarkt in its edition of November/December 2007. They called the Dappermarkt one of the top ten stands of shopping streets in the world.

== Opening hours ==
The Dapper Market is open 52 weeks a year, Monday through Saturday from 9 a.m. to 5 p.m. The shops in the surrounding streets are open a bit later.
