= Oost-Watergraafsmeer =

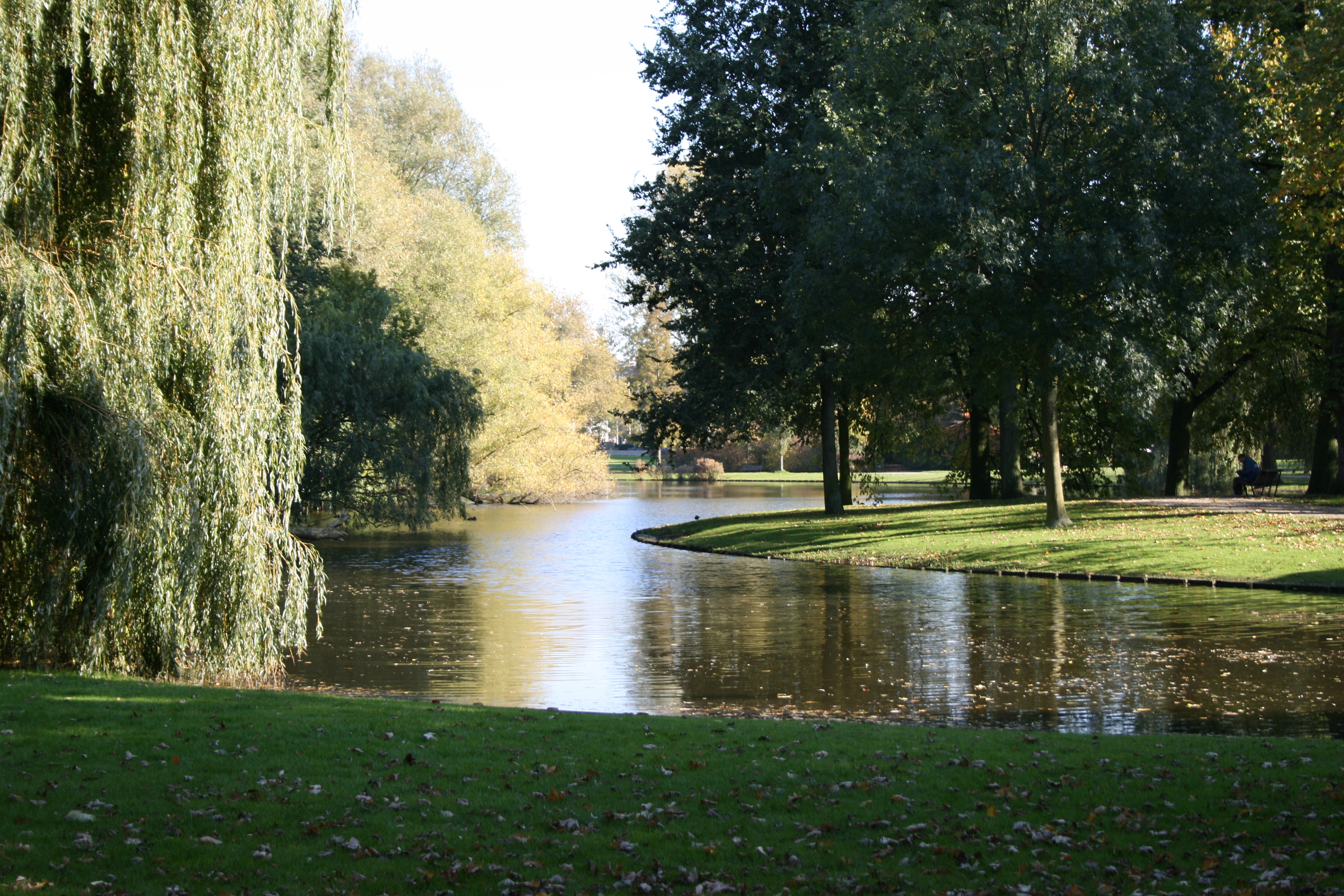
- The Oosterpark

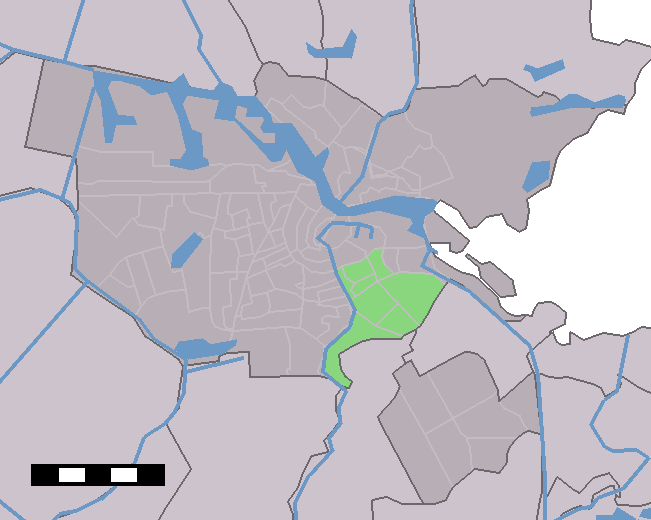
- Map of Amsterdam where Oost-Watergraafsmeer is green

- Location within Netherlands
- Coordinates: 52°20′53″N 4°55′51″E
- Country: Netherlands

Oost-Watergraafsmeer was a stadsdeel (borough) of Amsterdam until 2010. It bordered Diemen, Duivendrecht, and the boroughs Amsterdam-Centrum, Oud-Zuid, Zeeburg, and Zuideramstel. The Watergraafsmeer part of the borough is a polder.

Located in Oost/Watergraafsmeer:

- Oosterpark
- Science Park Amsterdam
- Buitenplaats Frankendael
