= Zeeburg =

Borough of Amsterdam, Netherlands

Coordinates: 52°22′N 4°58′E

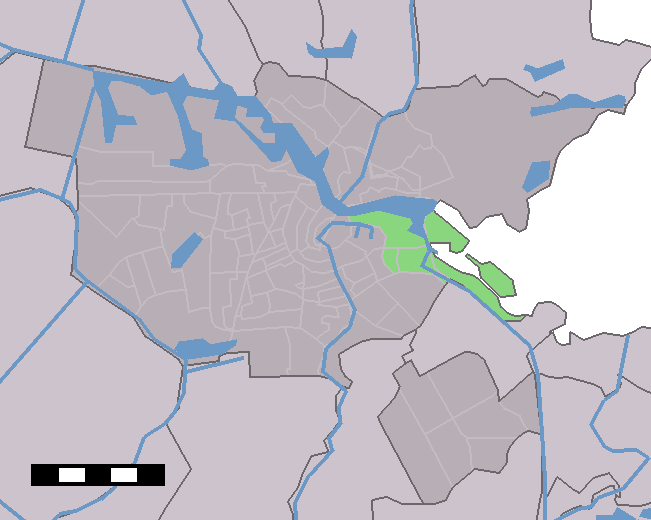
Location

Zeeburg (Dutch pronunciation: [ˈzeːbʏr(ə)x]) is a former borough of Amsterdam. It had 52,701 residents (January 2009) and an area of 19.31 km². The construction of new islands to the east called IJburg made it the most rapidly growing borough of Amsterdam. On 1 May 2010 Zeeburg merged with the borough of Amsterdam-Oost.

== History ==
The borough, which was created in 1990, got its name from the Zeeburgerdijk (Zeeburg dike) and the Zeeburgereiland (Zeeburg island) which lie in the centre of the borough. The Zeeburgerdijk is named after the fort ‘Seeburg’ which in the 17th century was part of the dike that protected land from the Zuiderzee. This dike connected Amsterdam and Muiden and was the only land route to Naarden before the Watergraafsmeer was drained. From the end of the 19th century, with the construction of the Oostelijk Havengebied (Eastern Harbour) and the residential Indische Buurt, the area has slowly become part of the city. For the 1928 Summer Olympics, its shooting range was used for the shooting part of the modern pentathlon events.

== Character ==
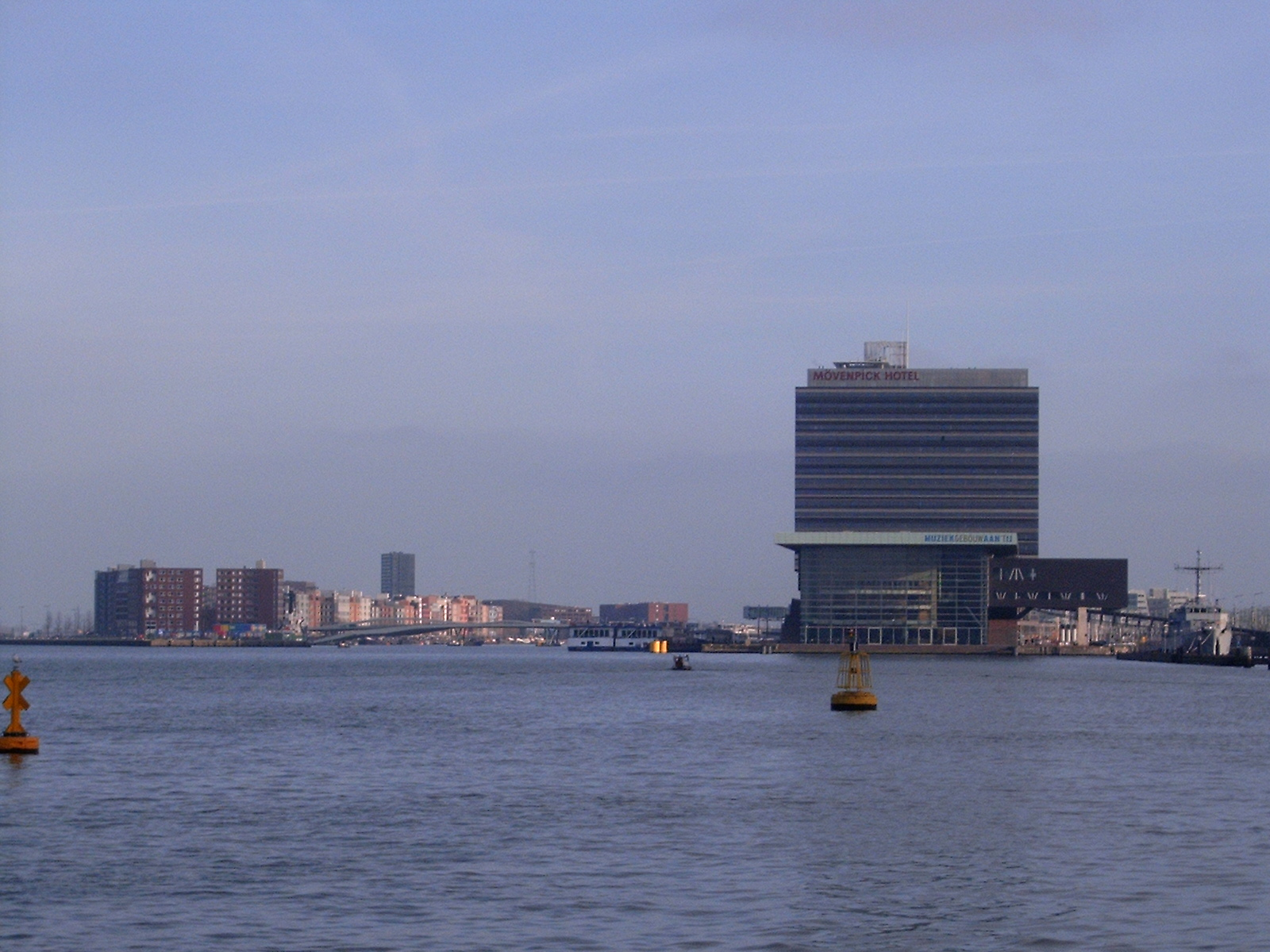
Oostenlijk Havengebied seen from Central Station

These three areas (IJburg, Oostelijk Havengebied and the Indische Buurt) have different characters. IJburg is still under construction and generally contains middle-class housing. IJburg is also far from the city center. The Oostelijk Havengebied is an upper class area and has an urban character with some of the highest densities in the country. The Indische Buurt, on the other hand, is more working-class and has a large immigrant population. Attempts are currently being made to upgrade the housing in this neighbourhood.
