= Dapperbuurt =

Coordinates: 52°21′44″N 4°55′40″E

- Neighborhood of Amsterdam
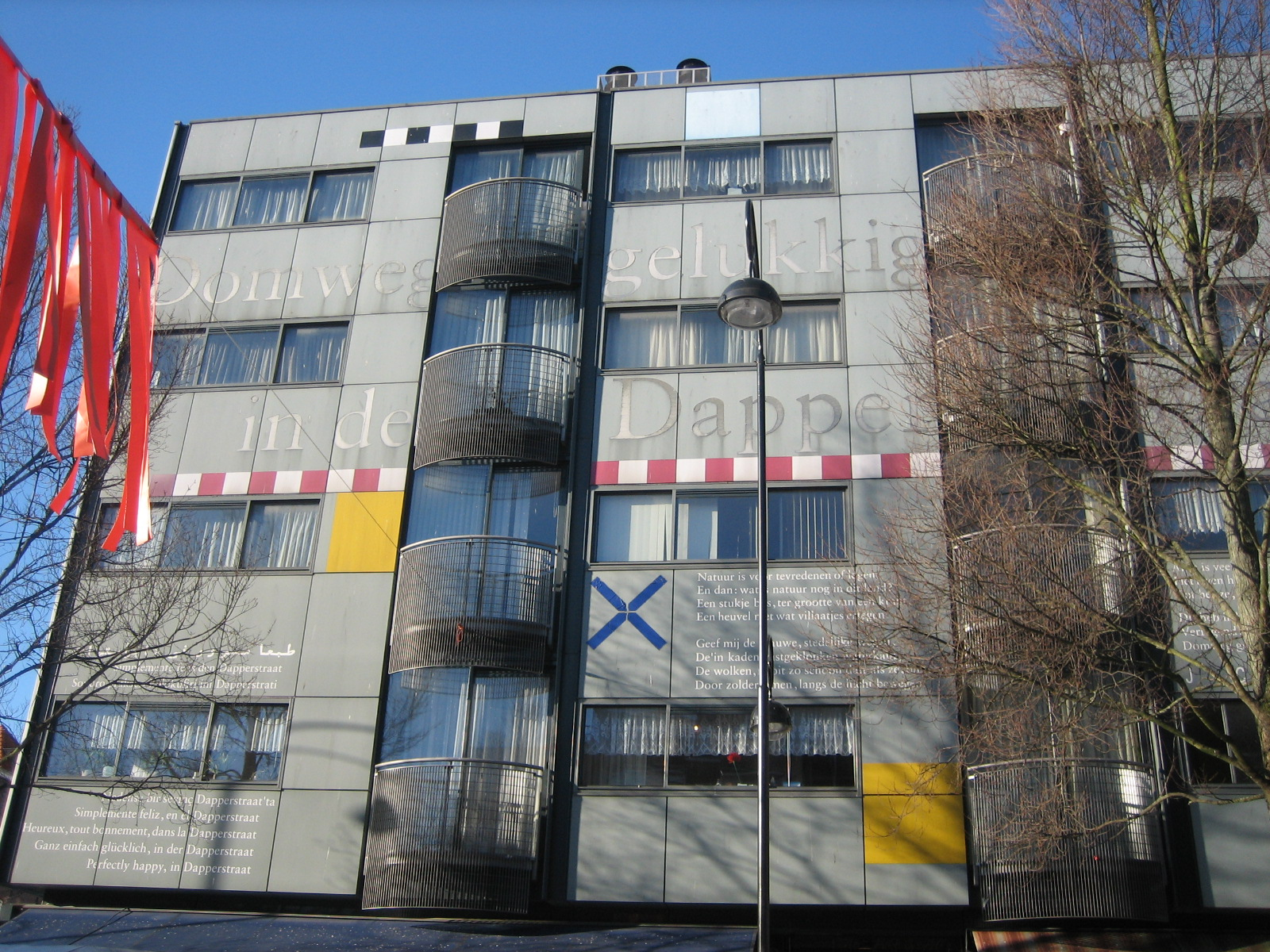
- Dapperbuurt in 2008
- Interactive map of Dapperbuurt
- Country: Netherlands
- Province: North Holland
- COROP: Amsterdam
- Time zone: UTC+1 (CET)

Dapperbuurt is a neighbourhood located in the east of Amsterdam, Netherlands. It is demarcated by the Oosterpark and Linnaeusstraat, Mauritskade, and the railway, Oosterspoor, including station Amsterdam Muiderpoort. The heart of this lively, multicultural neighbourhood is its daily market, the Dappermarkt (Monday – Saturday). There are various shops, restaurants, religious and cultural centres, schools and services, while bordering the neighbourhood is the Wereldmuseum Amsterdam.

== History ==
The Dapperbuurt was built as a working-class neighbourhood in the late 19th century, based on Amsterdam's extension plan from 1877, by city planner Jan Kalff. The neighbourhood's rectangular design is structured by two axes, the 1e Van Swindenstraat (west-east), which has developed into a shopping street, and the Dapperstraat (north-south), known for the Dappermarkt. The neighbourhood has been home to many socialist workers. A significant part of its Jewish residents were deported during WWII. In the post-war period, the living conditions in the neighbourhood deteriorated. By the end of the 1960s, an urban renewal plan was made for Dapperbuurt, but it implied that many residents had to move. An action committee was established, De Sterke Arm (The Strong Arm), which requested that residents could return to the neighbourhood once the new houses had been built, and that rents would be affordable. As such, the Dapperbuurt set an example for the renewal of other neighbourhoods in Amsterdam and other Dutch cities, largely helped by the film De Dapperbuurt (Amsterdams Stadsjournaal, 1975).
