= Oostpoort =

- Neighborhood
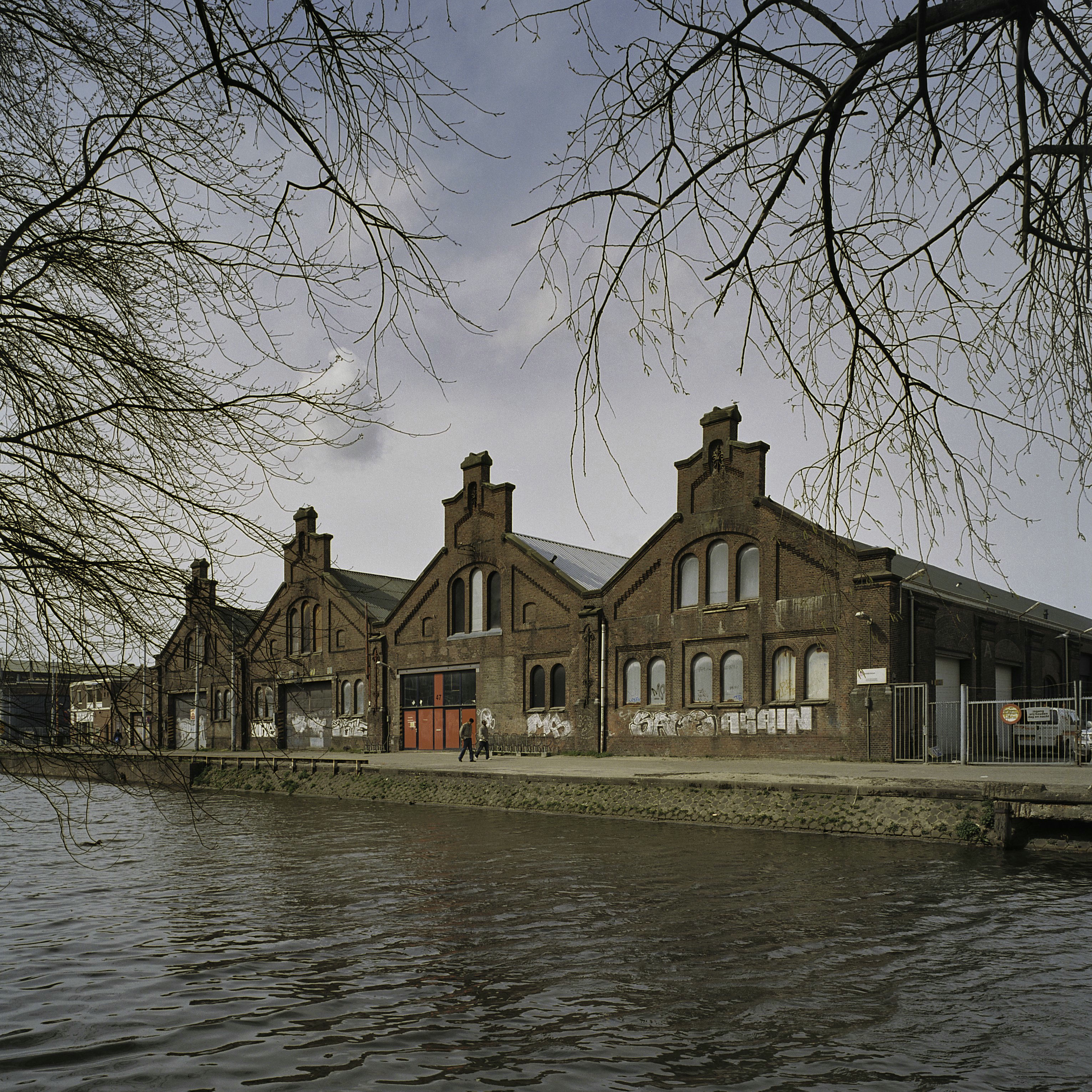
- Buildings of the former gas factory in 2005
- Interactive map of Oostpoort
- Coordinates: 52°21′28″N 4°55′53″E
- Country: Netherlands
- Province: North Holland
- Municipality: Amsterdam
- Borough: Amsterdam-Oost

Population (2013)
  - Total: 573
- Time zone: UTC+1 (CET)
  - Summer (DST): UTC+2 (CEST)

Oostpoort (Dutch pronunciation: [oːstpoːrt]; English: East Gate) is a neighborhood in the borough Amsterdam-Oost in Amsterdam, Netherlands.

The neighborhood is situated at 52°21′28″N 4°55′53″E between the Linnaeusstraat, the Ringvaart, the Amsterdam–Arnhem railway, and the Amsterdam–Zutphen railway.

Initially, the area was named Polderweggebied after the Polderweg, which is a road running through it. Between 1885 and 1921, the Oostergasfabriek (Eastern Gas Factory) was located in the area. After the factory was closed, the neighborhood became a business area. In the early 2000s, multiple buildings were demolished and the terrain was remediated. In 2007, the first new buildings were constructed. In 2008, the neighborhood was renamed Oostpoort.

In 2013, Oostpoort had a population of 573. The local government is expecting the population to peak with 2,274 in the year 2020.

The district office (Dutch: stadsdeelkantoor) of Amsterdam-Oost, a shopping area, one primary school, and two secondary schools are located in Oostpoort.
