= Kati Piri =

Hungarian-born Dutch politician (born 1979)

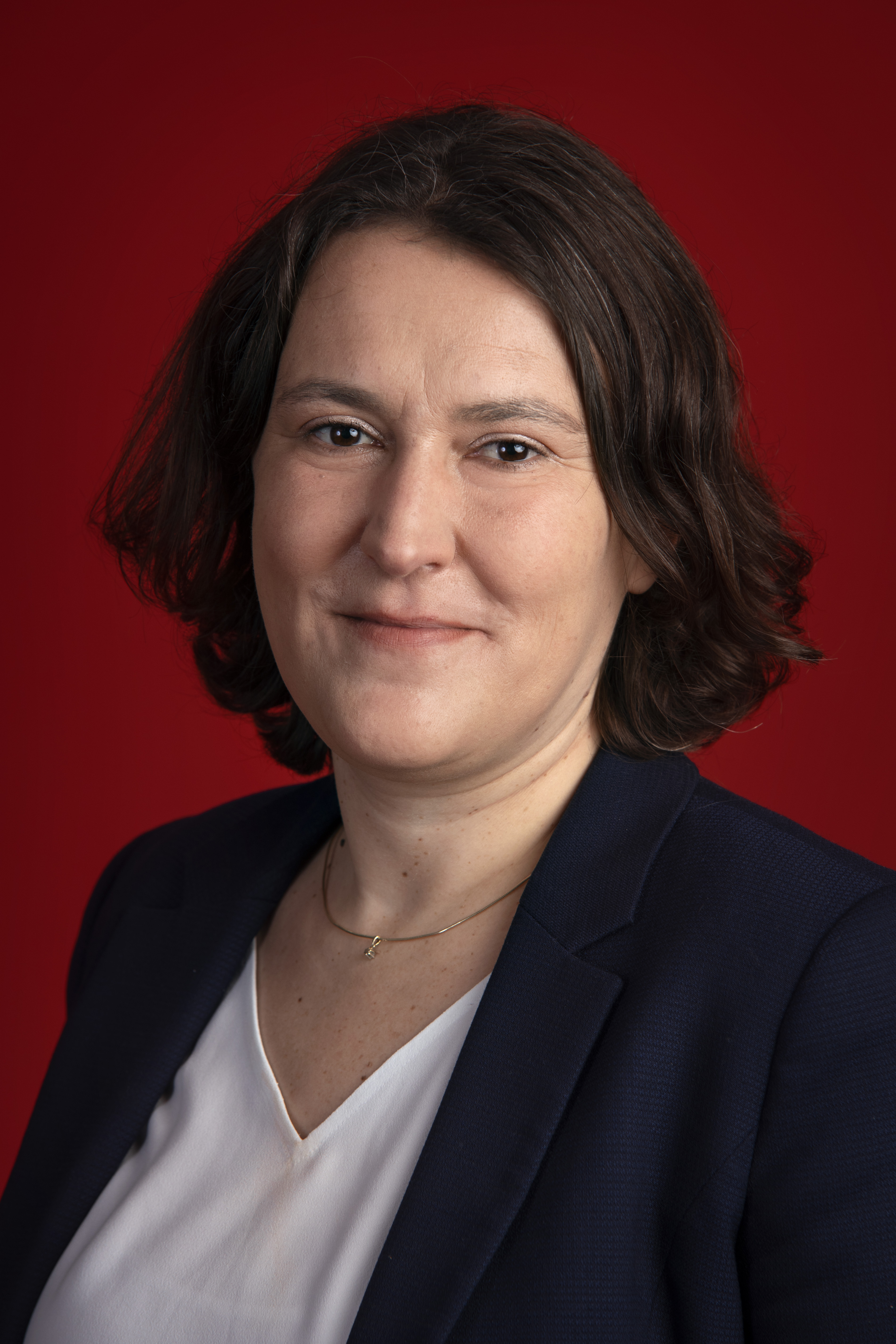
- Official portrait, 2020

Member of the House of Representatives
- Incumbent
- Assumed office 31 March 2021

Member of the European Parliament
- In office 1 July 2014 – 31 March 2021
- Constituency: Netherlands

Personal details
- Born: 8 April 1979 (age 47) Celldömölk, Hungary
- Party: Dutch: Progressive Netherlands; EU: Progressive Alliance of Socialists and Democrats
- Education: University of Groningen

Katalin Piroska "Kati" Piri (born 8 April 1979) is a Hungarian-born Dutch politician serving as a member of the House of Representatives since 2021. A member of Progressive Netherlands, she previously was a Member of the European Parliament (MEP) within the Progressive Alliance of Socialists and Democrats from 2014 until 2021.

== Career ==
Piri was born on 8 April 1979 in Celldömölk, Hungary. She attended the Christelijk Gymnasium (Christian Gymnasium, Dutch type grammar school with classical languages) in Utrecht between 1991 and 1997. Piri studied the first years of pedagogy at the University of Groningen between 1998 and 2000 and then switched to international relations, graduating in 2007. During her studies, she briefly interned with Frans Timmermans’ parliamentary office in the House of Representatives.

Piri worked as a political advisor to the Dutch Labour Party (Partij van de Arbeid) delegation in the European Parliament between 2006 and 2008. In that latter year, she became political advisor for foreign policy to the European Parliament group the Labour Party is in, the Progressive Alliance of Socialists and Democrats. She worked as an advisor to the delegation working on relations with Armenia, Azerbaijan and Georgia. In 2011 Piri worked some months at the Wiardi Beckman Stichting, a think tank linked to the Labour Party. Later that year she became programme manager for the Southern-Caucasus and Moldova at the Netherlands Institute for Multiparty Democracy.

== Political career ==
=== Member of the European Parliament, 2014–2021 ===
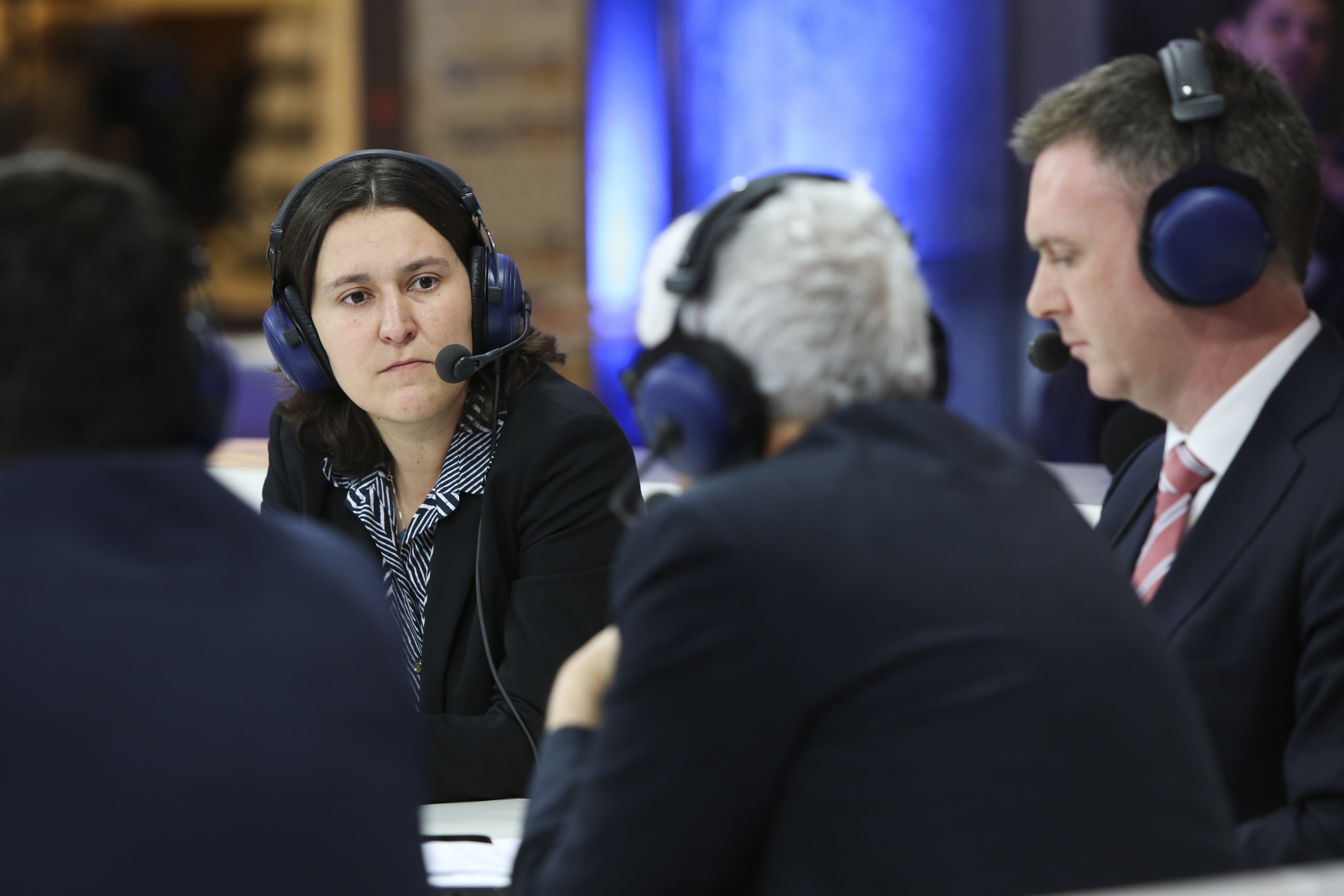
Kati Piri during a radio debate in 2014

In 2014 Piri stood as a candidate for the European Parliament. She occupied the third place on the Labour Party list for the European Parliament elections of 2014, after Paul Tang and Agnes Jongerius. She cited upholding democratic standards and the respect for human rights as internal motivations to take up the candidacy. She was elected to the European Parliament in May 2014.

In the European Parliament, Piri was a member of the Committee on Foreign Affairs. During her first term, she served as the Parliament's rapporteur on Turkey's EU membership. In 2020, she also joined the Special Committee on Foreign Interference in all Democratic Processes in the European Union.

In addition to her committee assignments, Piri was a member of the delegation to the EU–North Macedonia Joint Parliamentary Committee. From 2014 until 2019, she was part of the delegation to the EU–Ukraine Parliamentary Cooperation Committee and Delegation to the Euronest Parliamentary Assembly. She is also part of the European Parliament Intergroup on LGBT Rights.

Piri was a member of the Democracy Support and Election Coordination Group (DEG), which oversees the Parliament's election observation missions. She was part of the parliament's mission to observe Ukraine's 2014 parliamentary elections, led by Andrej Plenković. Following the 2019 elections, Piri was elected vice-chair of the S&D Group, under the leadership of chairwoman Iratxe García.

=== Member of the Dutch Parliament, 2021–present ===
Since the 2021 elections, Piri has been a member House of Representatives. She was re-elected in November 2023 on the GroenLinks–PvdA list, and she became the party's spokesperson for foreign affairs and asylum.

=== House committee assignments ===
==== 2021–2023 term ====
- Committee for Foreign Trade and Development Cooperation
- Committee for Foreign Affairs
- Committee for Defense
- Committee for European Affairs
- Committee for Justice and Security

==== 2023–present term ====
- Committee for European Affairs
- Committee for Foreign Trade and Development
- Committee for Foreign Affairs
- Contact group Germany
- Contact group United States
- Committee for Defence
- Committee for Asylum and Migration

== Other activities ==
- European Council on Foreign Relations (ECFR), Member of the Council
- Board member of the Progressive Alliance from November 2019

== Political positions ==
In July 2016, after the 2016 Turkish coup d'état attempt and subsequent purges, Piri called for firm language by the EU towards Turkey. In August 2016 Piri stated that Europe demonstrated a lack of support after the 2016 coup d'état attempt. In November 2016, Turkish authorities refused to have a meeting with Piri in her capacity as Turkey rapporteur of the European Parliament.

In November 2019 she criticised the veto by the European Council on starting the accession procedures of Albania and North Macedonia to the EU. She stated that the countries already made significant reforms and it also drove them towards cooperation with China, Turkey and Russia.

In June 2025, amid Israeli strikes on Iran and on Gaza, she advocated for a ban on Dutch export of components for the Israeli Iron Dome defence system, arguing the protection provided by this system enables Israel to act with impunity. The proposal led to shocked reactions by Foreign Minister Caspar Veldkamp and other MPs, who noted the system protects civilians.

== Electoral history ==
Electoral history of Kati Piri
Year	Body	Party	Pos.	Votes	Result		Ref.
Year	Body	Party	Pos.	Votes	Party seats	Individual	Ref.
2017	House of Representatives	Labour Party	79 (Note: Piri participated as a lijstduwer in electoral district 12 (The Hague).)	15	9	Lost	
2021	House of Representatives	Labour Party	5	6,330	9	Won	
2023	House of Representatives	GroenLinks–PvdA	4	39,245	25	Won	
2025	House of Representatives	GroenLinks–PvdA	4	43,884	20	Won	
