= Weesperzijde =

Coordinates: 52°21′12″N 4°54′34″E

- Neighbourhood of Amsterdam
- Interactive map of Weesperzijde
- Country: Netherlands
- Province: North Holland
- COROP: Amsterdam
- Time zone: UTC+1 (CET)

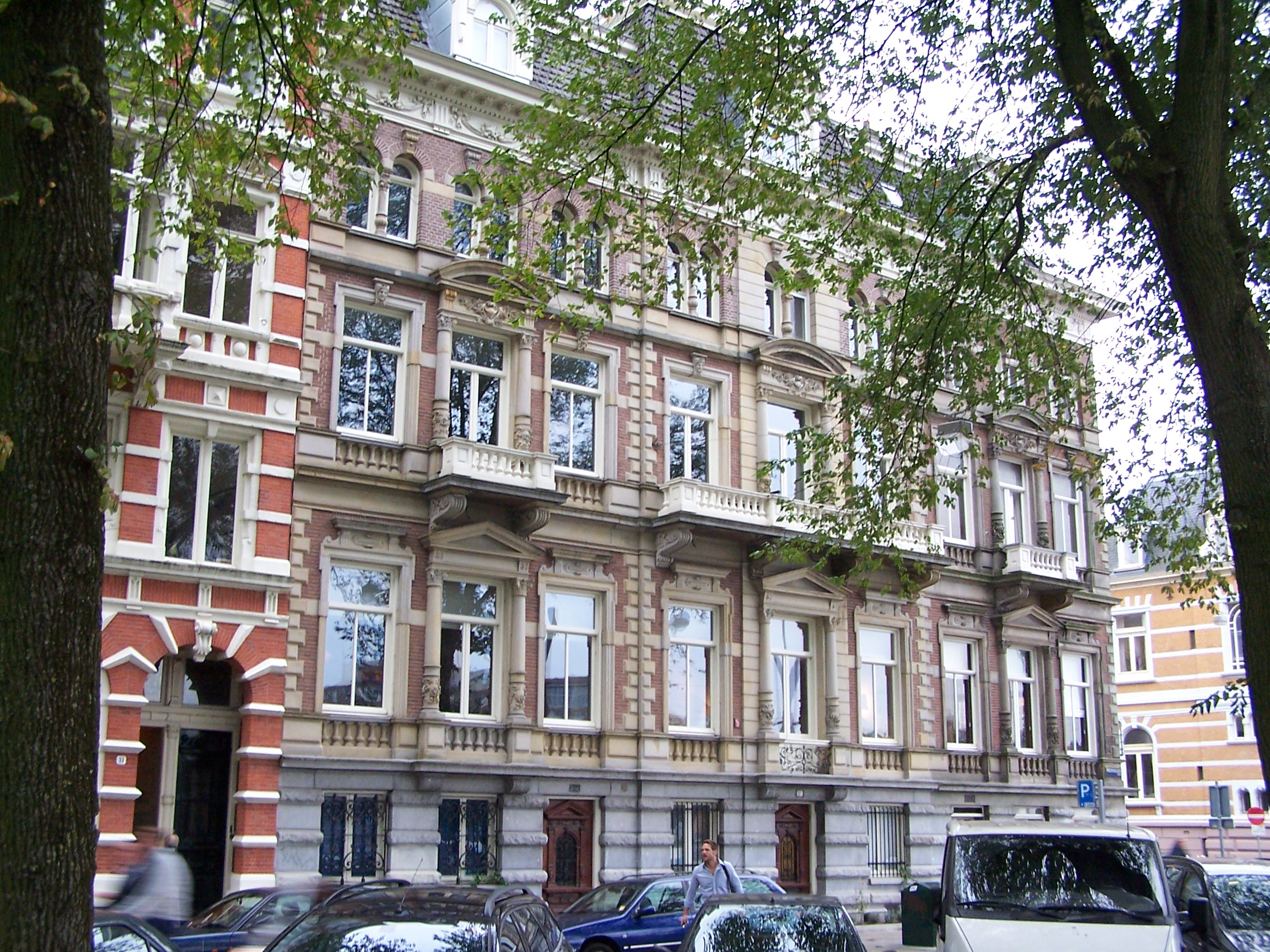
Weesperzijde: typical façade

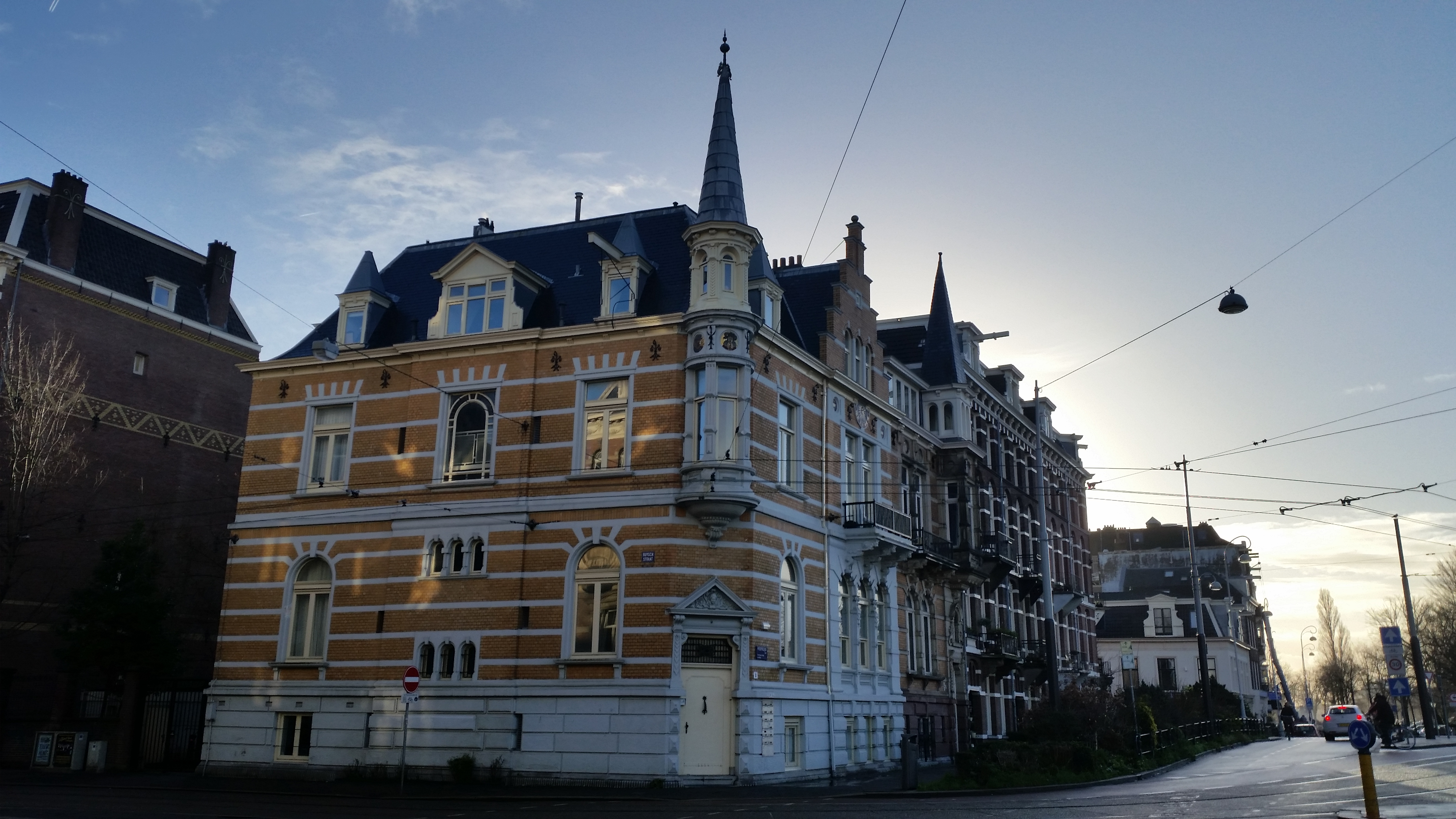
Krasnapolsky Residence at Ruyschstraat

Weesperzijde is a neighbourhood of and a street in Amsterdam, Netherlands, aligned along the east side of Amstel. It is a well-to-do residential area with a familial atmosphere, characterised by houses built during the previous turn of centuries, some by famous Dutch architects like Dolf van Gendt and Abraham Salm.
