= Oosterparkbuurt =

Coordinates: 52°21′33″N 4°55′05″E

- Neighbourhood
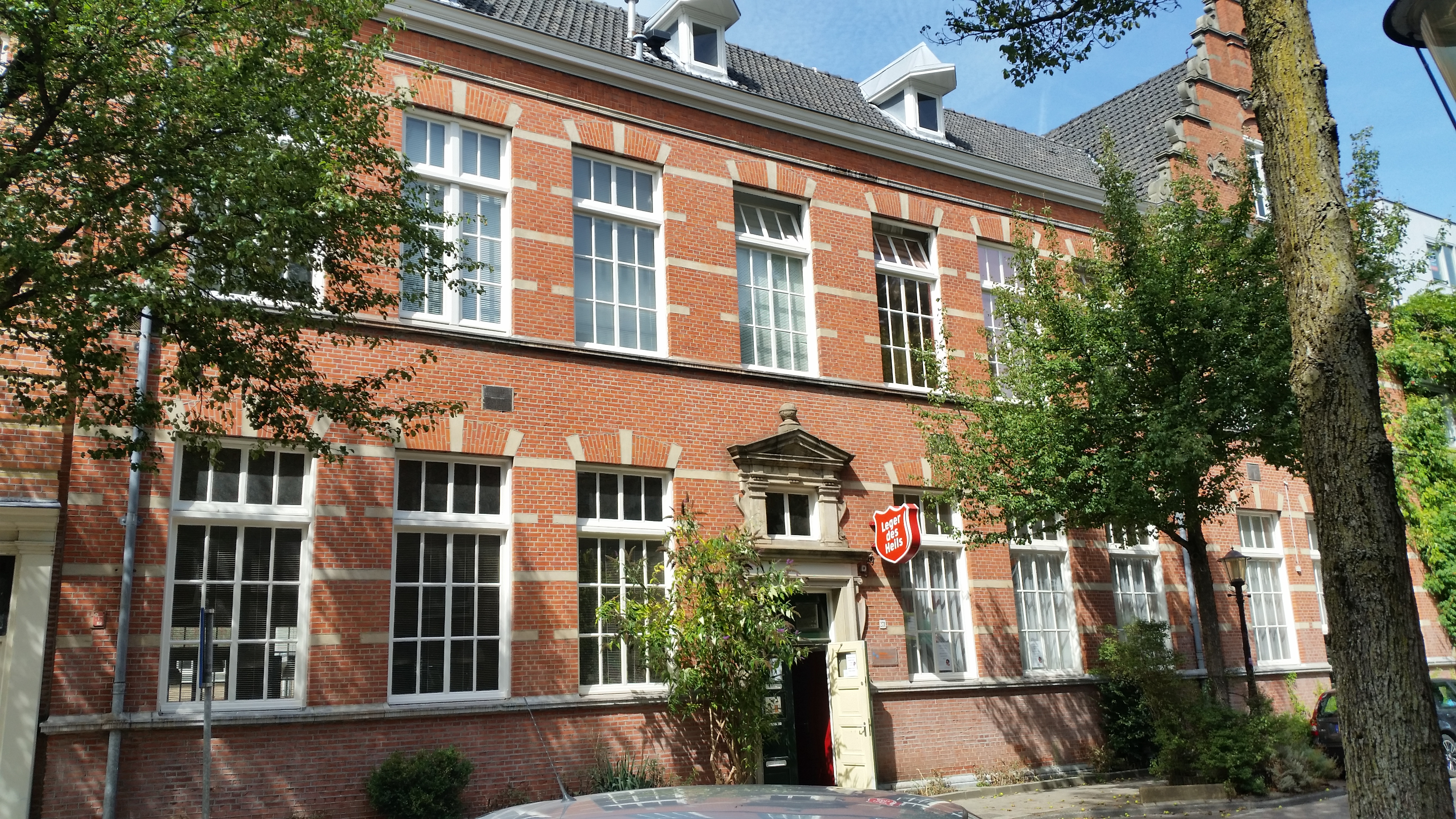
- Derde Oosterparkstraat
- Interactive map of Oosterparkbuurt
- Country: Netherlands
- Province: North Holland
- COROP: Amsterdam
- Time zone: UTC+1 (CET)

The Oosterparkbuurt (Dutch pronunciation: [ˌoːstərˈpɑr(ə)kˌbyːrt]) is a neighbourhood of Amsterdam, Netherlands. The neighbourhood derives its name from the Oosterpark. Three of its main streets (the Eerste Oosterparkstraat, Tweede Oosterparkstraat and Derde Oosterparkstraat) were also named after the park. The neighbourhood was built late in the 19th century. Until World War II, it was home to many working-class Jews. During urban renewal operations of the 1970s and 1980s, many of the original 19th-century housing was demolished and replaced.

== Landmarks ==
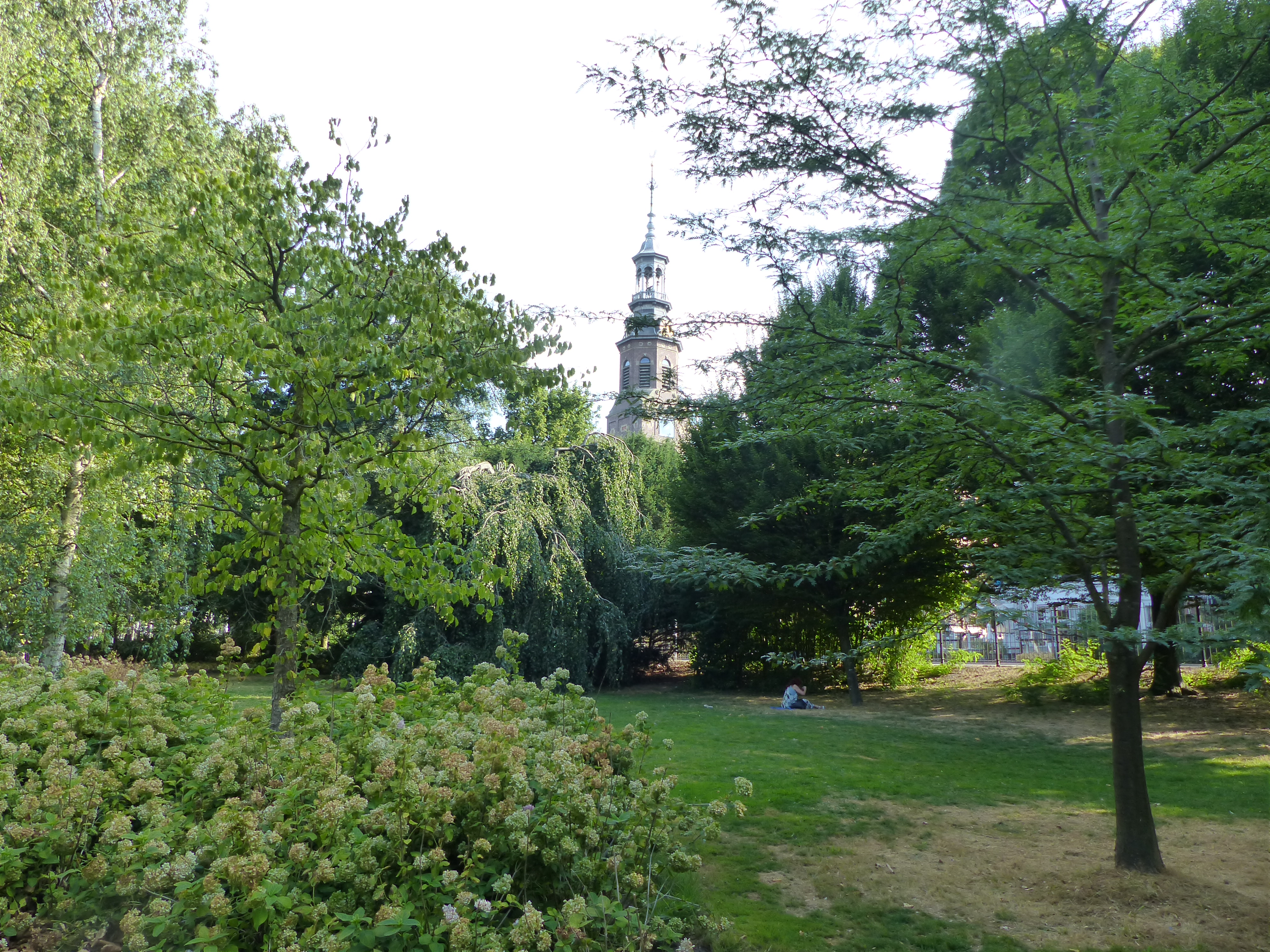
Oosterpark

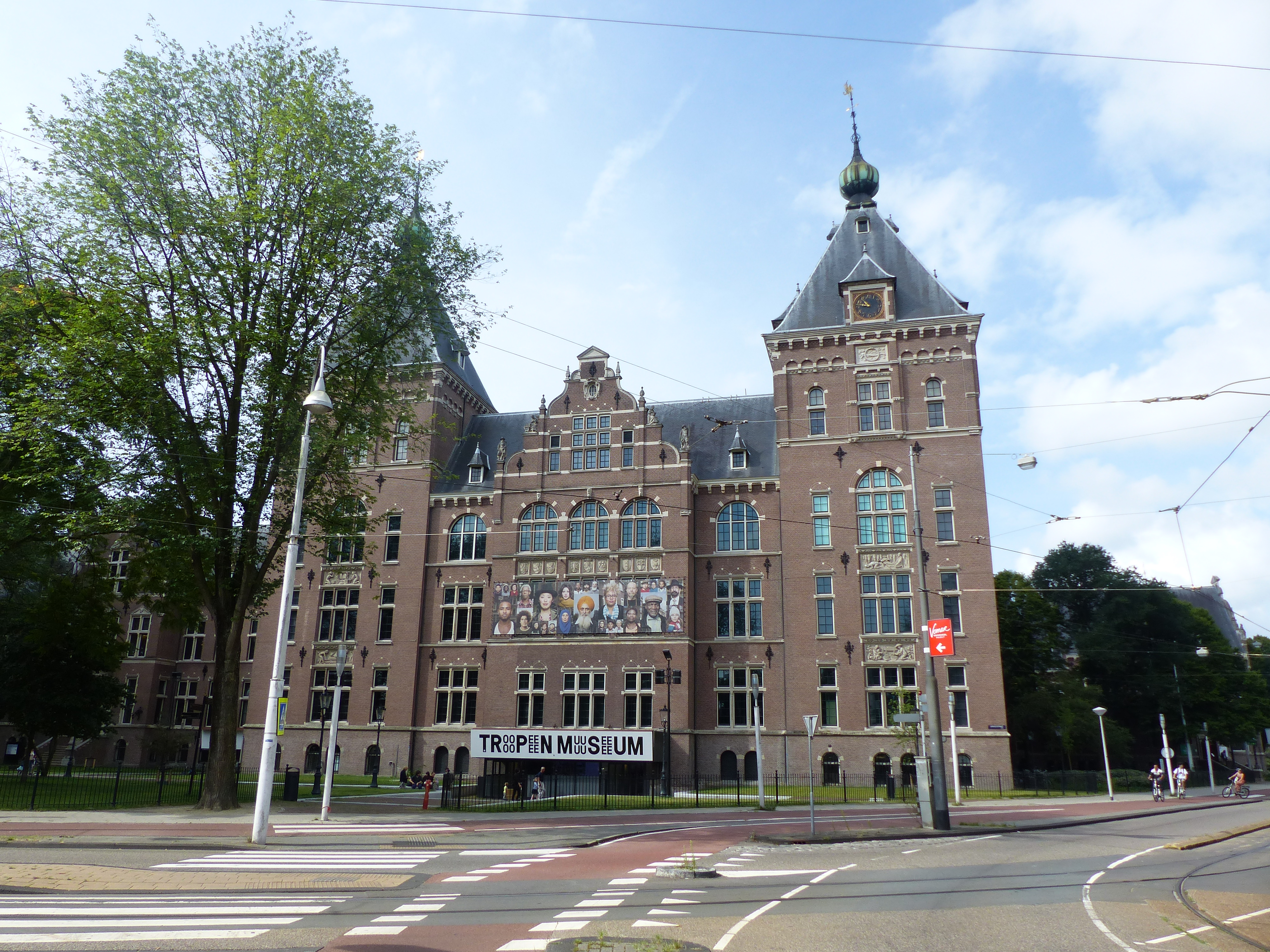
Tropenmuseum

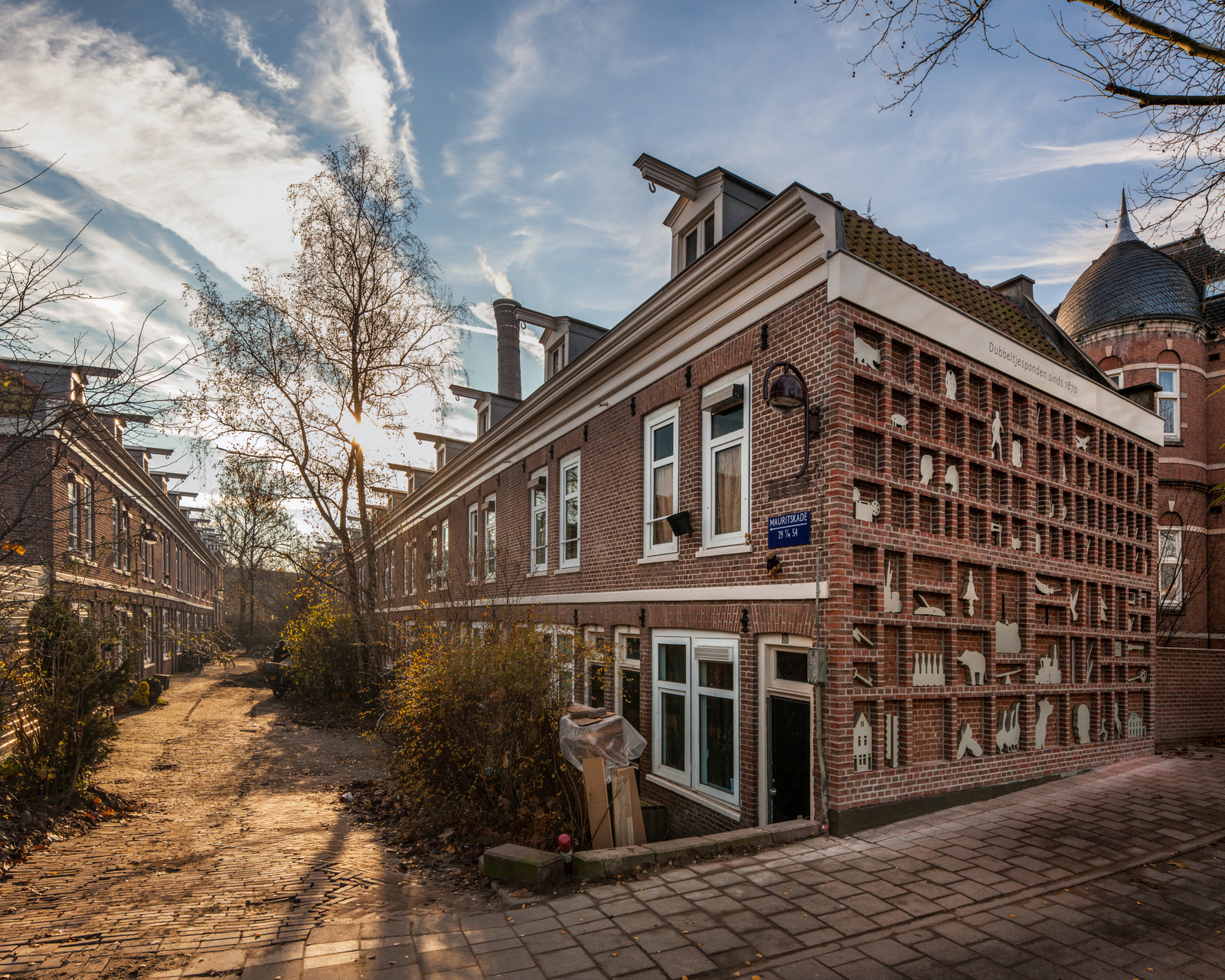
Dubbeltjespanden
