= Watergraafsmeer =

Neighbourhood of Amsterdam, Netherlands

Coordinates: 52°21′N 4°56′E

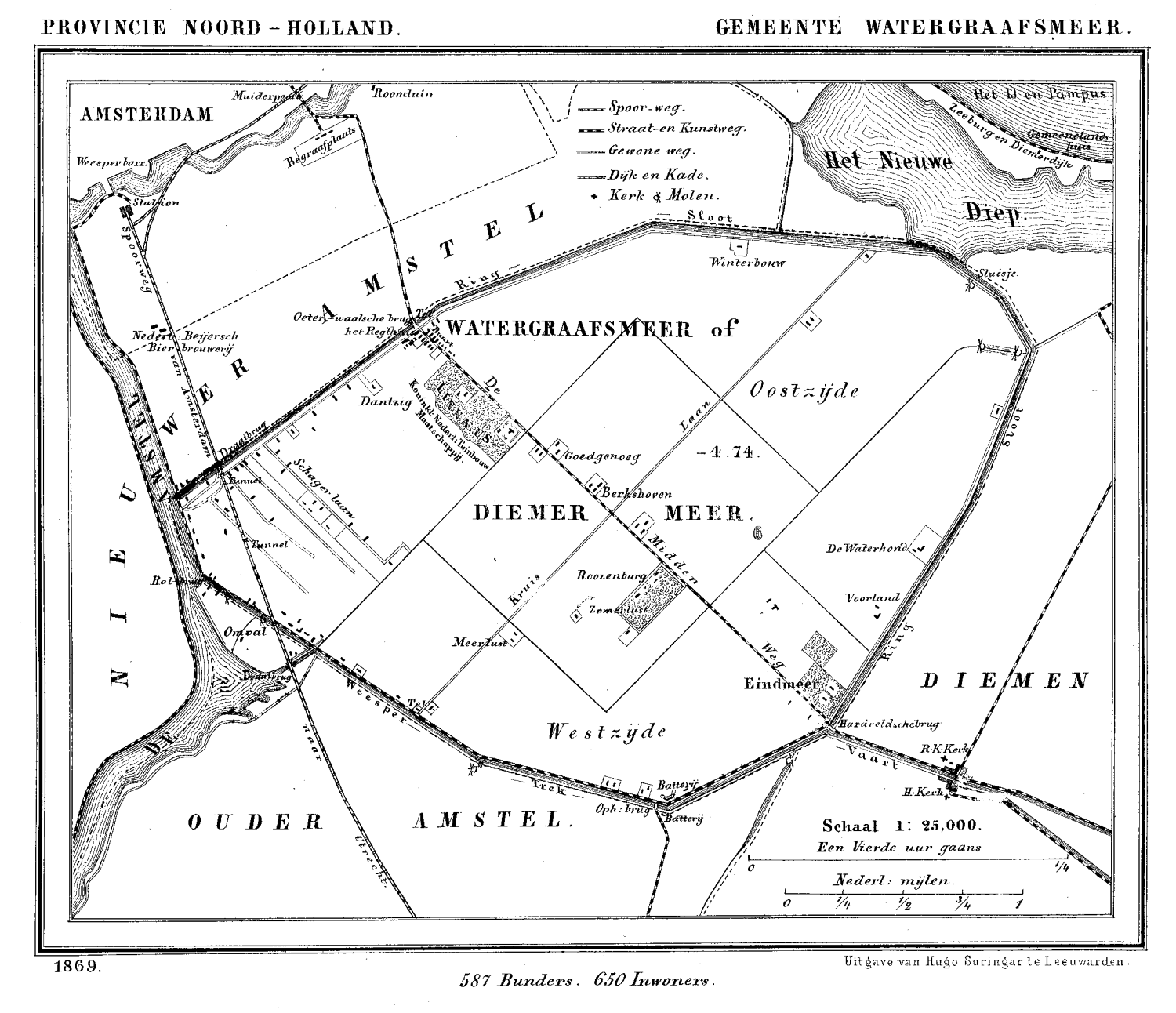
Map of the former municipality Watergraafsmeer in 1869

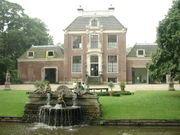
Buitenplaats Frankendael

The Watergraafsmeer (Dutch pronunciation: [ˌʋaːtərɣraːfsˈmeːr]) is a polder in North Holland, Netherlands, reclaimed from the lake Diemermeer in 1629. In the 17th and 18th centuries, there were many buitenplaatsen in the Watergraafsmeer, though nowadays only one, Frankendael, remains. It is among the lowest-lying parts of Amsterdam (approximately 5 metres below the NAP).

Since 1921, the Watergraafsmeer is part of the city of Amsterdam and its rural character has all but disappeared. It is located in the borough of Amsterdam-Oost. The most important streets in the Watergraafsmeer are the Middenweg and the Kruislaan.

== History ==
During the 17th and 18th centuries, a number of wealthy Amsterdammers (inhabitants of Amsterdam) built buitenplaatsen in the Watergraafsmeer. Today, only the buitenplaats of Frankendael remains. On the Maliebaan, people played jeu de mail.

From 1 May 1817 until 1 January 1921, Watergraafsmeer was an independent municipality with approximately ten thousand inhabitants. In the early 20th century, it was mainly agricultural, with horticulture and cattle breeding.

== Famous people ==
- Johan Cruyff, football player
- Max Euwe, Dutch chess player, Dutch chess champion, world chess champion (1935-37), international chess arbiter
- Nola Hatterman, actress and painter
- Samuel Jessurun de Mesquita, graphic artist
- Gerard Reve, Dutch writer
- Karel van het Reve, Dutch writer, translator, literary historian
