= Transvaalbuurt =

Coordinates: 52°21′14.19″N 4°55′11.49″E

- Neighborhood of Amsterdam
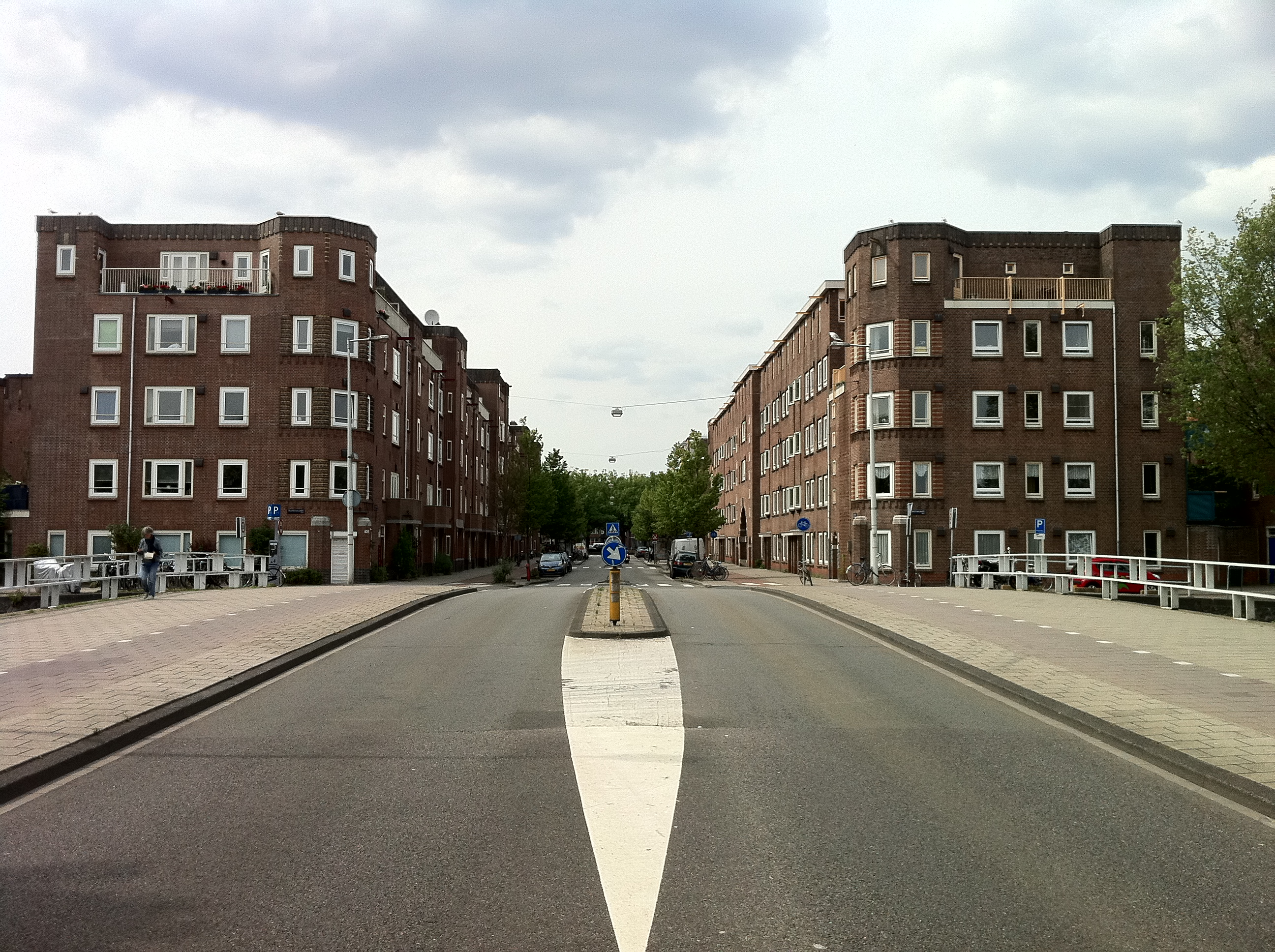
- Interactive map of Transvaalbuurt
- Country: Netherlands
- Province: North Holland
- COROP: Amsterdam
- Time zone: UTC+1 (CET)

Transvaalbuurt is a neighborhood of Amsterdam, Netherlands.

== Origin ==
The Transvaalbuurt was part of the municipality of Nieuwer Amstel until it was annexed by the city of Amsterdam in 1896 as part of its annexation of the northern part of Nieuwer Amstel. In the years 1910–20, construction commenced. The street plan was designed by famous Dutch architect and city planner Hendrik Petrus Berlage.

== History ==
=== German occupation ===
Before the Second World War, the Transvaalbuurt had a large Jewish population. During the German occupation of the Netherlands, a large part of this population was deported.
