= Boroughs of Amsterdam =

Administrative divisions of Amsterdam

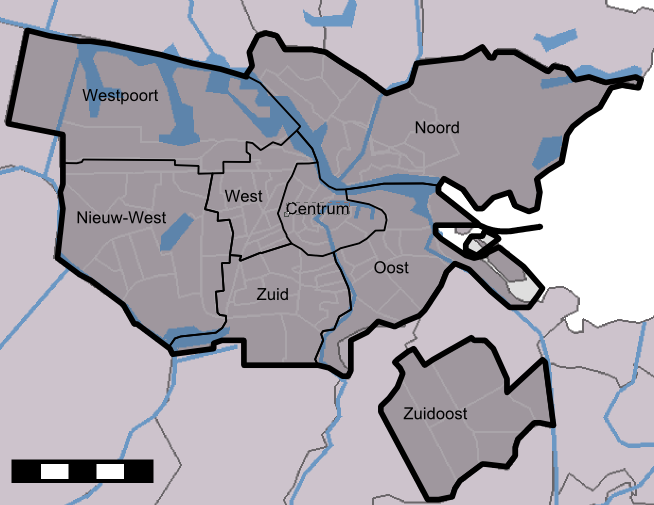
- Category: Urban district
- Location: Amsterdam, Netherlands
- Created: December 1981
- Number: 7 (and 1 urban area) (as of 2022)
- Populations: 86,862–157,964 (excluding Westpoort)
- Government: District committee (7)

The boroughs of Amsterdam (Dutch: stadsdelen; lit. "city parts") are the seven principal subdivisions of the municipality of Amsterdam, Netherlands. Each borough is governed by a directly elected district committee (bestuurscommissie). The first Amsterdam boroughs were created in 1981, with other boroughs created in later years. The last area to be granted the status of borough was Amsterdam-Centrum (2002). The existing system of seven boroughs, covering most parts of Amsterdam, is the result of a major borough reform in 2010. The current boroughs have populations of around 80,000 to 150,000, which is the equivalent to an average-sized municipality in the Netherlands. Since 2022, there is also the urban area (Dutch: stadsgebied) Weesp.

== Borough government ==
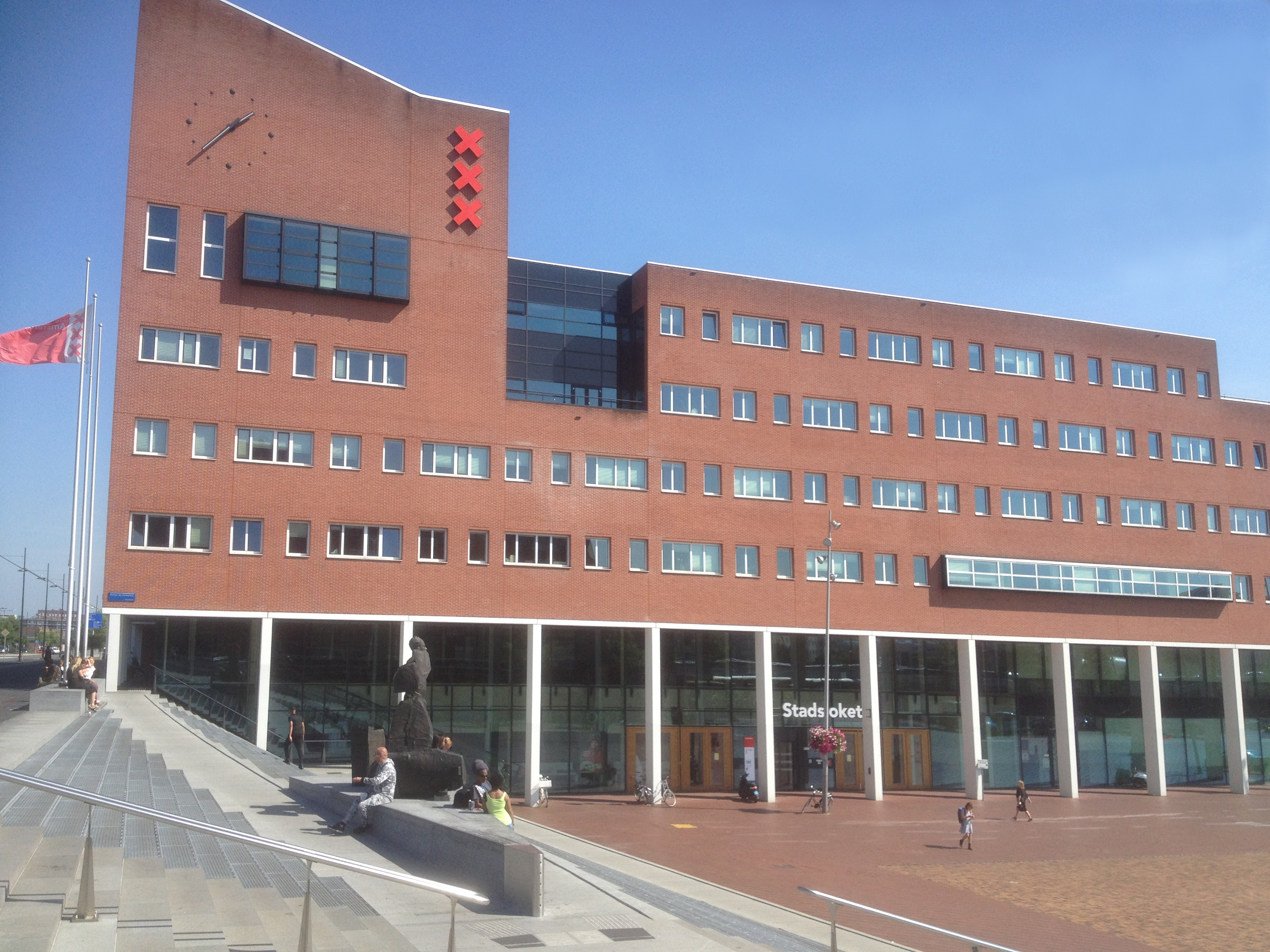
Stadsdeelkantoor (district office) of the borough of Amsterdam-Zuidoost

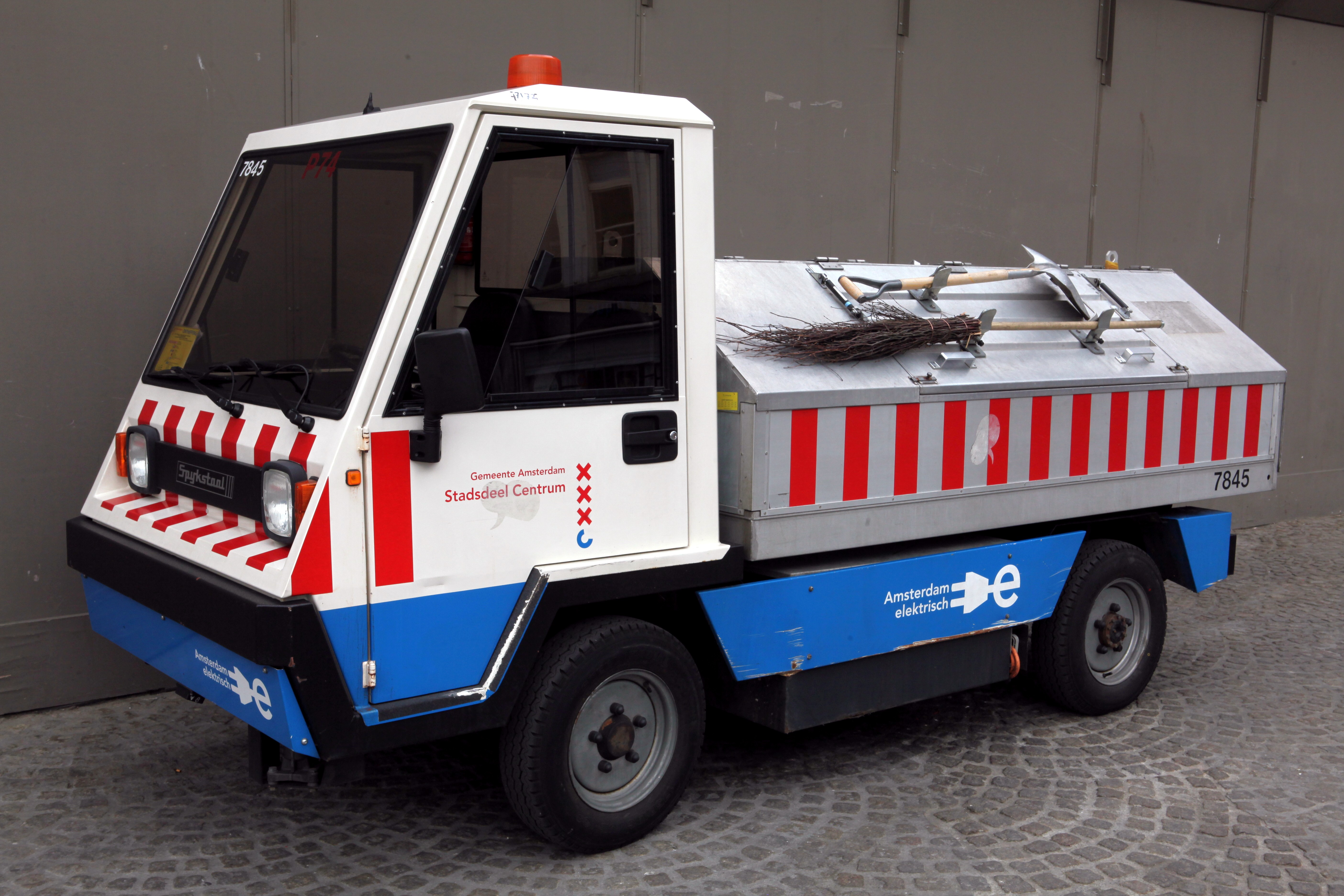
Residual waste collection by the borough of Amsterdam-Centrum

Until 2014, the Amsterdam boroughs had the status of submunicipalities (deelgemeenten), a form of government which existed only in Amsterdam and Rotterdam. Westpoort, however, was governed by the central municipal authorities and therefore not a submunicipality. The submunicipalities were recognised under the Dutch Municipalities Act and enjoyed far-going autonomy, with the central municipal authorities abiding to the "submunicipalities decide, unless" principle. The submunicipalities were governed by a directly elected district council (deelraad) as well as a separate district executive board, the members of which were appointed and controlled by the council. The central municipal authorities retained some power, especially in the areas of public order (police), budget, public transport and social security.

In 2013, the States General of the Netherlands adopted a revision of the Municipalities Act abolishing submunicipalities as a form of government. Since the 2014 municipal elections, therefore, the Amsterdam district councils have ceased to exist. Under a municipal ordinance, however, they were replaced by smaller, but still directly elected district committees (bestuurscommissies). All Dutch nationals, all EU nationals, as well as non-EU nationals who have lived in the Netherlands for at least three consecutive years, are eligible to vote for the district committee of the Amsterdam borough in which they live according to the city's civil register. Each district committee elects three of its members to form an executive committee (dagelijks bestuur).

The district committees' jurisdiction is determined by the central municipal council. Responsibilities delegated to the 2018-2022 district committees include parks and recreation, streets and squares, refuse collection, permits and events, preparation of zoning plans, passports and drivers licenses, and welfare work. As the new district committees depend on powers being delegated by the central municipal council, their position is far less autonomous than their predecessors. Instead, the district committees are considered to be the local 'eyes and ears' of the central municipal authorities, carrying out their delegated powers within the frameworks determined by the municipal council and the college van burgemeester en wethouders.

== List of boroughs ==
Since 2010, there are 7 boroughs (stadsdelen). Westpoort (West Gateway) is not a borough, because it has a low population and it is directly governed by the municipality.

Borough	Area	Population	Population density	Location (in green)	Neighbourhoods
Centrum (Centre)	8.04 km^{2}	86,422	13,748/km²		Binnenstad, Grachtengordel, Haarlemmerbuurt, Jodenbuurt, Jordaan, Kadijken, Lastage, Oosterdokseiland, Oostelijke Eilanden, Plantage, Rapenburg, Uilenburg, Westelijke Eilanden, Weteringschans
Nieuw-West (New West)	32.38 km^{2}	151,677	4,478/km²		Geuzenveld, Nieuw Sloten, Oostoever, Osdorp, Overtoomse Veld, Sloten, Slotermeer, Slotervaart
Noord (North)	49.01 km^{2}	94,766	2,269/km²		Banne Buiksloot, Buiksloot, Buikslotermeer, Floradorp, Kadoelen, Molenwijk, Nieuwendam, Nieuwendammerdijk en Buiksloterdijk, Oostzanerwerf, Overhoeks, Tuindorp Nieuwendam, Tuindorp Oostzaan
Oost (East)	30.56 km^{2}	135,767	7,635/km²		IJburg, Indische Buurt, Eastern Docklands, Oud-Oost, Watergraafsmeer
West	9.89 km^{2}	143,842	15,252/km²		Frederik Hendrikbuurt, Houthaven, Spaarndammerbuurt, Staatsliedenbuurt, Zeeheldenbuurt, Westerpark, Kinkerbuurt, Overtoombuurt, De Baarsjes, Bos en Lommer, Kolenkitbuurt, Landlust, Sloterdijk
Zuid (South)	17.41 km^{2}	144,432	9,349/km²		Apollobuurt, Buitenveldert, Hoofddorppleinbuurt, Museumkwartier, De Pijp, Prinses Irenebuurt, Rivierenbuurt, Schinkelbuurt, Stadionbuurt, Vondelpark, Willemspark, Zuidas
Zuidoost (Southeast)	22.08 km^{2}	87,854	4,391/km²		Bijlmermeer, Venserpolder, Gaasperdam, Driemond, Weesp

== Urban area ==
There is 1 urban area (stadsgebied) Weesp. Weesp merged with Amsterdam in 2022. It is located to the east of Zuidoost.

Urban area	Area	Population	Population density	Location (in green)	Villages
Weesp	24.16 km^{2}	20,445	897/km²		Driemond
