= Old Stadion (Amsterdam) =

Stadium in Amsterdam, Netherlands

Oude Stadion
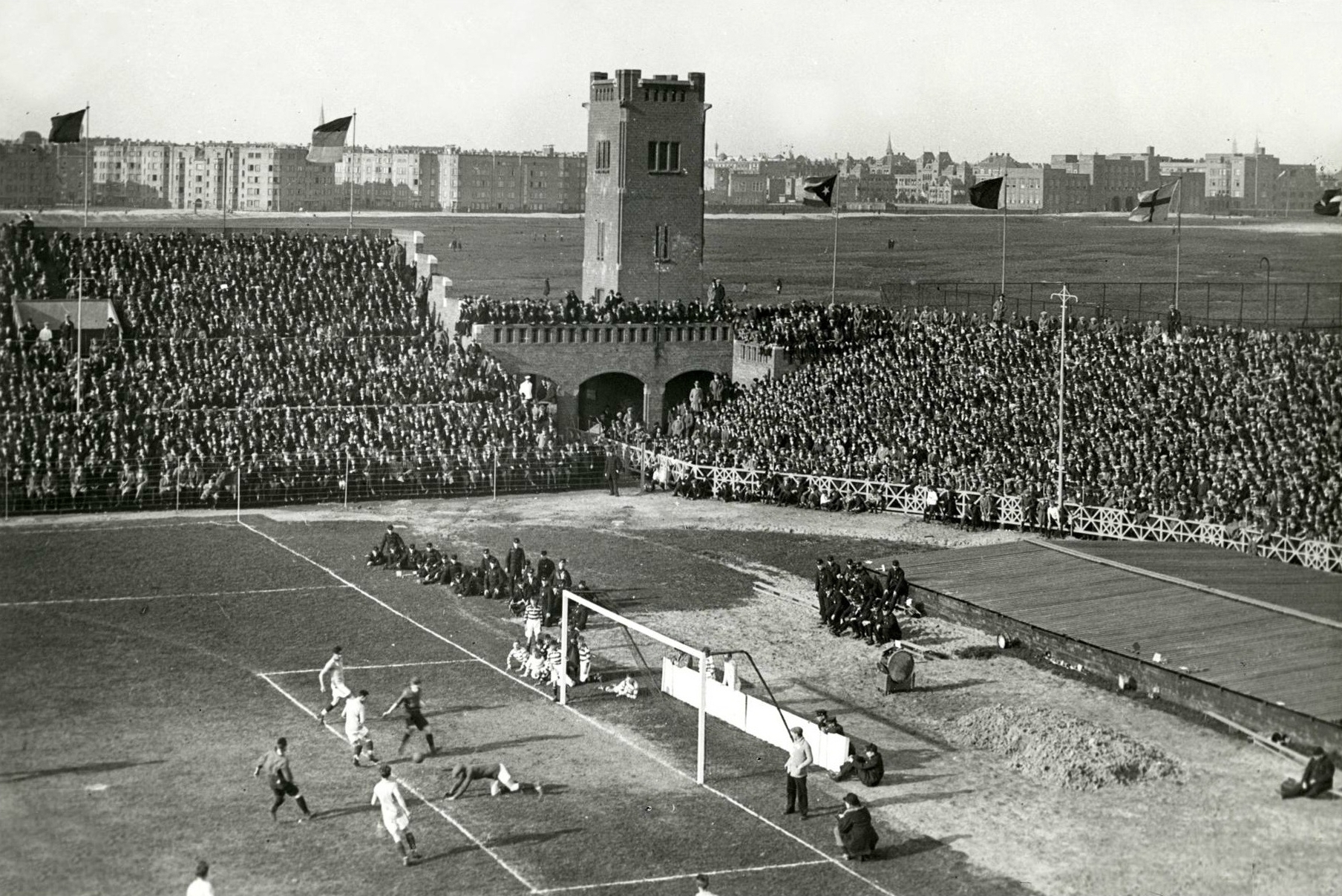
- Interactive map of Oude Stadion
- Full name: Nederlandsch Sportpark
- Former names: Harry Elte Stadium
- Location: Amsterdam, Netherlands
- Coordinates: 52.344506°N 4.859717°E
- Capacity: 29,000 seats
- Surface: Grass

Construction
- Built: 1913–1914
- Renovated: 1928
- Demolished: 1929
- Architect: Harry Elte

Tenant
- FC Blauw-Wit

The Oude Stadion (Old Stadium), officially known as Het Nederlandsch Sportpark (The Dutch Sports Park), and colloquially known as the Stadion (until 1928), was a multi-purpose sports stadium located in Amsterdam in the Netherlands. The stadium was built after the design by Harry Elte, with which he had won the contest for a national stadium in 1912.

The stadium was completed in 1914. For some time it was the only stadium with brick stands in the country. Prior to the construction of the Olympic Stadium used for the 1928 Summer Olympics, it was the primary stadium used for the city until the 1928 Games. This was to the fact that the stadium could not handle track running and track cycling events though it could accommodate football games, seating 29,000.

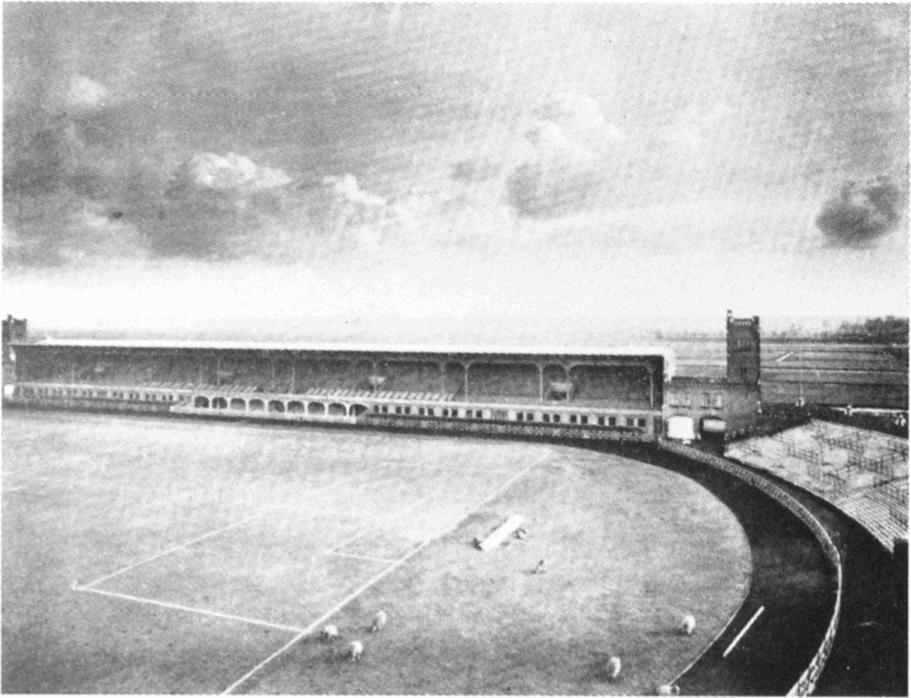
The Old Stadion in 1914

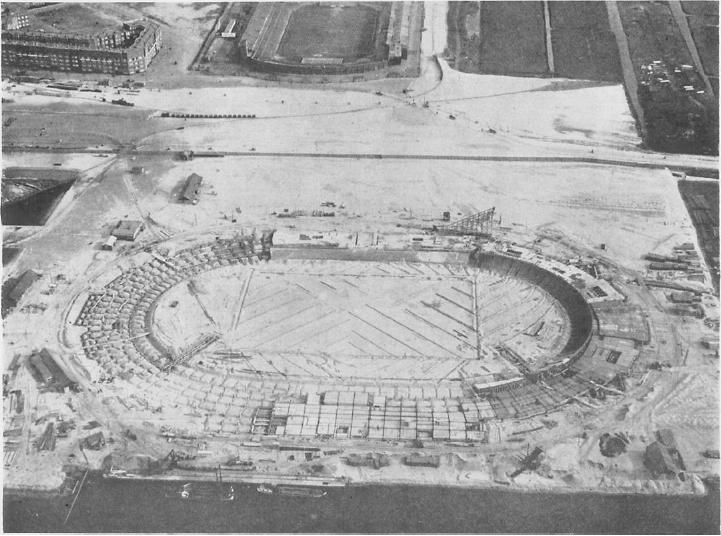
Construction of the Amsterdam Olympic Stadium, next to the Old Stadion

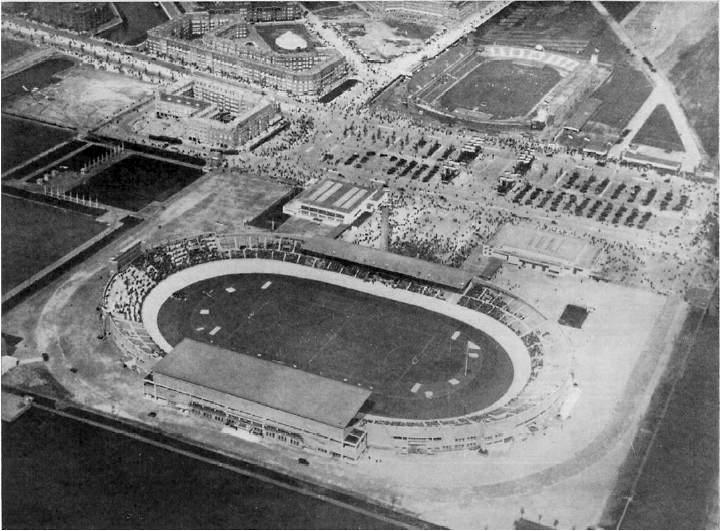
Finished Olympic Stadium with the Old Stadion in the background

The addition of running lanes and a cycling track would have reduced the capacity to 17,000. Despite this, the old stadium did host some of the field hockey and football events for the 1928 Games.

The stadium was demolished in 1929 to make way for the projected housing, part of Hendrik Petrus Berlage's Plan Zuid. The area is still known as Stadionbuurt, after the Old Stadium.
