= Olympic Stadium (Amsterdam) =

Stadium in Amsterdam, Netherlands

- Stadion Amsterdam

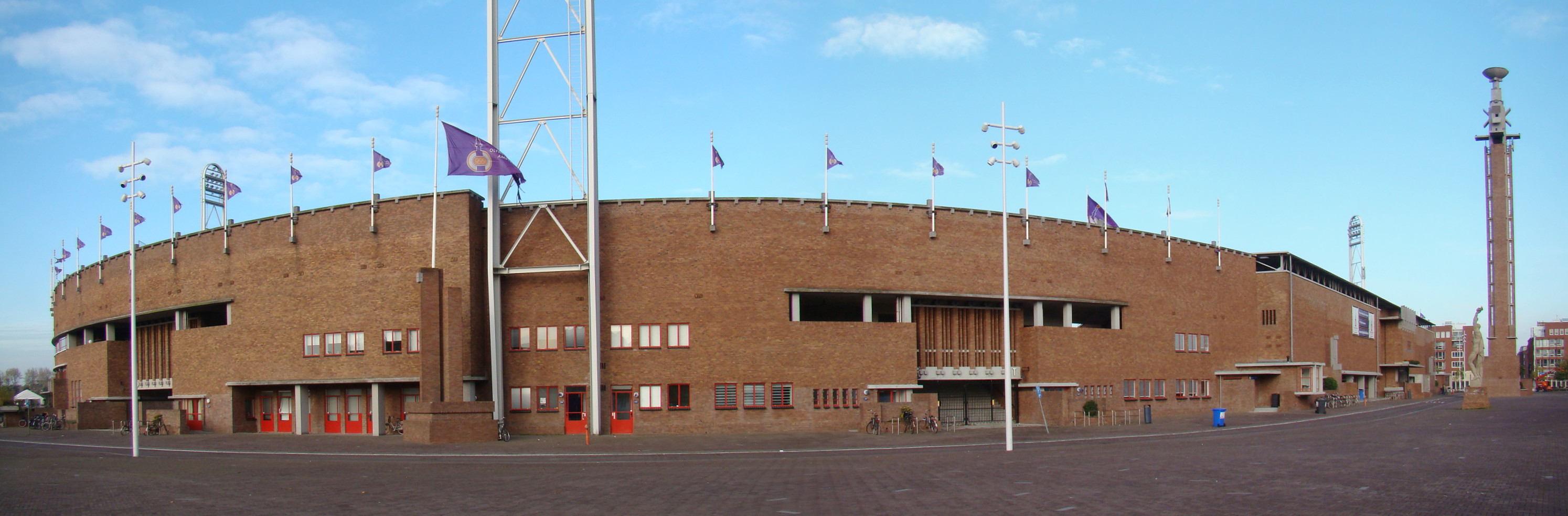
- Panorama of the stadium in 2008
- Interactive map of Olympic Stadium
- Location: Amsterdam, Netherlands
- Coordinates: 52°20′36″N 4°51′15″E
- Owner: Gemeente Amsterdam
- Capacity: 22,288
- Surface: Grass
- Current use: Athletics; Concerts

Construction
- Groundbreaking: 18 May 1927
- Opened: 17 May 1928; 98 years ago
- Renovated: 1996–2000
- Architect: Jan Wils

Tenants
- Ajax (1930–1996, select. matches); Blauw-Wit (1928–1972); DWS (1928–1972); FC Amsterdam (1972–1980); Amsterdam Admirals (1995–1996); Phanos (athletics) (?–?)

Website
- olympischstadion.nl

The Olympic Stadium (Dutch: Olympisch Stadion, Dutch pronunciation: [oːˈlɪmpiˌstaːdijɔn], currently named Stadion Amsterdam) is a stadium which was used as the main stadium for the 1928 Summer Olympics in Amsterdam. The venue is currently used mostly for athletics, other sports events, and music concerts.

When completed, the stadium had a capacity of 31,600. Following the completion of the rival De Kuip stadium in Rotterdam in 1937, the Amsterdam authorities increased the capacity of the Olympic Stadium to 64,000 by adding a second ring to the stadium. In 1987, the stadium was listed as a national monument.

Ajax used the Olympic Stadium for international games until 1996, when the Amsterdam Arena, now called Johan Cruyff Arena since 2018, was completed. Renovation started in 1996, and the stadium was refurbished into the original construction of 1928. The second ring of 1937 was removed, reducing capacity to 22,288, and the stadium was made suitable for track and field competitions again.

Since 2005, the stadium is home to a sports museum, the Olympic Experience Amsterdam.

== Architecture and design ==
The Olympic Stadium was designed by architect Jan Wils, and is one of the finest examples of Amsterdamse School architecture, complementing the surrounding neighbourhood designed by H.P. Berlage. The design won the Olympic gold medal in the architecture competition at the 1928 Olympics. The concrete second ring that was added in 1937 to the north and south wing of the stadium was also designed by Jan Wils.

=== Development history ===
The original plan of Jan Wils consisted of an extension of the Harry Elte stadium that was situated next to the current Olympic Stadium. This plan was rejected as the municipal government of Amsterdam had planned an important urban development programme in that area, and wanted to demolish the stadium as soon as possible. The second plan was almost fully executed, and consisted of a new Olympic Stadium that was situated more westward. In January 1926, the Amsterdam municipal government, the National Olympic Committee and the NV Nederlandsch Sportpark—the owner of the Harry Elte stadium—reached an agreement; after the Olympic Games of 1928, the Harry Elte stadium would be demolished and the NV Nederlandsch Sportpark would be the owner of the Olympic Stadium. Starting in January 1926, the area in which the stadium was to be built was elevated by means of 750,000 cubic metres of sand. This phase was completed in October of that year and in the same month the construction of the pile foundation began. On 18 May 1927, the ceremonial first stone was placed by Prince Hendrik. Some two million stones would follow.

=== Characteristics ===
The Olympic Stadium during the Olympic Games of 1928

The football pitch measures 114 by 75 metres. The athletics track around it is eight metres wide and has a perimeter of 400 metres. The cycle track around the athletics track was nine metres wide and had a perimeter of 500 metres. It also hosted the equestrian jumping, field hockey, gymnastics and korfball (demonstration) events.

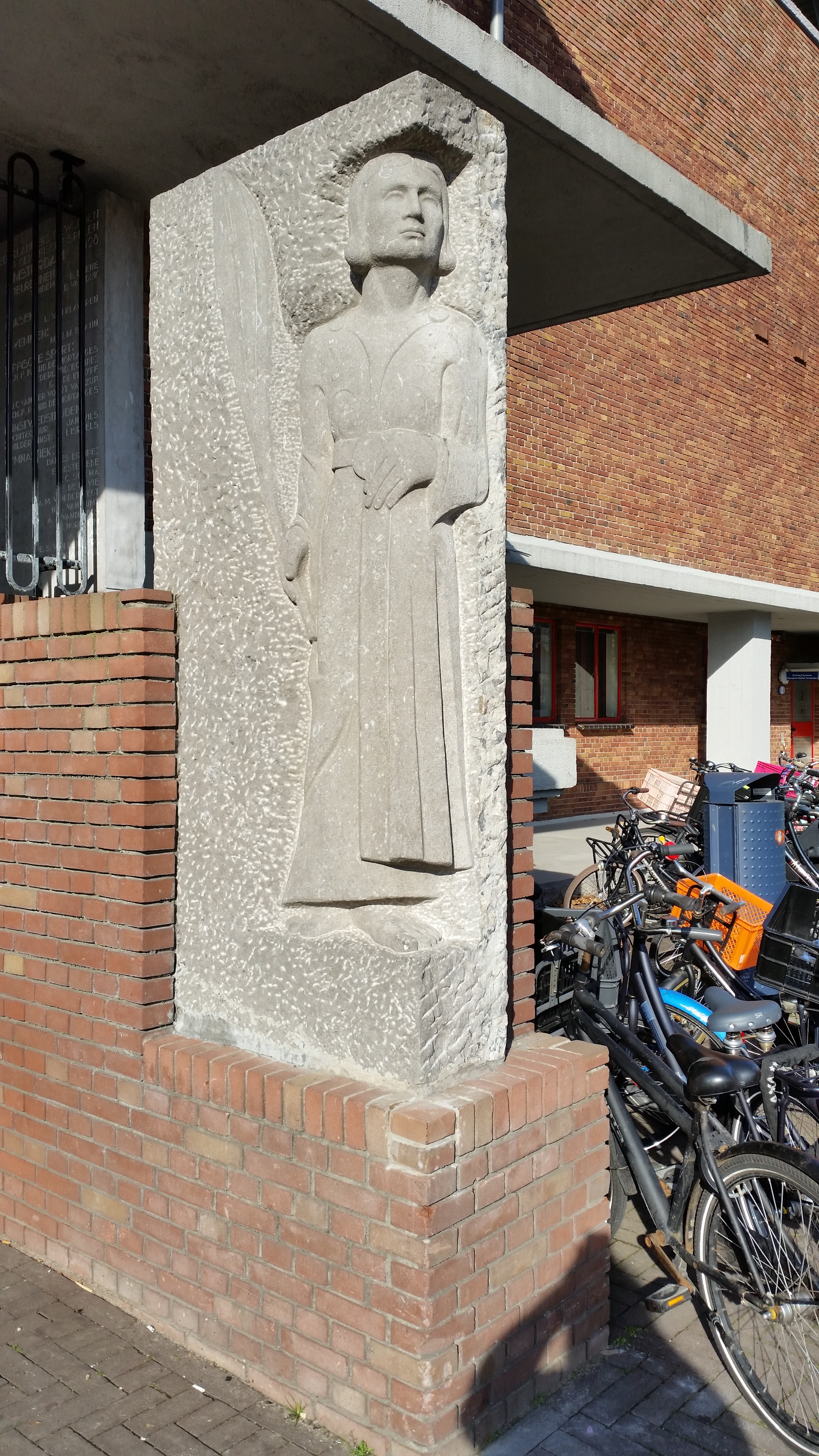
"Athlete and femmale figure" sculpture at the stadium's entrancy

The capacity of the stadium is subject to controversy as the exact capacity was kept secret to press and public during the Games to evade the remark that the stadium's capacity was only marginally bigger than the Harry Elte stadium. It is said that two configurations could be set up in the stadium; one with 21,537 seats and 12,618 standing rooms (33,255 total) and one with 16,197 seats and 25,236 standing rooms (41,433 total). After the Games the NOC admitted that the capacity of the stadium was somewhere near 31,600. Additional seats could be added on the cycle track, which would increase the capacity by 5,900.

The 1928 Olympics introduced the idea of the Olympic Flame. The flame burned for the first time ever in a tall tower, known as the Marathon tower, adjacent to the Olympic Stadium. In the top of the Marathon tower, four balconies are situated which were used during the Games by horn blowers. Above these balconies four speakers from Philips were attached, from which results and messages were broadcast into the Olympic area, a novelty at the time. The bowl on top which carried the Olympic flame was known to Amsterdammers as "the ashtray of KLM pilots". A permanent Olympic flame burning during the tournament was also an Olympic first.

=== 1996 renovation ===
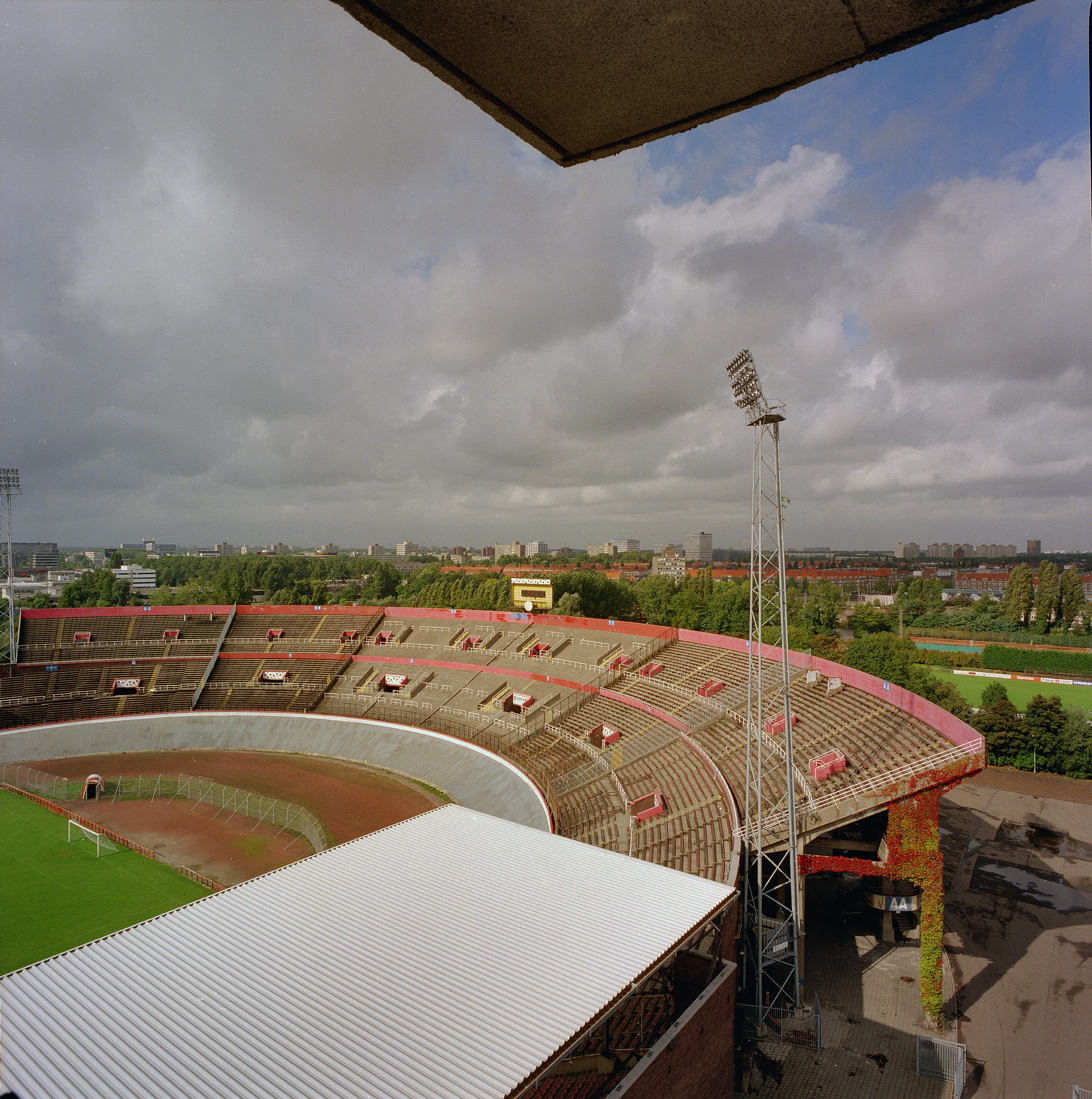
The 1937 second ring in 1995, a year before it was removed as part of the 1996 renovation

In 1987 the city government announced plans to demolish the stadium. The stadium was saved, however, when it was listed as a national monument. Renovation started in 1996, and the stadium was refurbished into the original construction of 1928. The second ring of 1937 was removed, and the stadium was made suitable for track and field competitions again. The original bicycle track was also removed to enable the use of the space beneath the seats for offices. The stadium was reopened by the then Prince of Orange Willem-Alexander on 13 May 2000.

In 2007, the area around the stadium was renovated as part of larger urban renewal project covering the entire Olympic area. North of the stadium 969 houses were completed in 2008. In the same year, the islands in the river Schinkel to the west of the stadium were suited with tennis fields and football pitches, an athletics track and a park. The Stadionplein square in front of the stadium was also recently renovated.

Two new bridges were also built around the stadium: to the south there is a new bridge suitable for all traffic, the Na Druk Gelukbrug, and to the Schinkel islands in the west there is a cyclists and pedestrian bridge, called Jan Wilsbrug.

== Use after the Olympic Games ==
The stadium hosted several international matches of the Netherlands national football team, the first one being the game against Uruguay (0–2) during the Summer Olympics on 30 May 1928. The last one was a friendly on 6 September 1989 against Denmark (2–2).

Exterior of the stadium in 1950

After the Olympics, the stadium was used regularly for various sporting events, including athletics, speedway, field hockey and cycling. The 1954 Tour de France, for example, started outside the stadium. However, it was football that remained the most popular. It was both the home ground of Blauw Wit and BVC Amsterdam (later merged into FC Amsterdam), while Ajax used the stadium for games in which the crowd was expected to exceed the capacity of its own De Meer Stadion (in practice, most of their international matches) or for midweek games which required the use of floodlights, with which the De Meer was not initially suited. Ajax continued this arrangement until the completion of the Amsterdam Arena in 1996, since 2018 renamed the Johan Cruijff Arena.

The Olympic Stadium was the host venue for the 1987 FIM Speedway World Championship Final. The event, held for the first and only time over two days (thus consisting of two separate meetings with the riders aggregate score determining their placing), was won by defending World Champion Hans Nielsen from Denmark. Second was fellow Dane and former twice (1984 and 1985) World Champion Erik Gundersen, while finishing third was American rider Sam Ermolenko (himself a future World Champion in 1993). The speedway track was laid out over the stadiums existing 400 metres (440 yd) athletics track. The only Dutchman in the field Henny Kroeze (who had been seeded to the final so as to have at least one Dutch rider in the field), finished 16th and last in the Final after scoring only one point over the two days with the point coming in his fifth and final ride of the first day.

The Amsterdam Admirals played their inaugural season in the World League of American Football in 1995, and the 1996 season, at the stadium, prior to moving to the Amsterdam Arena. The stadium hosted World Bowl '95.

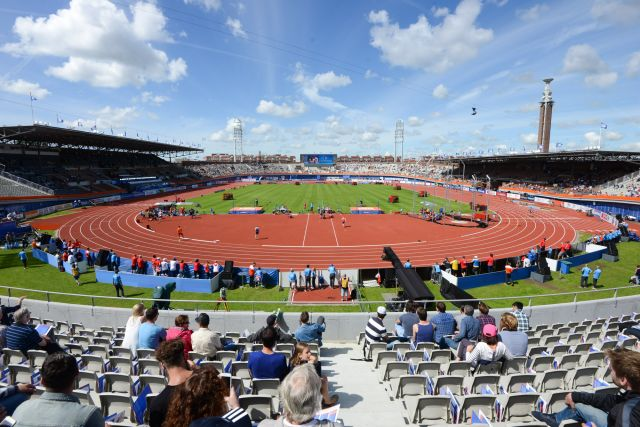
The Olympic Stadium during the 2016 European Athletics Championships

The stadium hosted the 2016 European Athletics Championships. Because of this, an athletics track was added to the plan for the nearby Park Schinkeleilanden at the last moment. The athletics track in that nearby park, which could be a warming up track when using the main track in the Olympic Stadium for racing, was opened in 2008. The stadium also serves as the start and finish of the Amsterdam Marathon, held every October.

In 2014, the stadium was temporarily fitted with a long track speedskating rink, and hosted the Dutch national championship in Allround and Sprint. This was repeated in 2018 to host the World Allround Championships.^{[9]}

The stadium is also a tourist attraction. Tourists especially come from the Netherlands, Germany, Greece, Belgium and Canada, and tours are available in Dutch, German, Greek, English and French.

The Olympic stadium now also offers spaces around the field for over 30 businesses.

== Famous football games ==
Famous games, apart from the Olympic Games, include:

- 1962 European Cup final between Benfica and Real Madrid, ended 5–3 for Benfica.
- De Mistwedstrijd ("The Fog Match"); Ajax's 5–1 victory over Liverpool on 7 December 1966.
- 1972 Intercontinental Cup second leg between Ajax (winners of the European Cup) and Independiente from Argentina (winners of the Copa Libertadores). The match ended in a 3–0 win for Ajax, after a 1–1 draw in Argentina.
- 1977 European Cup Winners' Cup final between Hamburger SV and Anderlecht, Hamburger SV won 2–0.
- The second leg of the 1981 UEFA Cup final between Ipswich Town and AZ (then known as AZ '67). AZ won the match 4–2, but with Ipswich winning the first leg 3–0 at Portman Road, Ipswich won the trophy 5–4 on aggregate.
- The second leg of the 1992 UEFA Cup final between Ajax and Torino. The match ended in a 0–0 draw, but as the result of the first game in Stadio delle Alpi had been another draw (2–2), Ajax won the trophy on away goals.
- The second leg of the 1995 UEFA Super Cup between Ajax and Spanish side Real Zaragoza on 28 February 1996. After a 1–1 draw in Spain, Ajax won the home game 4–0.

== See also ==
- List of football stadiums in the Netherlands
- Lists of stadiums

Events and tenants
Preceded by Stade de Colombes; Paris	Summer Olympics; Main venue (Olympic Stadium); 1928	Succeeded by Olympic Stadium; Los Angeles
Preceded by Stade de Colombes; Paris	Summer Olympics; Olympic Athletics competitions Main venue 1928	Succeeded by Olympic Stadium; Los Angeles
Preceded by Stade de Colombes; Paris	Summer Olympics; Men's football final venue 1928	Succeeded by Olympiastadion; Berlin
Preceded by Wankdorf Stadium; Bern	European Cup; Final venue 1962	Succeeded by Wembley Stadium; London
Preceded by Waldstadion; Frankfurt	UCI Track Cycling World Championships venue 1967	Succeeded by Olympic Velodrome; Rome
Preceded by Heysel Stadium; Brussels	European Cup Winners' Cup; Final venue 1977	Succeeded by Parc des Princes; Paris
Preceded by Letzigrund Stadium; Zürich	European Athletics Championships; 2016	Succeeded by Olympiastadion; Berlin
