= Rivierenbuurt =

Neighbourhood of Amsterdam in North Holland, Netherlands

Coordinates: 52°20′43″N 4°53′51″E

- Neighbourhood of Amsterdam
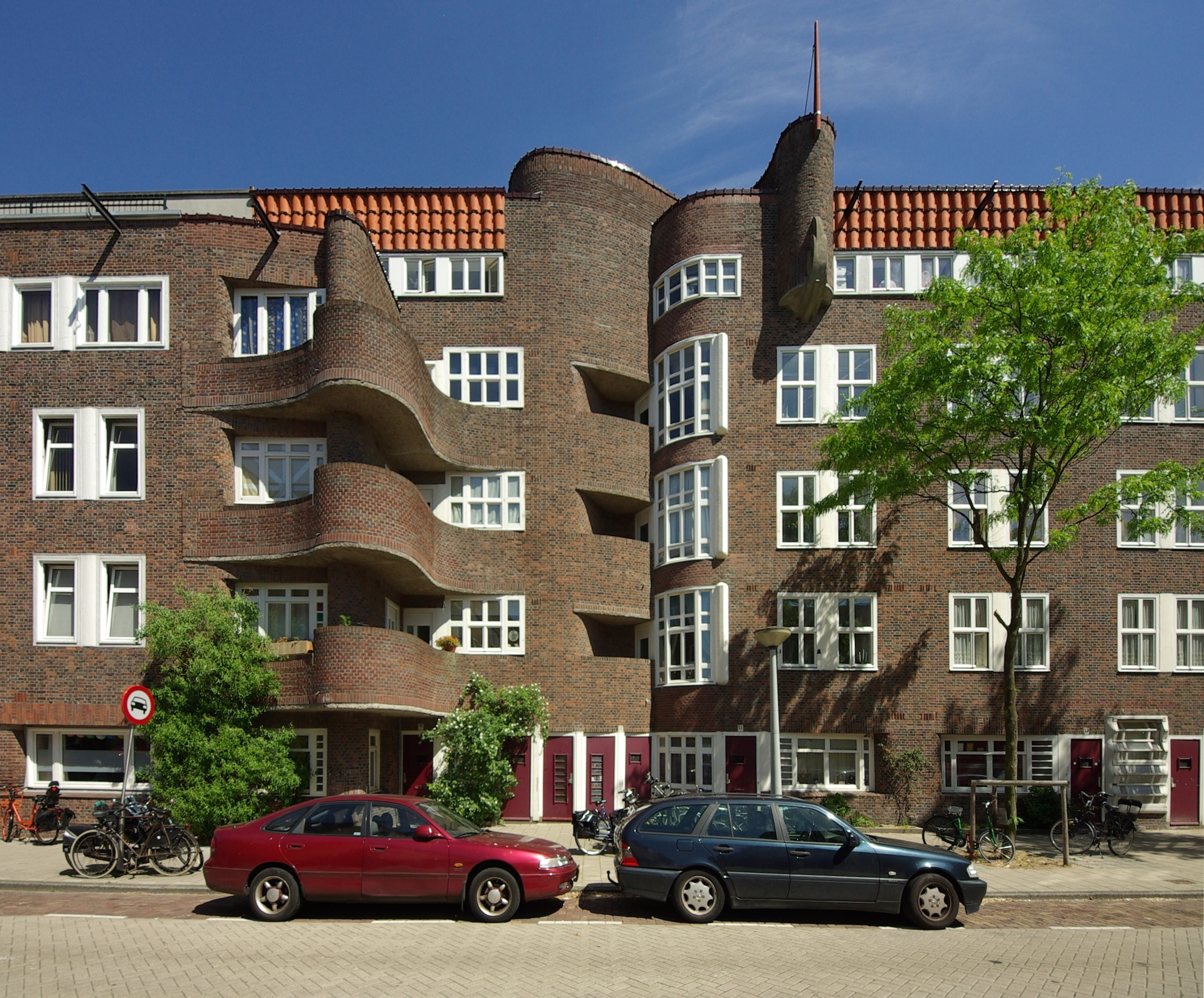
- Amsterdam School architecture, Holendrechtstraat, Rivierenbuurt, designed by Margaret Staal-Kropholler (1923).

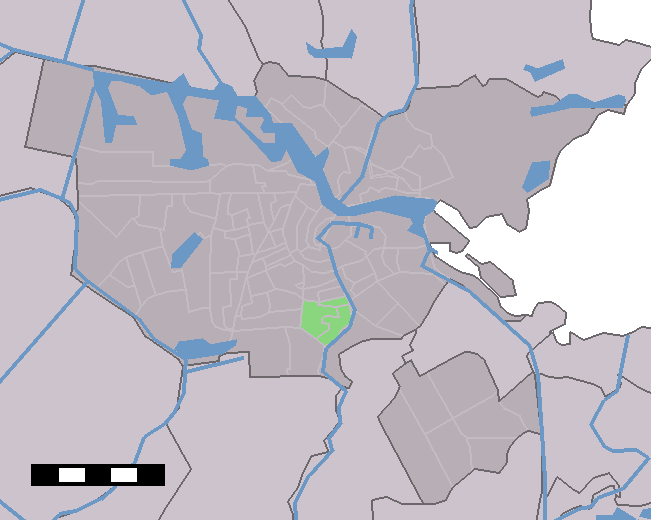
- Country: Netherlands
- Province: North Holland
- COROP: Amsterdam
- Borough: Zuid
- Time zone: UTC+1 (CET)

Rivierenbuurt is a neighbourhood of Amsterdam, Netherlands. The neighbourhood is situated in the eastern part of the Amsterdam borough of Amsterdam-Zuid, bordered by the river Amstel to the east, the Boerenwetering canal in the west, the Amstelkanaal in the north and the A10 motorway in the south. In 2013, the Rivierenbuurt had approximately 28,400 residents.

The Rivierenbuurt was built in the 1920s as a primarily middle-class residential area, part of the Plan Zuid urban expansion programme designed by Dutch architect Hendrik Petrus Berlage. The neighbourhood features many fine examples of Amsterdam School architecture. The Dutch word Rivierenbuurt translates as 'Rivers Neighbourhood'; most streets in the area are named after rivers in the Netherlands.

Until World War II the area had a sizable Jewish population which included Anne Frank and her family, who lived at Merwedeplein square until they went into hiding in the secret annex located in the old city centre.

== History ==
=== Plan Zuid ===
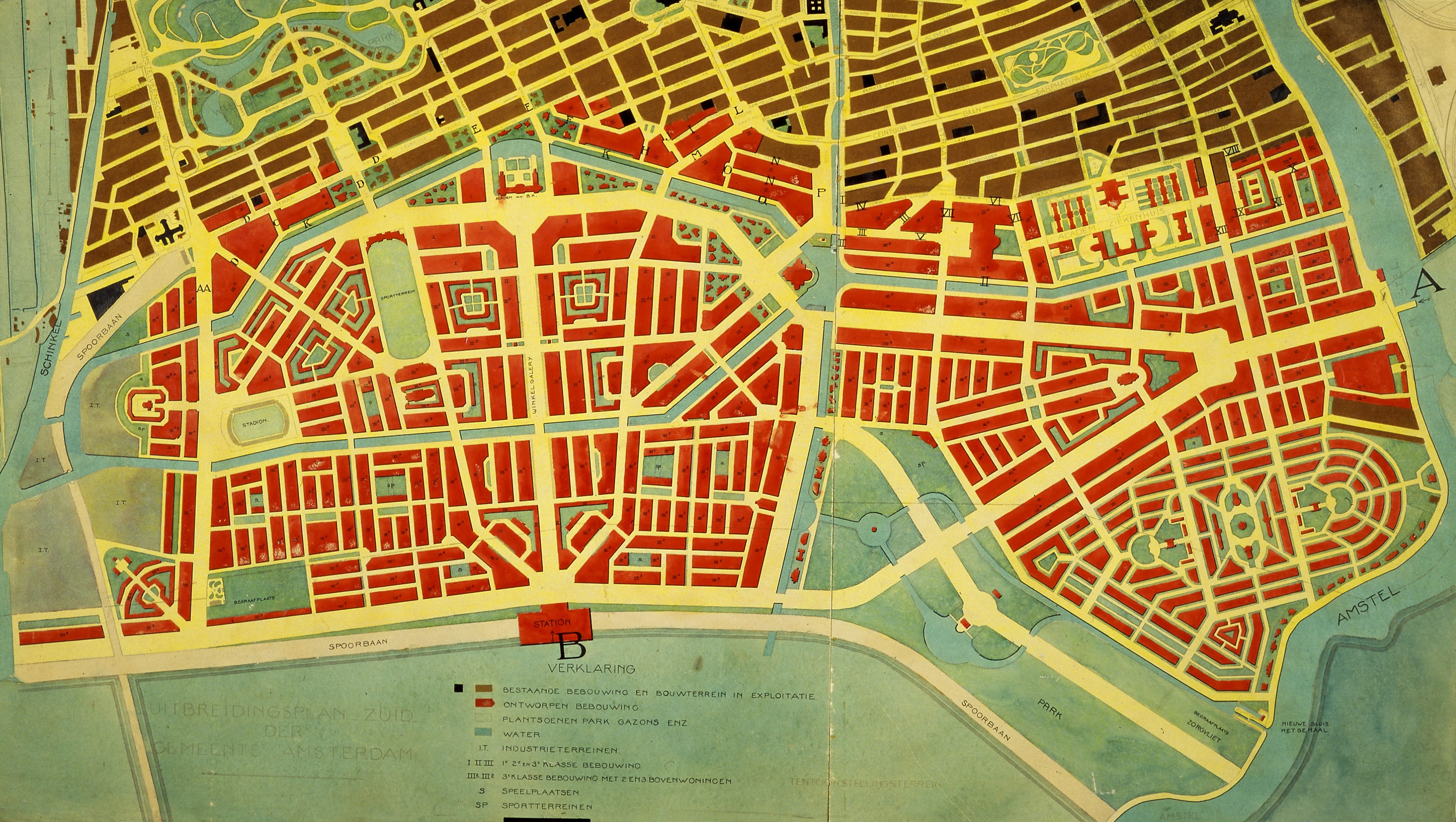
Berlage's revised Plan Zuid (1914). The eastern half became the Rivierenbuurt.

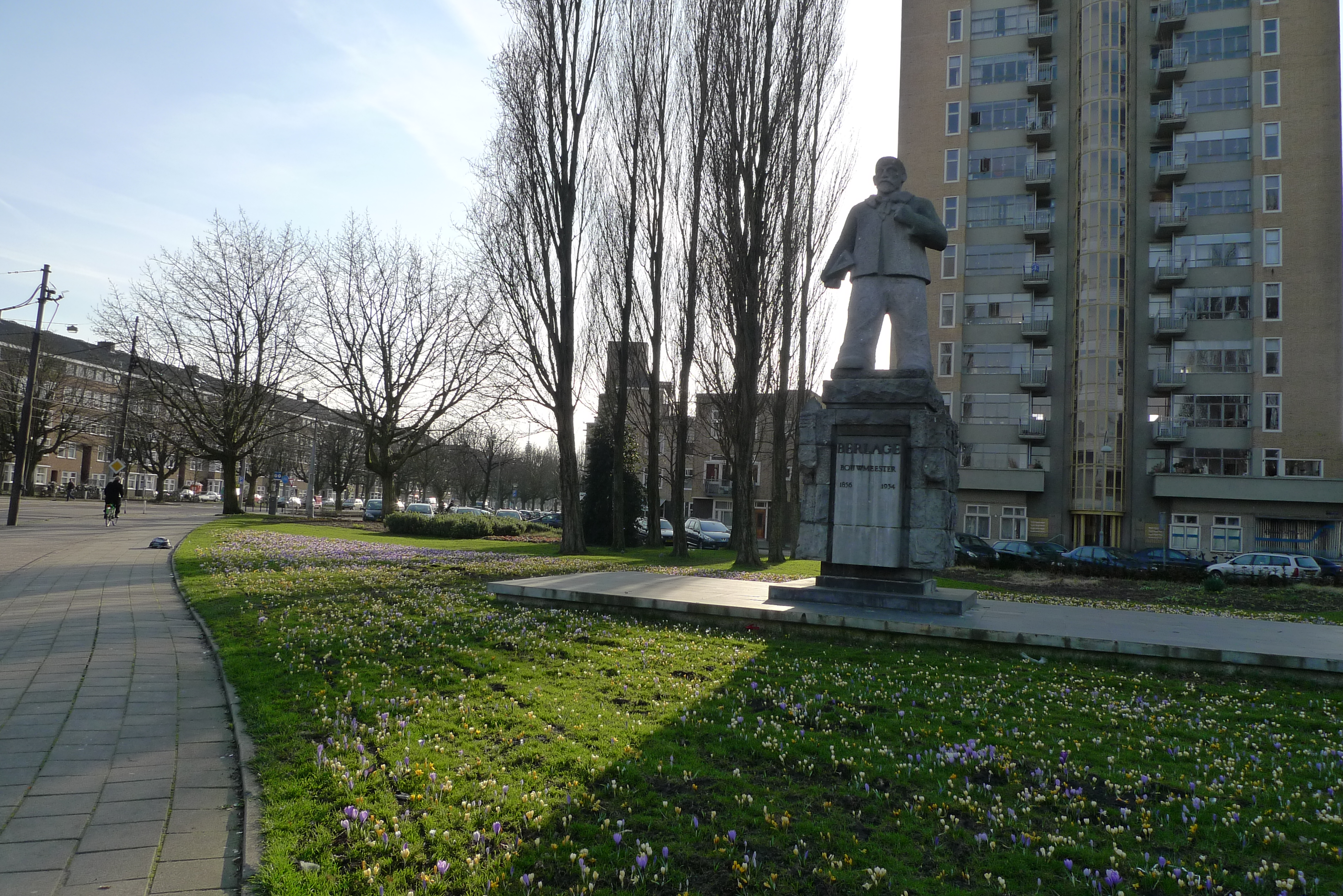
Berlage monument in front of the Wolkenkrabber ('Skycraper'), Victorieplein, Rivierenbuurt, by Hildo Krop (1966).

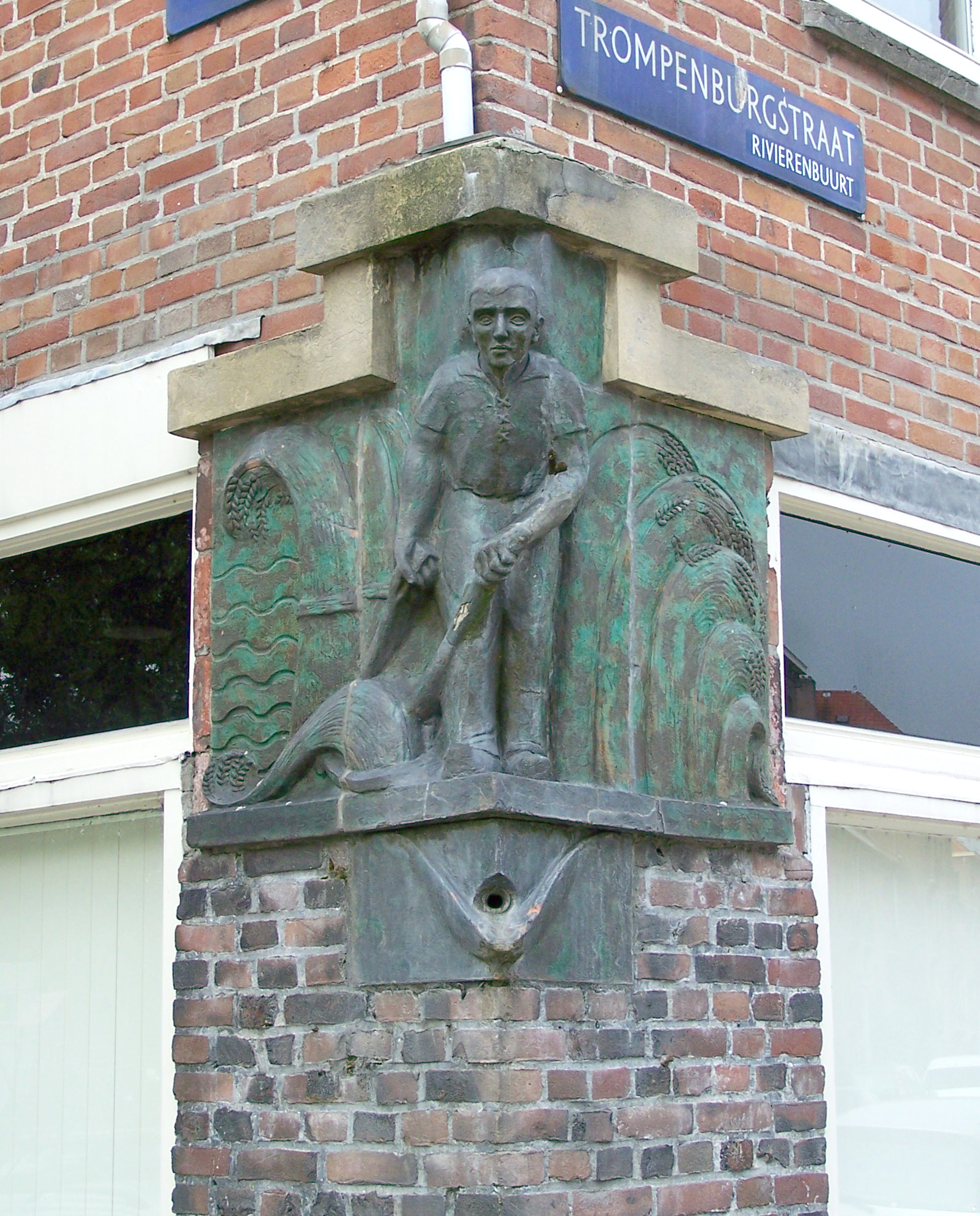
Relief of man with scythe (1927-1928) at the corner of Gaaspstraat and Trompenburgstraat, Rivierenbuurt.

In the second half of the 19th century, the city of Amsterdam grew quickly as a result of the Industrial Revolution taking place in the Netherlands. Between 1870 and 1900, the city's population almost doubled and at the turn of the century, the number of 500,000 inhabitants was reached. Many of the old innercity neighbourhoods had become overcrowded and were suffering from poor living conditions and a lack of sanitary facilities. The last major development had been the construction of the Amsterdam canal belt in the 17th century. To allow the city to expand beyond the canal ring, the wall surrounding it was taken down in stages during the second half of the 19th century. Several new residential areas were being developed, with upscale residences being built around the just-opened Rijksmuseum and workers' and middle-class homes the west and east of the old city, for example in areas now called Oud-West and Oud-Oost.

The city's initial expansion beyond the former city wall was in the hands of private developers, without much public involvement in the neighbourhood planning. In addition, the more affordable housing projects were often of poor construction quality. Therefore, the Amsterdam city council decided to design a more comprehensive plan for further expansion into the rural area south of the city. After several plans by city planners were rejected, the city commissioned Dutch architect Hendrik Petrus Berlage in 1899 to design a masterplan. Berlage's plan, called Plan Zuid, was approved by the city council in 1905.

=== Architecture ===
With Berlage's masterplan in hand, the city started with the process of acquiring the rural estates south of the city through formal expropriation. With this process underway, it became clear that the original plan, which in many ways resembled the old city with its curvy streets and low-rise buildings, would be too expensive and inefficient. Berlage was asked to revise his plan, which he presented in 1914. Compared to the original plan, the second plan is much denser. It contains mostly four-story, rectangular apartment blocks on narrower, linear residential streets. Nevertheless, the new neighbourhoods would have a much more spacious and greener outlook than the earlier expansions. The plan also provided a system of broad, majestic thoroughfares connecting the various neighborhoods.

With the new plan approved by the city council, development in the area began in 1917. The Rivierenbuurt, the eastern section of the plan, was specifically designed for the middle class. The area mainly consists of fully enclosed apartment blocks, many of which were designed in Amsterdam School style. In 1921, the land expropriated here was provided on leasehold to the Amstel building association in which 71 construction companies worked together. Famous architects such as Margaret Staal-Kropholler, Michel de Klerk and Piet Kramer were commissioned to design the apartment blocks. Some of the finest examples of Amsterdam School architecture, characterized by its curvy facades and wealth of fantasy ornaments are found in the northeastern part of the neighborhood, for example at Holendrechtstraat. The association eventually built 1,739 relatively small apartments rented out for 11 to 20 guilders per week. In 1925, the project was completed but 16 of the participating companies had already gone bankrupt. The municipality subsequently acquired considerable property in this section of the Rivierenbuurt.

As economic circumstances changed, many of Berlage's ambitious plans including a monumental local railway station never materialized. The apartment blocks in the southern part of the neighborhood, the last area to be developed, are often built on the basis of standardized plans and as such adhere more to the modernist Nieuwe Zakelijkheid style rather than the more decorative Amsterdam School style. A prominent example is the Twaalfverdiepingenhuis ('Twelve Story House'), an unusually tall building located at Victorieplein, the Y junction of the three main thoroughfares of the neighborhood. Twaalfverdiepingenhuis was designed by J.F. Staal and completed in 1932. It was the tallest residential building in the city at that time and was nicknamed the Wolkenkrabber ('Skyscraper'). Berlage's plans featured multiple such towers throughout the neighborhood, but only the Twaalfverdiepingenhuis was built.

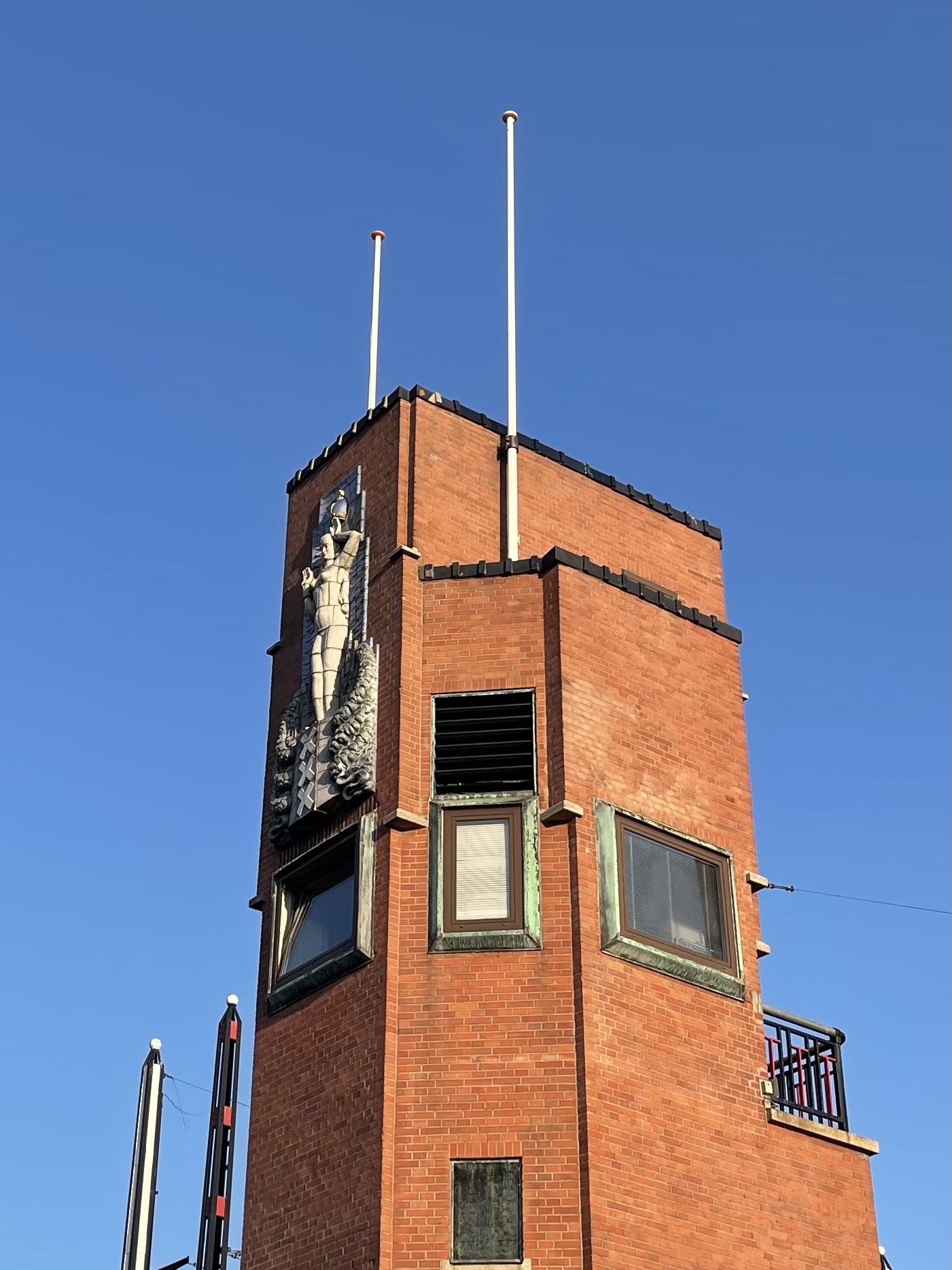
"Genius of Amsterdam" sculpture on the Berlage bridge tower

The last major infrastructural project in Berlage's masterplan for the neighborhood to be carried out was the construction of a bridge over the river Amstel. The design of the project was commissioned to Berlage himself. Construction began in 1928 and was completed in 1932. The north side of the bridge symbolizes the enclosing of the city of Amsterdam. Its monumental tower has a four-meter tall ceramic plate designed by Hildo Krop. The plate shows the Genius of Amsterdam as she emerges from the water. The figure is adorned with the golden imperial crown and is illuminated by a shining sun. The southern side of the bridge symbolizes the countryside and the Amstel river as it flows from the south. The bridge provides access to new Plan Zuid neighborhood from the east, but because of its design also serves as a symbolic city gate. It was originally named 'Amstelbrug' but was later renamed 'Berlagebrug' and has acquired national monumental status.

== Jewish population and World War II ==
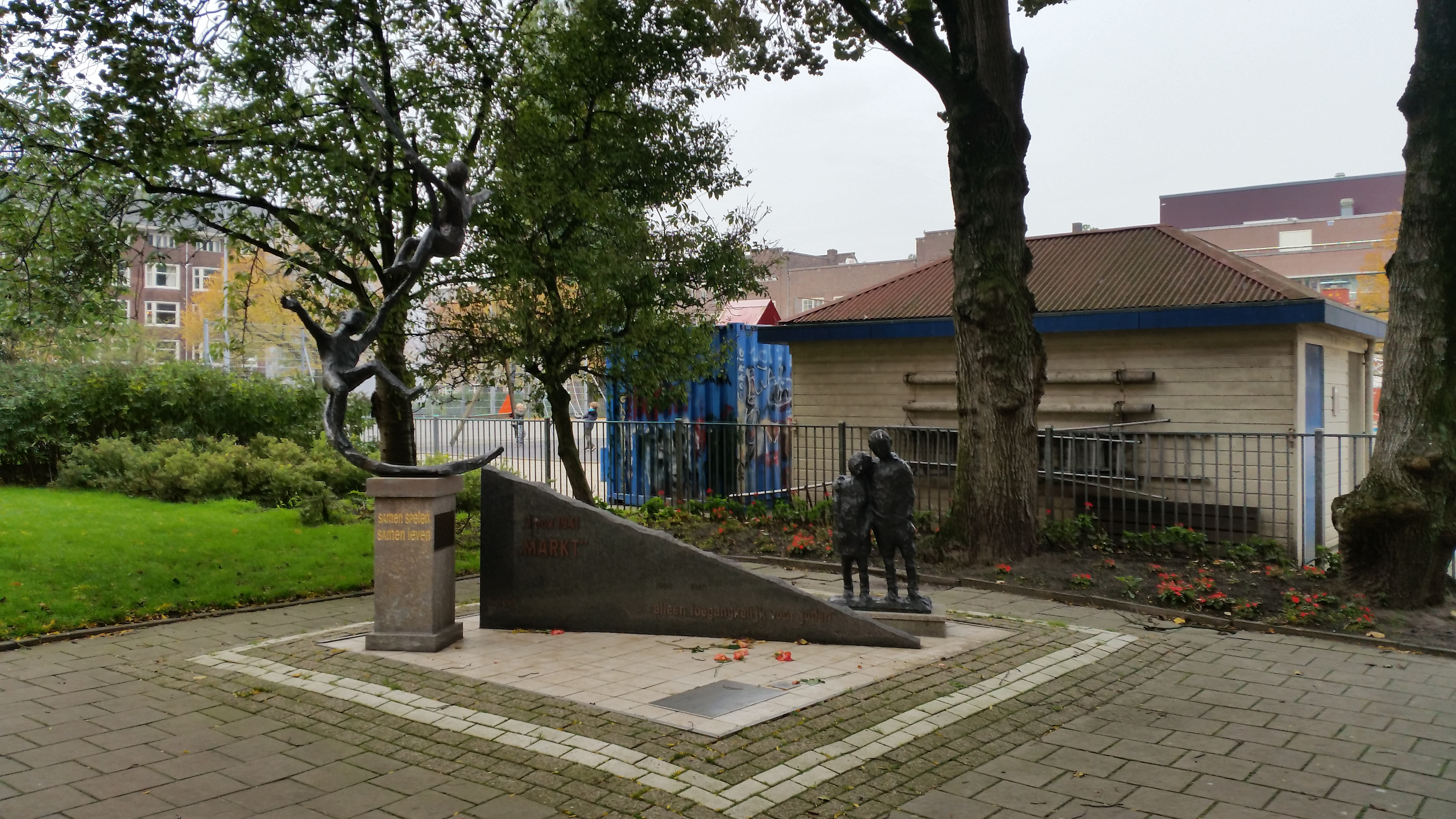
The Kindermonument Markt voor Joden, honoring Jewish children who were banned from using the local playground.

From the 1930s onward, the Jewish population in Rivierenbuurt grew rapidly. The neighborhood was largely populated by middle-class residents, who considered the Rivierenbuurt a step up from the working-class Jodenbuurt (Jewish Neighborhood). The neighborhood also saw an influx of German Jewish refugees fleeing the Nazi regime from 1933 onward. By 1940, about 20% of the Jews in Amsterdam—some 17,000 residents—lived in the Rivierenbuurt. Approximately 13,000 of these would not survive World War II, mostly after being sent to German concentration camps. The most notable Jewish Rivierenbuurt resident was Anne Frank, whose family lived on the Merwedeplein before going into hiding. A statue of Anne stands today in the Merwedeplein park.

The invading Nazi army first entered Amsterdam by the Berlagebrug on May 15, 1940. The playground on Gaaspstraat was at first denied to Jewish children as ordered by the German occupiers, then on November 3, 1941 was converted to a market where Jews were required to shop. After mass deportation of Jewish residents was largely complete, the market was closed on August 9, 1943. A bronze sculpture erected in 1986 honors the Jewish children who were forbidden from using the playground; commemorations occur at the site every year on November 3.

== After World War II ==
Both the invading Nazi army (in 1940) and the liberating Canadian army (in 1945) entered Amsterdam by the Berlagebrug.

Several local place and street names changed after World War II. Daniël Willinkplein became Victorieplein, and the three major avenues that met there (Amstellaan, Noorder Amstellaan and Zuider Amstellaan) were renamed for Stalin, Churchill and Roosevelt respectively. After the Soviet invasion of Hungary in 1956, Stalinlaan was renamed to Vrijheidlaan ('Freedom Lane'). Two additional place names honor American figures from the 20th century: President Kennedylaan (after John F. Kennedy; previously Rivierenlaan) and Martin Luther Kingpark (after Martin Luther King Jr.).

In 1954, the Utrechtsebrug was completed across the Amstel at the south end of the Rivierenbuurt.

With the creation of city districts in 1987, the Rivierenbuurt was designated a standalone district. In 1998, the Rivierenbuurt and Buitenveldert districts merged to form the Zuideramstel district; in 2010, Zuideramstel merged with Oud-Zuid to form the Zuid (South) district.
