= Berlagebrug =

Bridge in Amsterdam

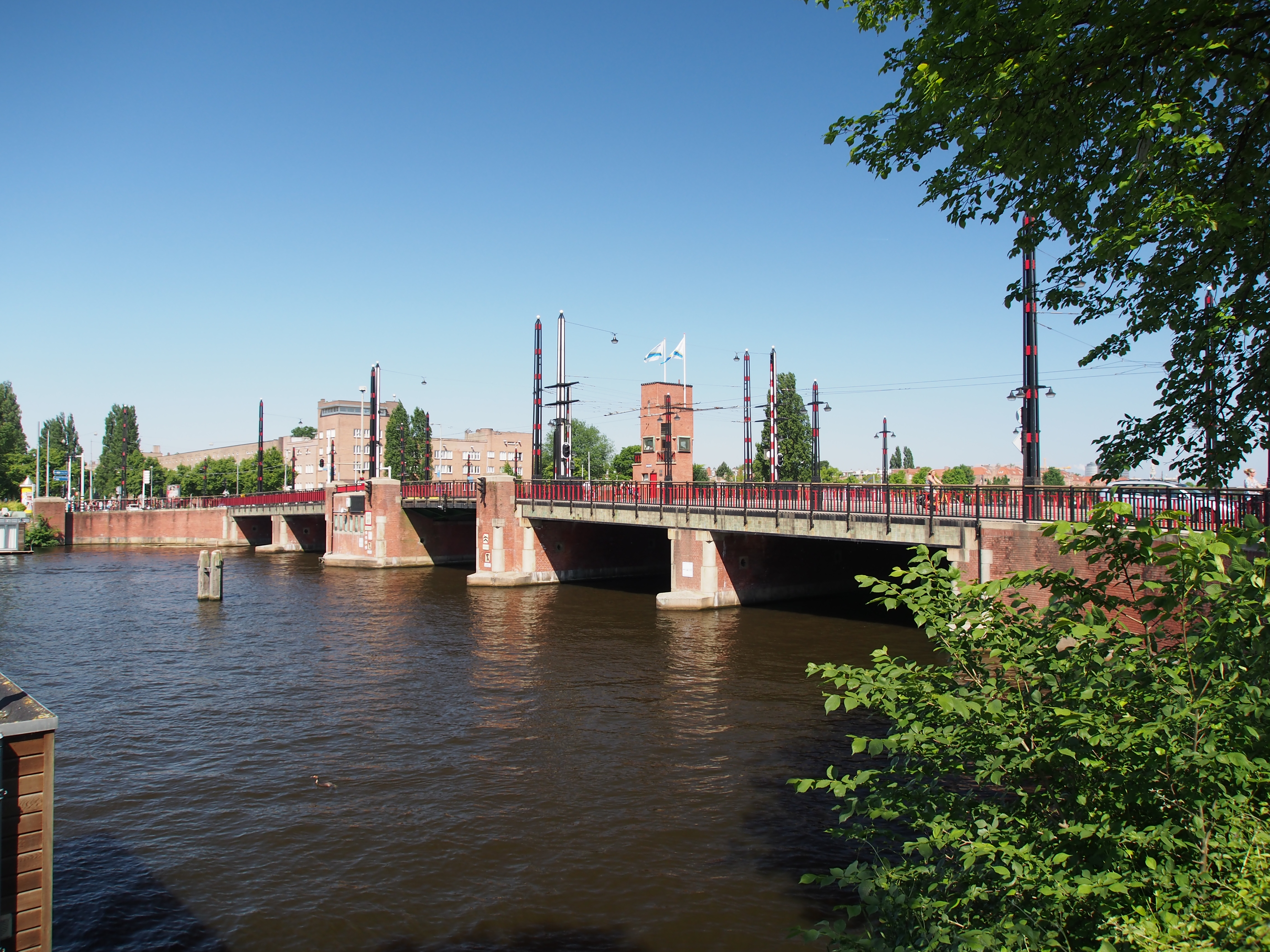
- The bridge in 2016
- Coordinates: 52°20′50″N 4°54′46″E
- Crosses: Amstel
- Locale: Amsterdam, Netherlands
- Named for: Hendrikus Petrus Berlage
- Heritage status: Rijksmonument

Characteristics
- Total length: 100+ m
- Width: 24 m

History
- Architect: H. P. Berlage, C. Biemond
- Construction start: 1926
- Construction end: 1931
- Inaugurated: 28 May 1932

The Berlagebrug (Dutch pronunciation: [ˈbɛrlaːɣəˌbrʏx]; English: Berlage Bridge) is a bascule bridge over the river Amstel in Amsterdam, Netherlands. The bridge was commissioned by the Amsterdam municipality and designed by engineer Cornelis Biemond (1899-1980) and architect Hendrikus Petrus Berlage (1856–1934); it was named after the latter. It was constructed from 1926 to 1931 and officially opened on 28 May 1932. It has been designated as a Rijksmonument (National Heritage Site) since 11 May 2008. The bridgekeeper's house carries the address Amsteldijk 134.

== History ==
=== Background ===
A bridge across the Amstel had been part of Berlage's original plan for Plan Zuid in 1915. In 1925, the main thoroughfare of the new Rivierenbuurt district, the Amstellaan (later renamed Stalinlaan, then renamed again to Vrijheidslaan, in 1956), was completed. The area was not yet directly connected to the eastern part of the city, separated from it by the Amstel. Further need for this bridge was accelerated by the construction of the Transvaalbuurt and Betondorp on the opposite bank of the Amstel. Until the construction of the Berlagebrug, the Nieuwe Amstelbrug (also known as Ceintuurbaanbrug) further north was the closest crossing. In 1911, the Zuidergasfabriek operated their own ferry farther south of the Amstellaan, which became a municipal service in 1927.

=== Design ===
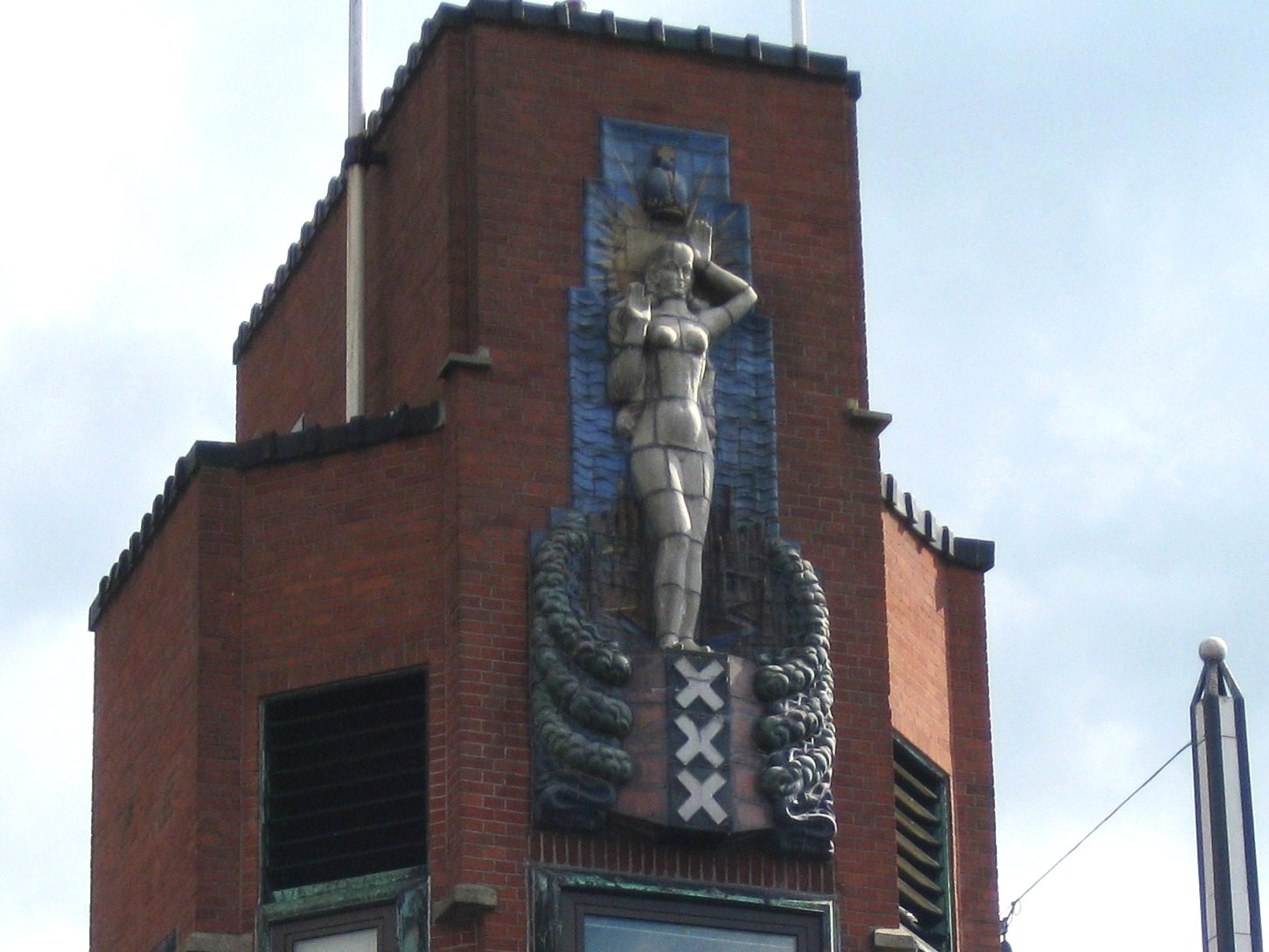
Genius van Amsterdam, design by Hildo Krop.

Two separate elements had to be considered: the aesthetic architectural design and the technical engineering, at a time when there was significant discussion about the combination of the two disciplines, architecture and engineering, in the building of public works. Initially architect Piet Kramer, one of the most prominent members of the Amsterdam School, was under consideration; he had a wealth of experience designing bridges and other buildings for the city. However, there was very public criticism of Kramer and his methods, with one architect, Hans Mieras, publishing an article that argued that two parties (an architect and an engineer) could never achieve the "purity" of a design by a single person. Mieras denounced Kramer and his "fantastical" designs which, he said, "could never contribute to enduring beauty in an environment". When Berlage was asked to design the bridge, however, he gladly worked with an engineer in the same way that Kramer would have. In addition there was dissatisfaction for Kramer's previous work in the Amsterdam School style of architecture, and the design of the bridge was a reward for Berlage's architectural contributions to the city. Berlage was initially joined by Wichert Arend de Graaf of the Municipal Works, then later by Cornelis Biemond, lead designer on bridges at the Municipal Works.

The team was confronted with three main design challenges: the Amstel could not be closed to ship traffic during construction; the span was 100 meters; and there was a considerable difference in height between the raised neighbourhoods of the Western river bank and the lower levels on the eastern river bank. The bridge was designed as a bascule bridge, to allow both electric tram traffic and tall ships to cross (though the tram tracks were not taken into service until 1939). Construction costs were estimated at 1.6 million Dutch guilders, but at that time it was already unlikely to be completed by 1928.

The banks on either side were integrated into the design, with boathouses on the Weesperzijde (east) and a marina on the Amsteldijk (west). The control tower (placed eccentrically) and the bridgekeeper's house had been designed as round buildings, but this was changed to rectangular. The boathouses on the east side (which were built after World War II) end at the Schollenbrug, which was part of the design and is listed with the Berlagebrug as the Rijksmonument. Sculptor Hildo Krop was contracted to provide ornamentation for the bridge; his glazed earthenware relief of the Genius van Amsterdam (the city's protective spirit) was placed on the west side of the bridge's control tower in 1932. The relief was made by a firm in Delft, De Koninklijke Porceleyne Fles. The figure stands on top of three green bands which symbolize the city's Grachtengordel and come together in the city's banner. The middle of the bridge's five spans is the bascule bridge. Berlage used red bricks from Limburg, alternated with yellow granite from Bavaria. Green glazed stone was used as well, and the wrought iron railings were painted black and red, as were the light posts and the electricity poles for the streetcars.

Though the design was complete by 1928, unfavourable soil conditions prevented construction to begin immediately. In 1929, the soil was strengthened on the western bank, with the eastern bank following soon after. When construction began, a small sand deposit site in between the Berlagebrug site and Schollenbrug saw some popularity with Amsterdam residents as an urban beach.

== Opening and use ==
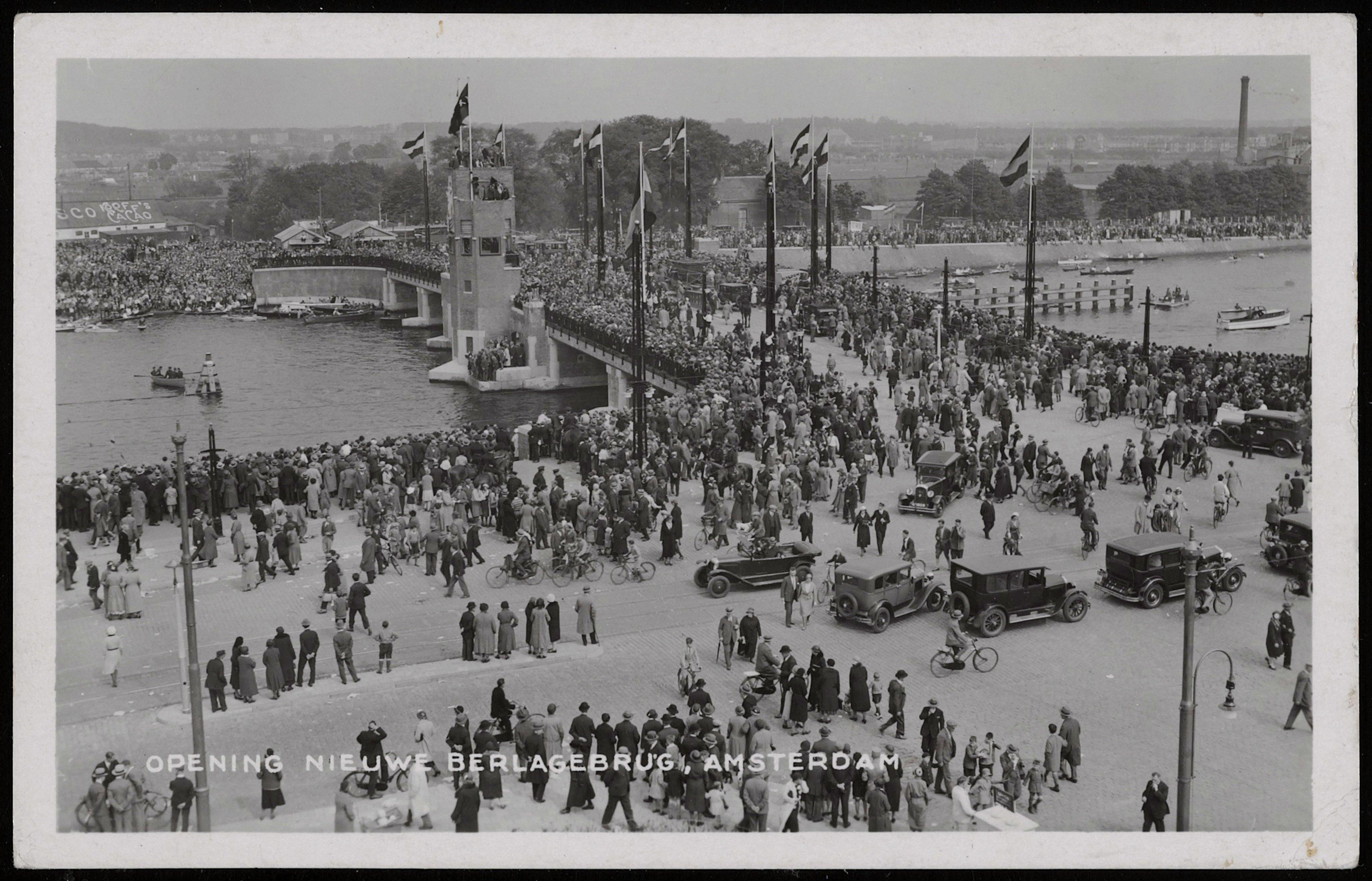
Opening of the bridge, 28 May 1932

On 28 May 1932, the Berlagebrug was formally opened; mayor Willem de Vlugt spoke during the ceremony:

Though she may have been completed during times of depression, she stands there as a sign that Amsterdam does not shirk its duties. Even in trying times, we remain faithful to our people's noble tradition of completing the job we started.

At the time of the opening, the bridge, on the east side, connected only to the Weesperzijde street. Still, immediately after opening, there was noticeably less traffic on the nearby Amstelbrug, and this had been one of the goals. On 15 October 1939 the connection to the Mr. Treublaan was opened, cementing the bridge's use in connecting the Rivierenbuurt and the Amstel railway station.

At the start and finish of World War II in the Netherlands, the Berlagebrug was the entrance into Amsterdam for foreign troops. On 15 May 1940, German troops arrived and were greeted on the Berlagebrug by Reichsdeutsche and Dutch fascists (members of the National Socialist Movement in the Netherlands). On 8 May 1945, Canadian liberators entered the city via the same bridge.
