= Hildo Krop =

Dutch sculptor and furniture designer

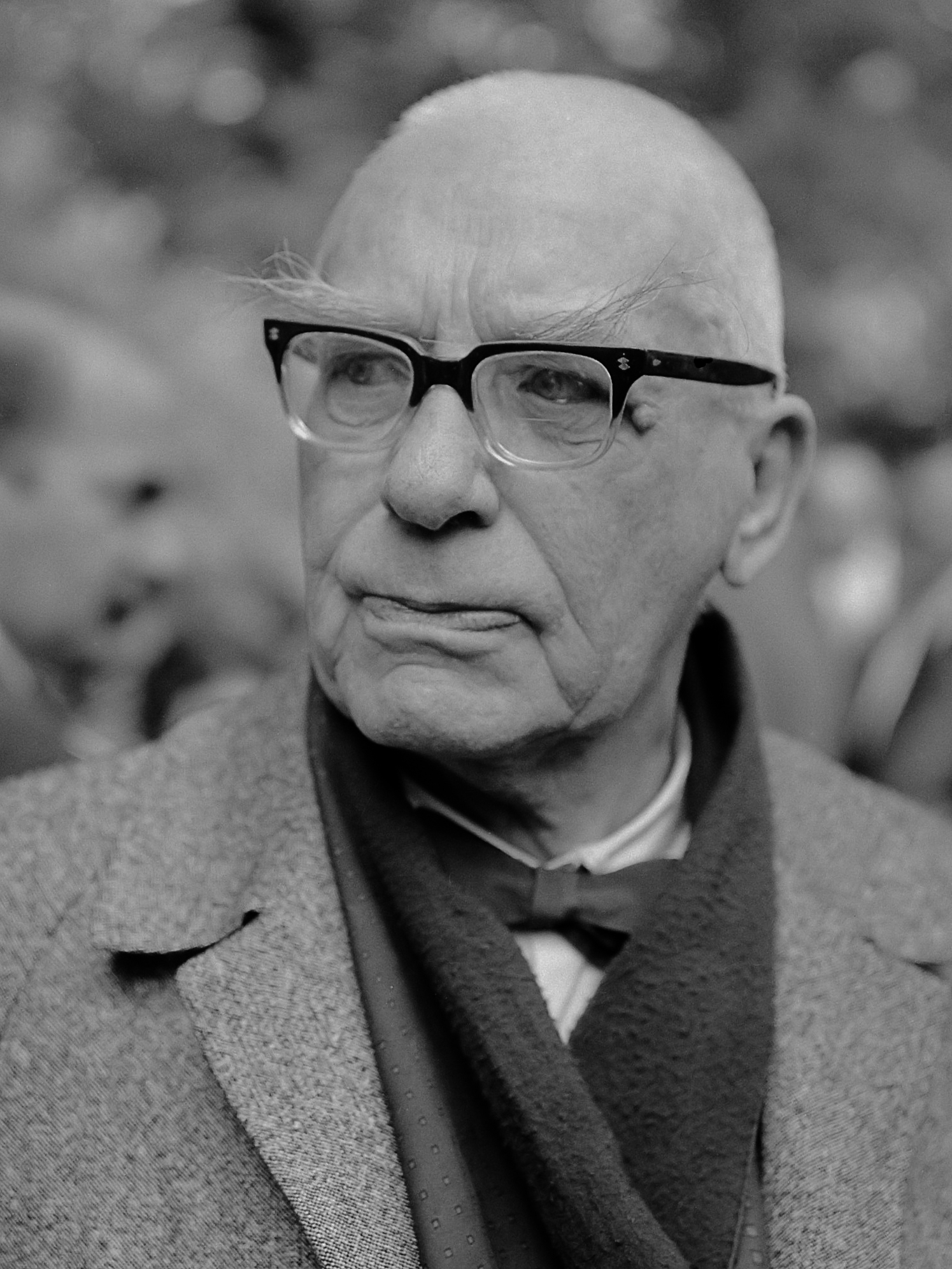
Hildo Krop (1964)

Hildebrand Lucien (Hildo) Krop (26 February 1884, Steenwijk, Overijssel – 20 August 1970) was a prolific Dutch sculptor and furniture designer, widely known as the city sculptor of Amsterdam, where his work is well represented.

== Life ==
Krop was a baker's son. Unwilling to work with an older brother, he set off on his own. In Leiden, he took modeling classes to make marzipan figures. He also worked in France and Italy and as a pastry cook.

=== Arts ===
By 1906, Krop was in England, employed by a couple as a cook. He discovered his talent as a draftsman and attended summer school in art. Back in the Netherlands, he decided to become an artist and went to Paris, where he studied at the Académie Julian. In 1908, he studied at the Rijksakademie in Amsterdam. From sculptor John Rädecker he learned stone carving under Bart van Hove. In 1910, he taught at the HBS (High school) in Haarlem. In 1911–1912, he spent the winter in Berlin, where he studied art under Georg Kolbe and then traveled from Rome to Paris, where he lived with the painter Jacob Bendien and met the sculptor Ossip Zadkine. With Zadkine he practised sculpture and direct carving in a group called 'En taille directe'. At the end of 1912, he returned to Amsterdam where he learned wood carving in the furniture company of A.M. Stoltz.

After several small jobs, Krop worked with Joop van Lunteren and Anton Rädecker as an assistant in the studio of Hendrik van den Eijnde, 1913 – 1916. In 1914 he married Mien Sleef and he moved to Plantage Muidergracht, where he opened his studio. In 1916, he became a staff member of the Amsterdam Department of Public Works. He created two groups of dockworkers in granite for a 1916 Public Works project. His work appears integrated with many civic buildings and bridges of the time. For instance, he designed exterior figures on the Scheepvaarthuis by Amsterdam School architects Johan van der Mey, Piet Kramer and Michel de Klerk are his. After this building, Krop received appointment as city sculptor. Krop's work was included in the 1939 exhibition and sale Onze Kunst van Heden (Our Art of Today) at the Rijksmuseum in Amsterdam.

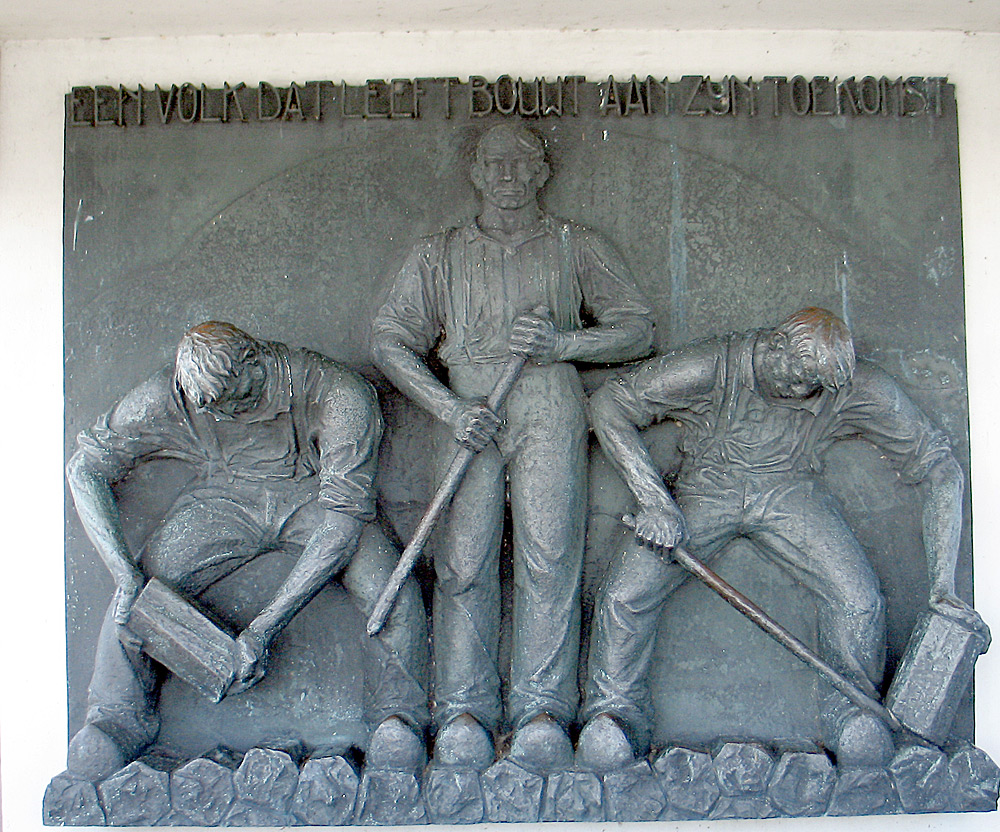
Afsluitdijk monument, 1940. Legend: "A nation that lives builds for the future"

He was responsible for sculptures on many bridges and houses in Amsterdam. These include the Hendrik Berlage monument on Victory Square and the plaque at the monument on the Afsluitdijk. In The Hague, he designed the war memorial at Nassau Square. The art nouveau villa Rams Woerthe in Steenwijk has rooms that feature a varied collection of his work. Hildo Krop also designed furniture, ceramics (ESKAF), glass and ironworks.

Krop was active through 1967. He was buried in Zorgvlied.

=== Politics ===
Krop became a member of the Social Democratic Labour Party in 1908, but out of enthusiasm for the October Revolution and disappointment with social-democratic support for World War I (specifically, an advertisement for German war bonds in Het Volk) he switched allegiances to communism. In 1921, he designed the cover for Henriette Roland Holst's book Soviet Russia. In 1931, he made a bust of Lenin. In 1932, he traveled to the Soviet Union and stayed three months.

Krop also cooperated with Soviet intelligence agents. His first spymaster was Max Friedman. Through him, he came to know "Ludwik" (Ignace Reiss). In June 1937, he drew a study of Reiss on the back of a menu for a later bust.

=== Family ===
Krop was the son of Henry Krop, baker, and Johanna Louisa Cordes. He had two brothers and four sisters.

Krop married Frederika Willemina ("Mien") Sleef on 24 December 1914. They had two children, a daughter and a son. A third child (son) died young. His father-in-law J. W. Sleef was a typographer, a prominent member of the Dutch socialist party and sometime chairman of the Amsterdam section of the socialist SDAP party. Through this family connection, Krop came into contact with leftist organizations and thought.

== Works in Amsterdam ==
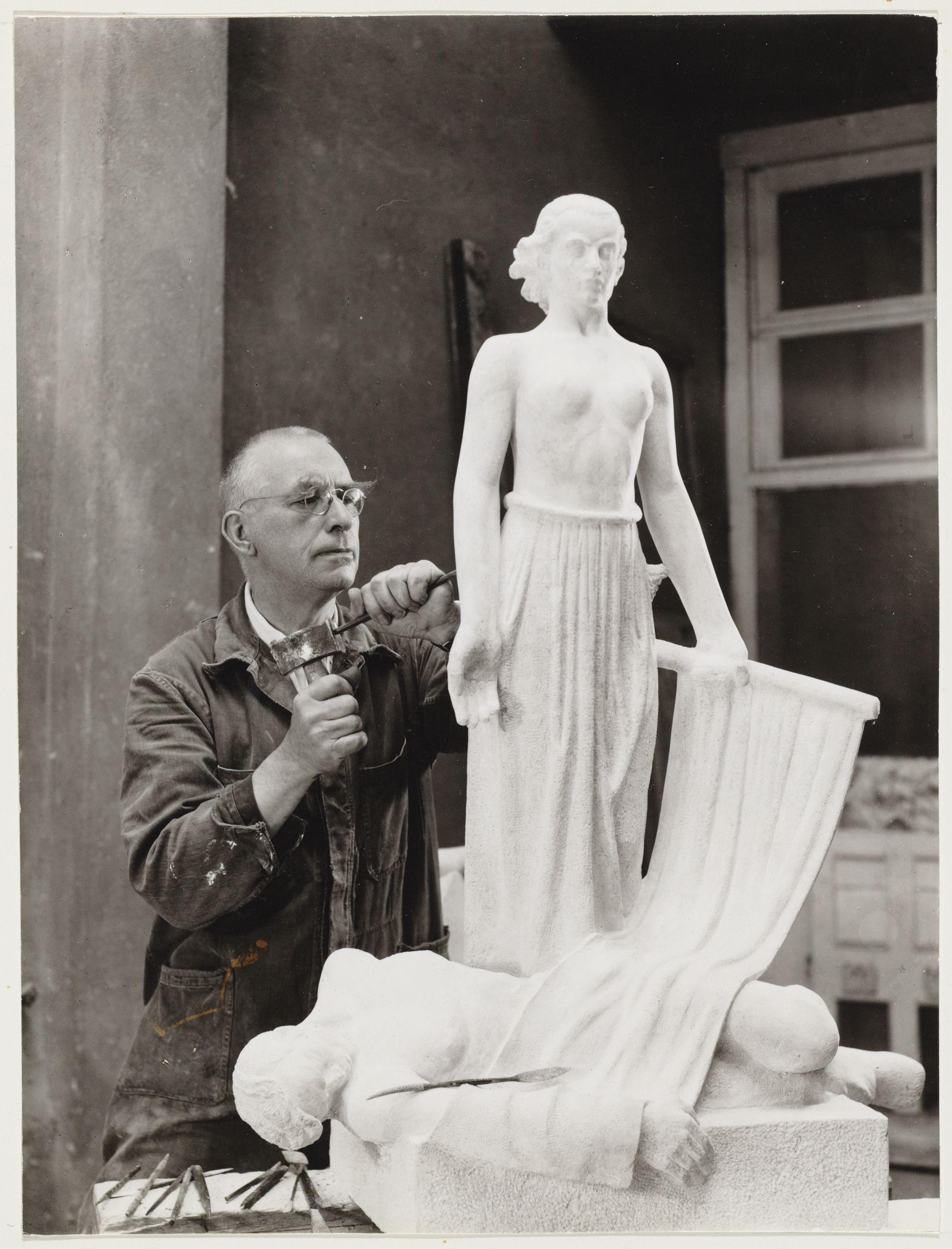
Hildo Krop (1947)

- Mercurius en de windstreken (1916–18), Telefoondienst, Herengracht (Kamerlingh Onneslaan)
- Grave of Albert Hahn (1918–19), Nieuwe Oosterbegraafplaats
- De geboorte van de daad (1921–24), Berlage Lyceum Jozef Israëlskade
- Menselijke energie (1921–24), Berlage Lyceum Jozef Israëlskade
- Overvloed and Verkeer (1922), viaduct Spaarndammerstraat/Westerpark/Nassauplein
- Faun (1924–25), bridge Raadhuisstraat/Keizersgracht
- Verkeer (1926), hout relief, tram depot Lekstraat
- Moeder Aarde (1926), Weteringplantsoen
- De onbevangenheid tegenover het leven (1929–32), Muzenplein
- Lezende jongen ('Geschiedenis') (1929), school Deurloostraat/Geulstraat
- Stedemaagd (1933), Ceramic relief, Berlagebrug
- Nieuw leven/Handen van de Schepper (1939–40), brug Bernard Zweerskade/Beethovenstraat
- Gedenksteen Hongerwinter (1945), Oosterkerk
- Monument gefusilleerden (1947), Marnixstraat
- Monument Henri Viotta (1948), Wagnerstraat
- Fortuna (1948), Muntplein
- Verzetsmonument (1948), Nieuwe Oosterbegraafplaats
- De beschermer en handhaver van de sociale wetgeving (1954), Rijksverzekeringsbank/Apollo House, Apollolaan/Stadionweg
- Nimf/Baadster (1954–56), Marnixbad
- Baruch Spinoza (1959), Spinozalyceum
- Monument joodse grossiers (1959), Centrale Markthallen
- Zeevaart, handel, recht (1966–67), cement reliefs Universiteitsbibliotheek Amsterdam, Singel
- Monument H.P. Berlage (1966), Victorieplein
- Europa, 1953

== Other works ==
- Relief Monument Afsluitdijk, 1940
- Reliefs (1917–1938) and copies in 1957 (sandstone) of the cement works of François Gos and Firmin de Smet, Belgenmonument (Amersfoort) at Amersfoortse Berg
- Drang naar het leven, Openluchtmuseum voor beeldhouwkunst Middelheim, Antwerp 1949–51
- Tile tableaus of Gerechtsgebouw Breda in Breda
- Ontmoeting tussen water en land, sluice gates Eems Canal, Delfzijl
- nl:Simon van Leeuwen (1938), Hoge Raad, The Hague
- Monument omgekomen PTT-ers (1950)
- Buste Erasmus (1950), near St.Janskerk, Gouda
- Oorlogsmonument (1949), De La Sablonièrekade, Kampen
- Monument Pieter Jelles Troelstra (1961–62), Oldehoofsterkerkhof, Leeuwarden
- Theo van Welderen Rengers (1955), Vrouwenpoort/Westerplantage, Leeuwarden
- Gevelversiering van een adelaar met een nest jongen in een omgekeerde Mercuriushelm (1920), Zeezicht Zalencentrum at the corner of Nobelstraat/Keizerstraat formerly a bank, Utrecht
- Ornaments at the entrance of the housing complex "De Utrecht" (1923), Jan van Scorelstraat (Oudwijk) Utrecht
