= Harry Elte =

Dutch architect

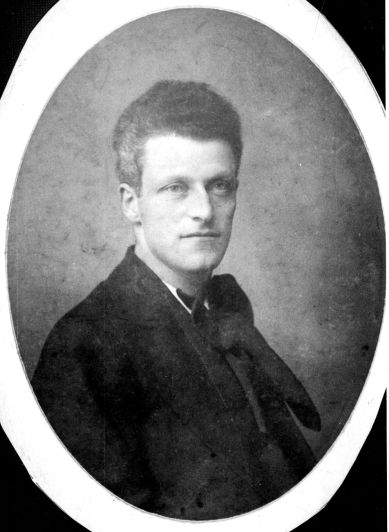
Harry Elte at a young age.

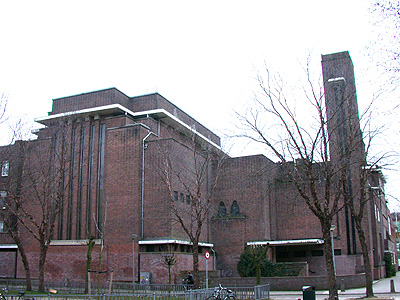
Amsterdam: Raw Aron Schuster Synagoge

Harry Elte (born with the name Hartog Elte, Amsterdam, 3 September 1880 – Theresienstadt, 1 April 1944) was a Jewish-Dutch architect. His style is that of the Amsterdam School.

Elte was educated by Berlage. He designed several synagogues and villa's in the Netherlands, as well as a football stadium. For his parents, he designed grave stones on the Jewish cemetery of Muiderberg.

During World War II he was deported and died in the Theresienstadt concentration camp.
