= Plan Zuid =

City expansion project of Amsterdam, Netherlands

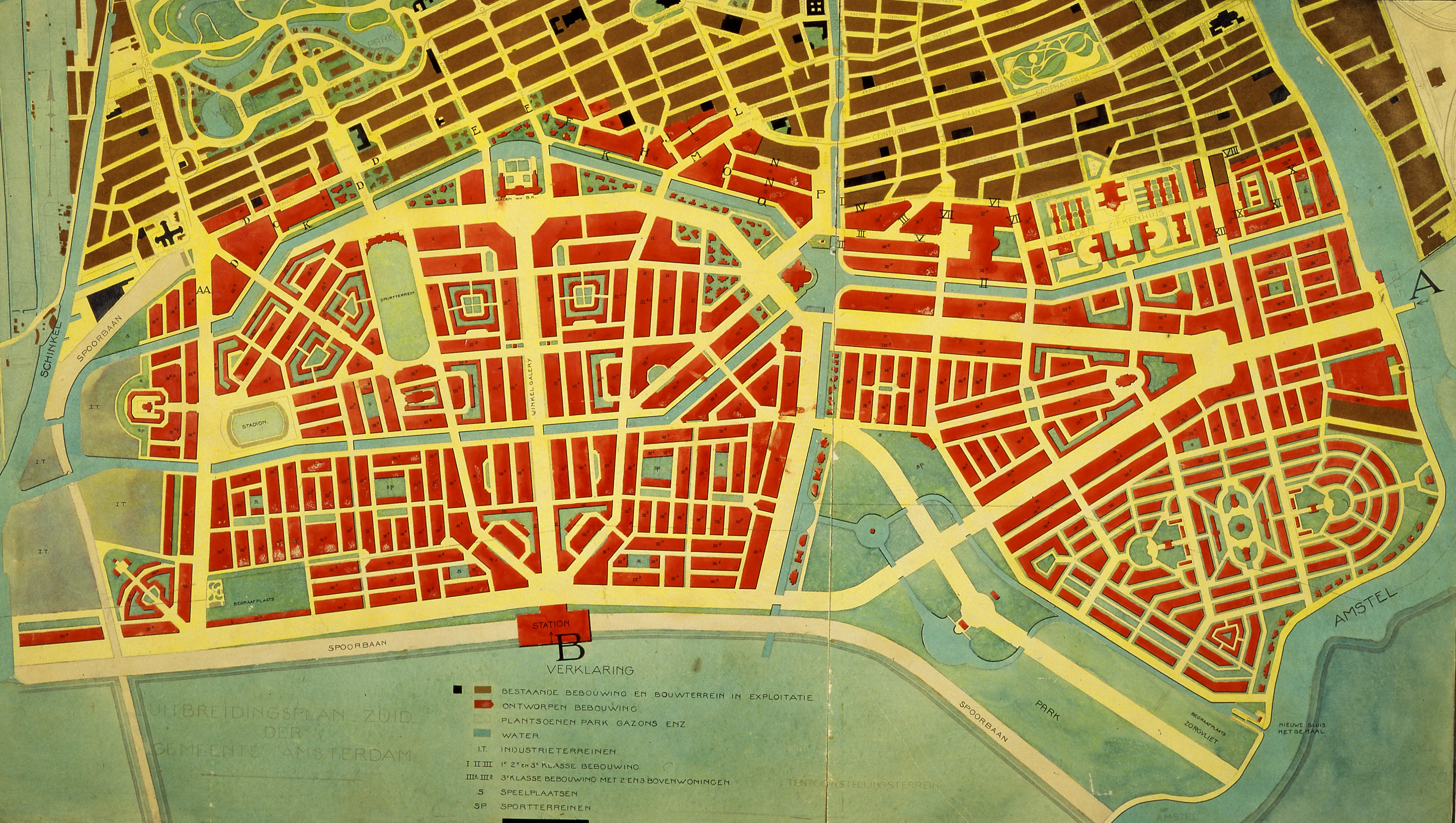
Plan Zuid 1915, authorization by the City Council 1917, (H.P.Berlage)

The Plan Zuid ("South Plan") is an urban development plan of Amsterdam South in the city of Amsterdam, Netherlands, designed by architect Hendrik Petrus Berlage. Berlage was responsible for the urban concept (1915) and the architects of the Amsterdam School (partly expressionist architects) designed the implementation of the plan.

Some years later Berlage was one of the leading architects of a new urban plan in Amsterdam, called Plan West (1922-1927). Here Berlage designed the center of Plan West, the architecture of the Mercatorplein (main square).

== First project ==
At the beginning of the 20th century, Berlage was asked by the Amsterdam city council to design a plan for developing the undeveloped area south of the city between the rivers Amstel and Schinkel. In 1904, Berlage presented an ambitious plan of winding streets, which was closely joined to the existing city. After research showed that this plan would be very costly and inefficient, Berlage was asked to go back to the drawing board.

== Final project ==
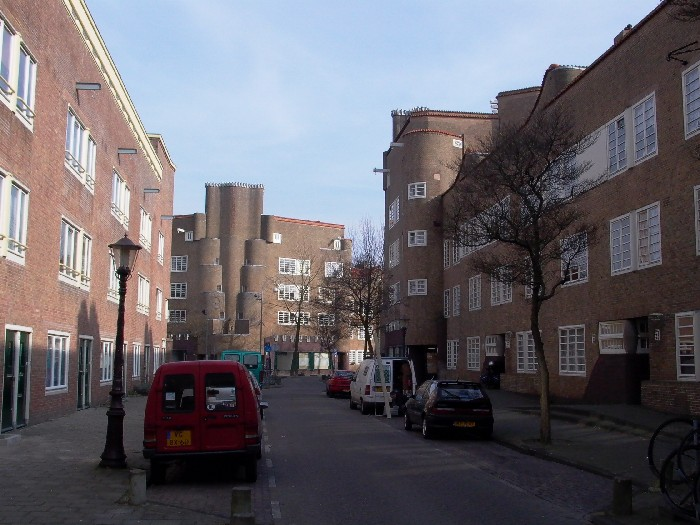
"De Dageraad", part of Plan Zuid, well-known social housing estate, B-Tellegenstraat / PL-Takstraat, 1923 (Piet Kramer, middle) (Michel de Klerk, right)

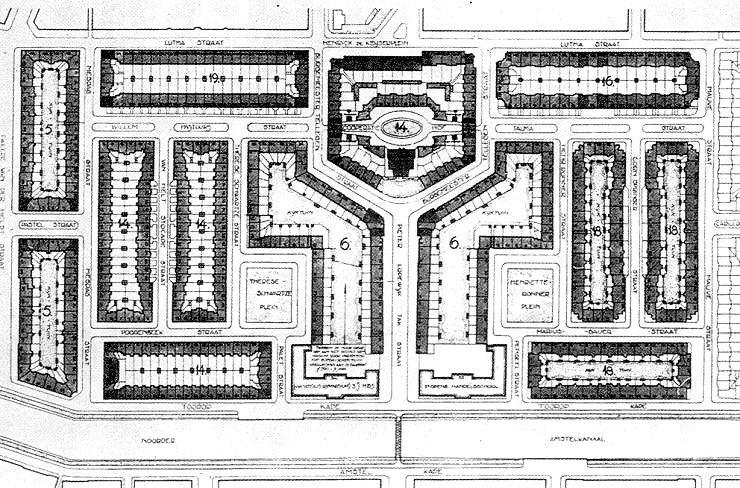
"De Dageraad", situation plan. Street-Y: B-Tellegenstraat (\/) / PL-Takstraat (I)

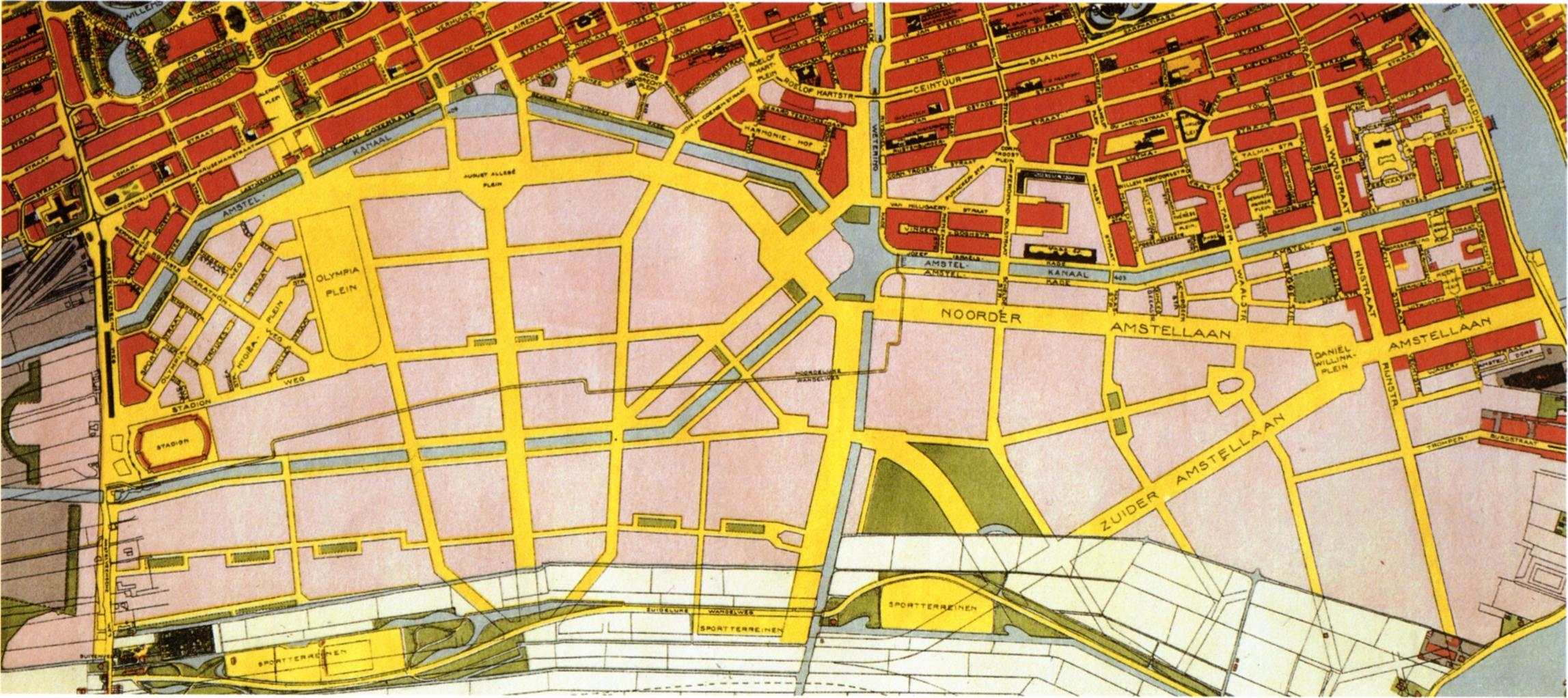
Plan Zuid, urban plan 1915 by H.P.Berlage, state of infills 1922, "De Dageraad" is on the right side

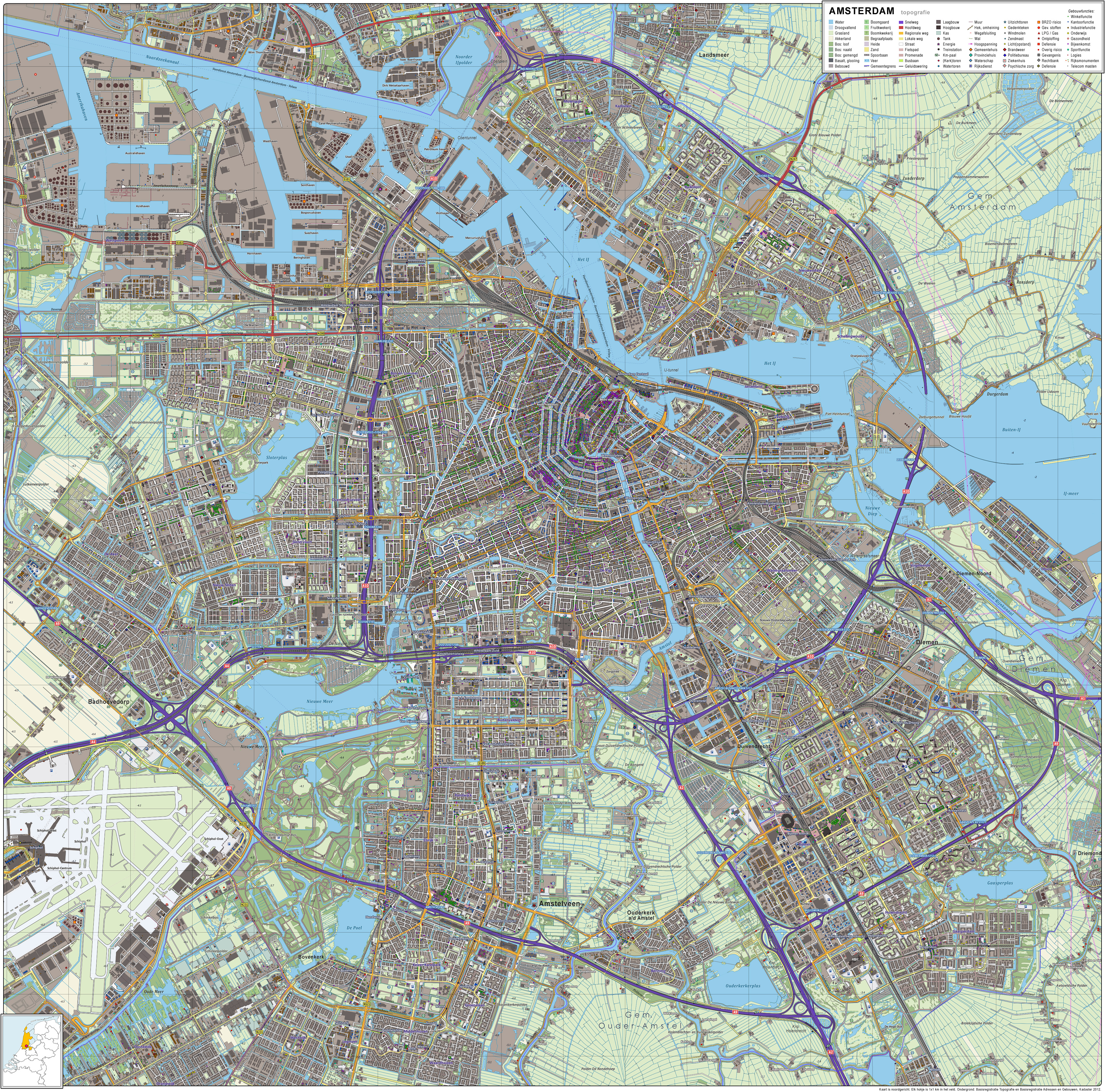
Amsterdam, Plan Zuid (in the middle of the map)

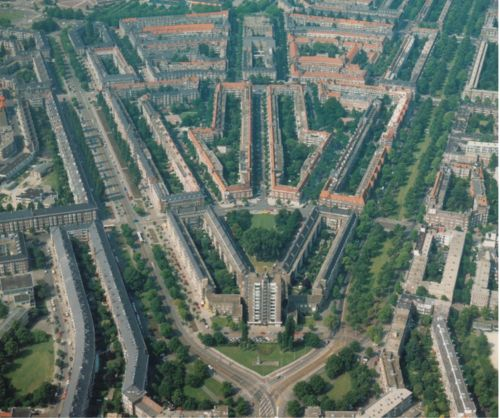
Street-Y: Vrijheidslaan (I), Rooseveltlaan (\), Churchill-laan (/)

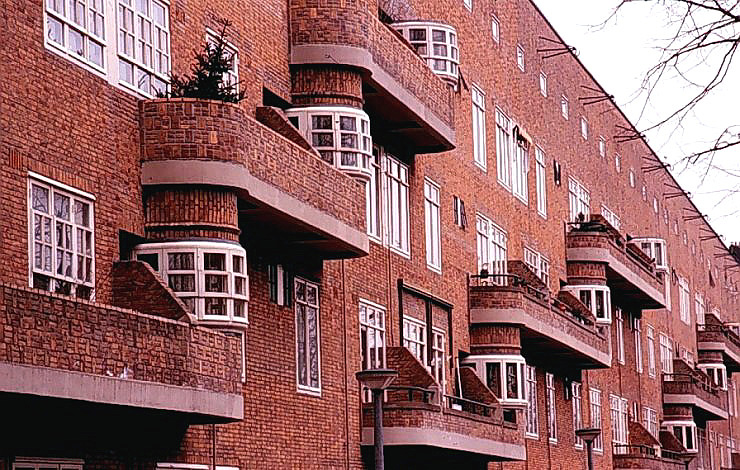
Vrijheidslaan, middle-class housing, 1923 (Michel de Klerk)

Berlage presented a new plan in 1915, with straight narrow streets and long blocks, intersected by several broad axes. This plan proved much more feasible and efficient. In 1917 the City Council granted approval to the plan. The New South district was built in the style of the Amsterdam School between 1917 and 1925, consisting of the Stadionbuurt, Apollobuurt and Rivierenbuurt neighbourhoods. A large part of the Nieuwe Pijp neighbourhood derives from the Plan Zuid.

Berlage's design was only roughly implemented. On the spot where he had planned a teaching hospital, a large housing association designed by Michel de Klerk and Piet Kramer called "De Dageraad" (The Dawn) housing complex was built. It was opened in July 1922 by the alderman festive Housing, SR de Miranda.

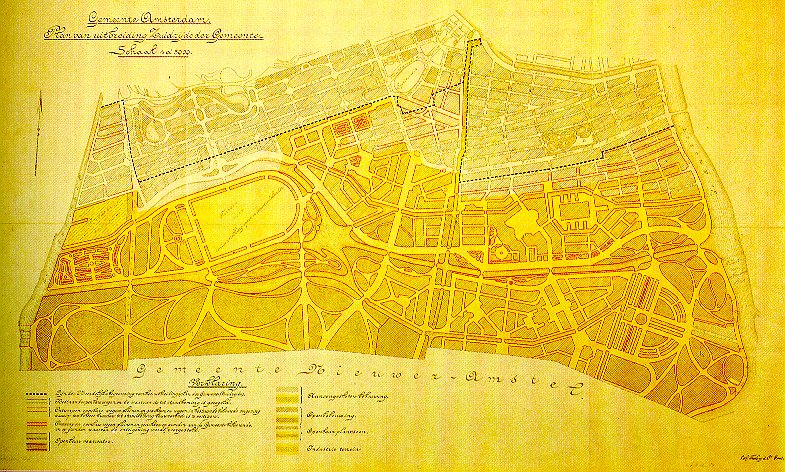
Plan Zuid 1904, urban plan for the south of Amsterdam, (H.P.Berlage)

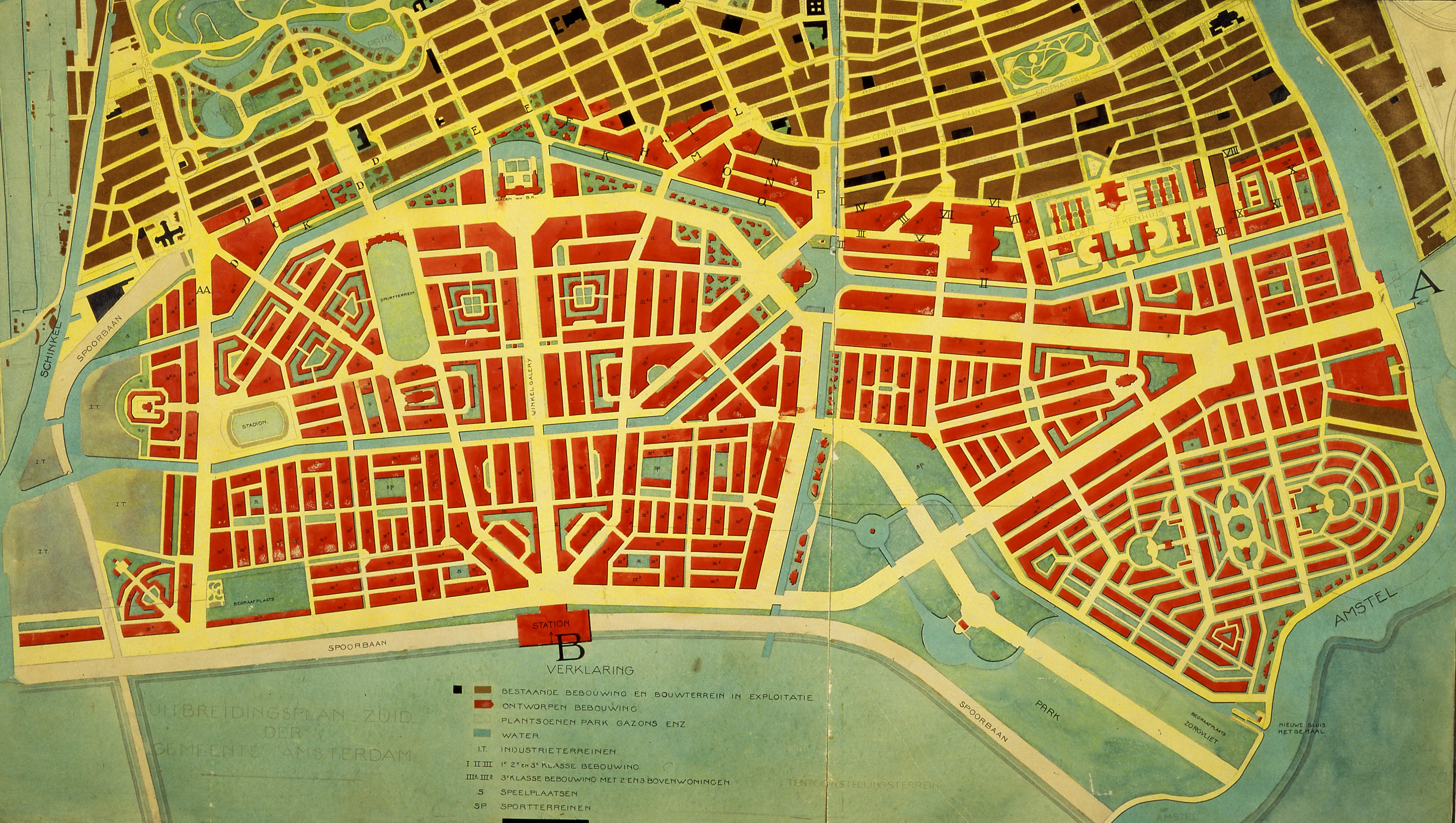
Plan Zuid 1915, authorization by the City Council 1917, (H.P.Berlage)

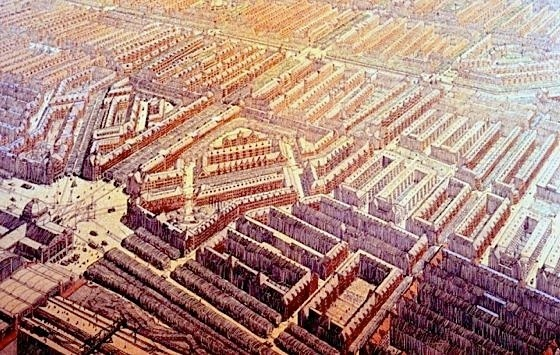
Plan Zuid 1915, air view, Amsterdam Zuid Station

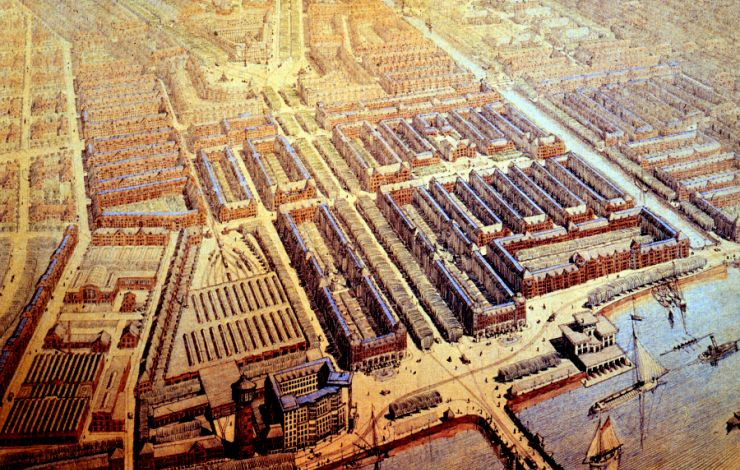
Plan Zuid 1915, air view, Street-Y and river Amstel
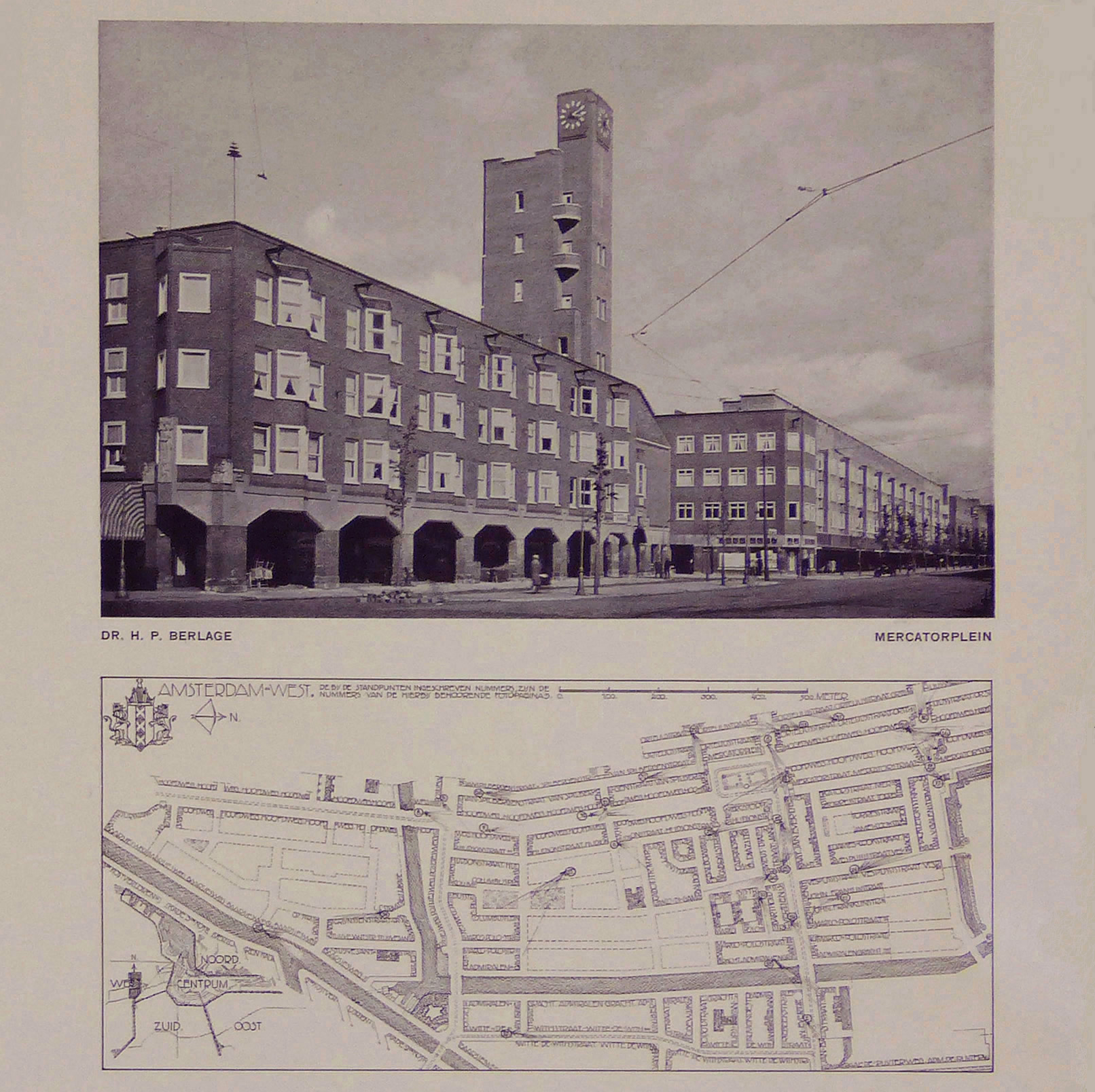
Plan West 1922-1927, architecture of the Mercatorplein, (H.P.Berlage)

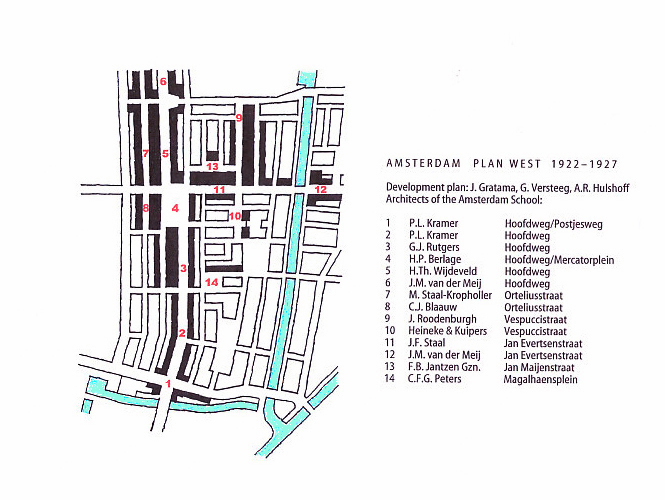
Plan West 1922-1927, Mercatorplein, main square

== Bibliography ==
- Sergio Polano, Hendrik Petrus Berlage, (with essays by Giovanni Fanelli, Jan de Heer, Vincent van Rossum), Phaidon Press London 2002.
- Sigfried Giedion, Space, Time and Architecture, (part Amsterdam Urban Planning 1900-1930), Harvard University Press Cambridge Mass. 2009.
- Vladimir Stissi, Amsterdam, het mekka van de volkshuisvesting 1909-1942 (Amsterdam, the Mecca of Social Housing 1909-1942), Dutch edition, 500 ill., NAi Rotterdam 2007.
