= H. P. Berlage =

Dutch architect (1856–1934)

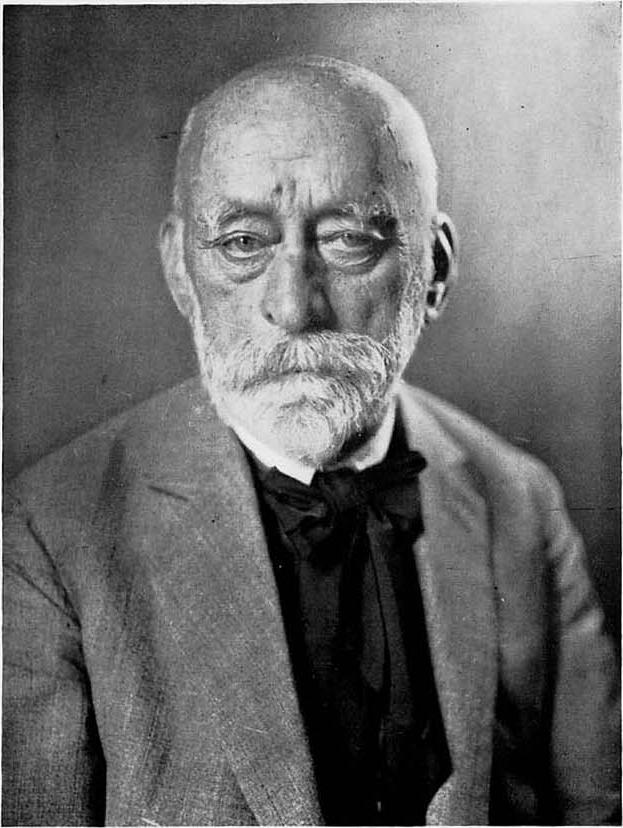
- Born: Hendrik Petrus Berlage; 21 February 1856; Amsterdam, Netherlands
- Died: 12 August 1934 (aged 78); The Hague, Netherlands
- Education: ETH Zurich
- Occupation: Architect
- Buildings: Beurs van Berlage (1903); Jachthuis Sint-Hubertus (1920); Kunstmuseum Den Haag (1935)
- Projects: Plan Zuid (1915)

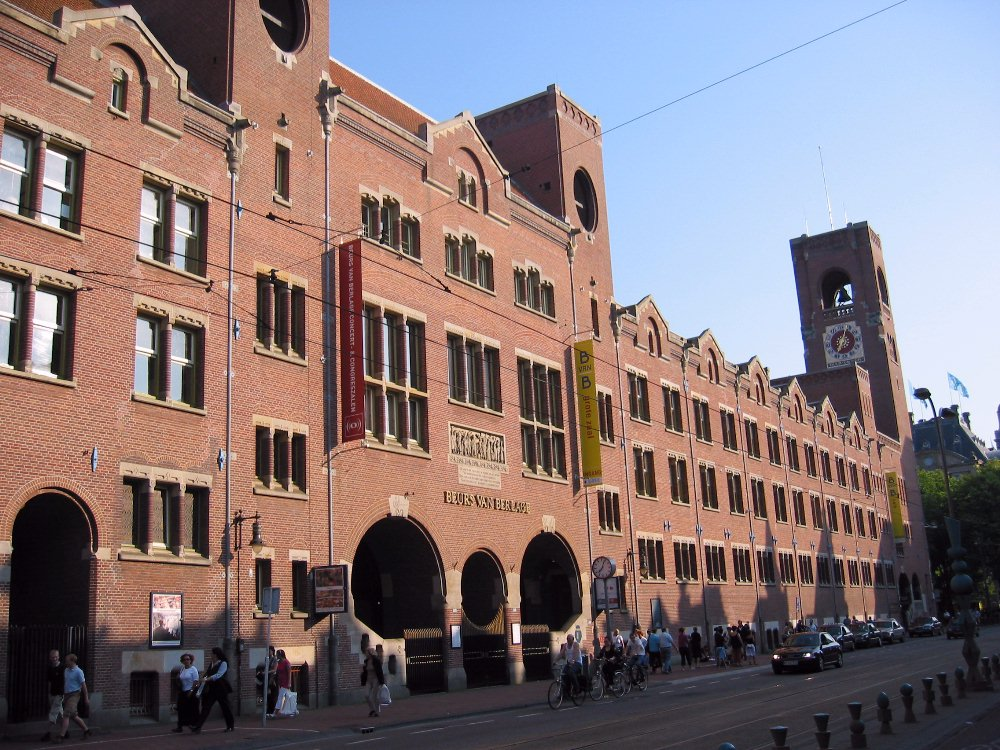
Beurs van Berlage in Amsterdam

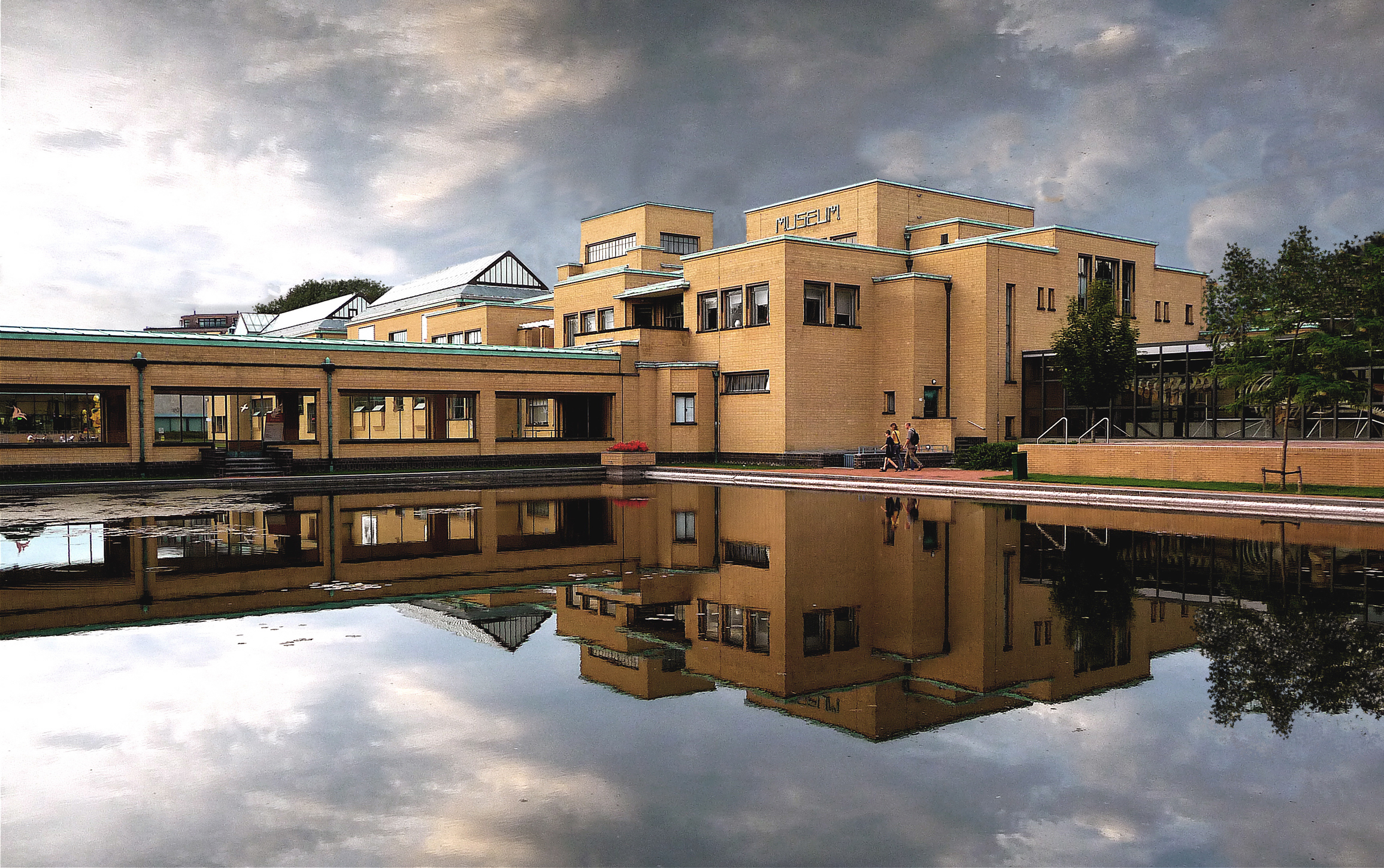
Kunstmuseum Den Haag in The Hague

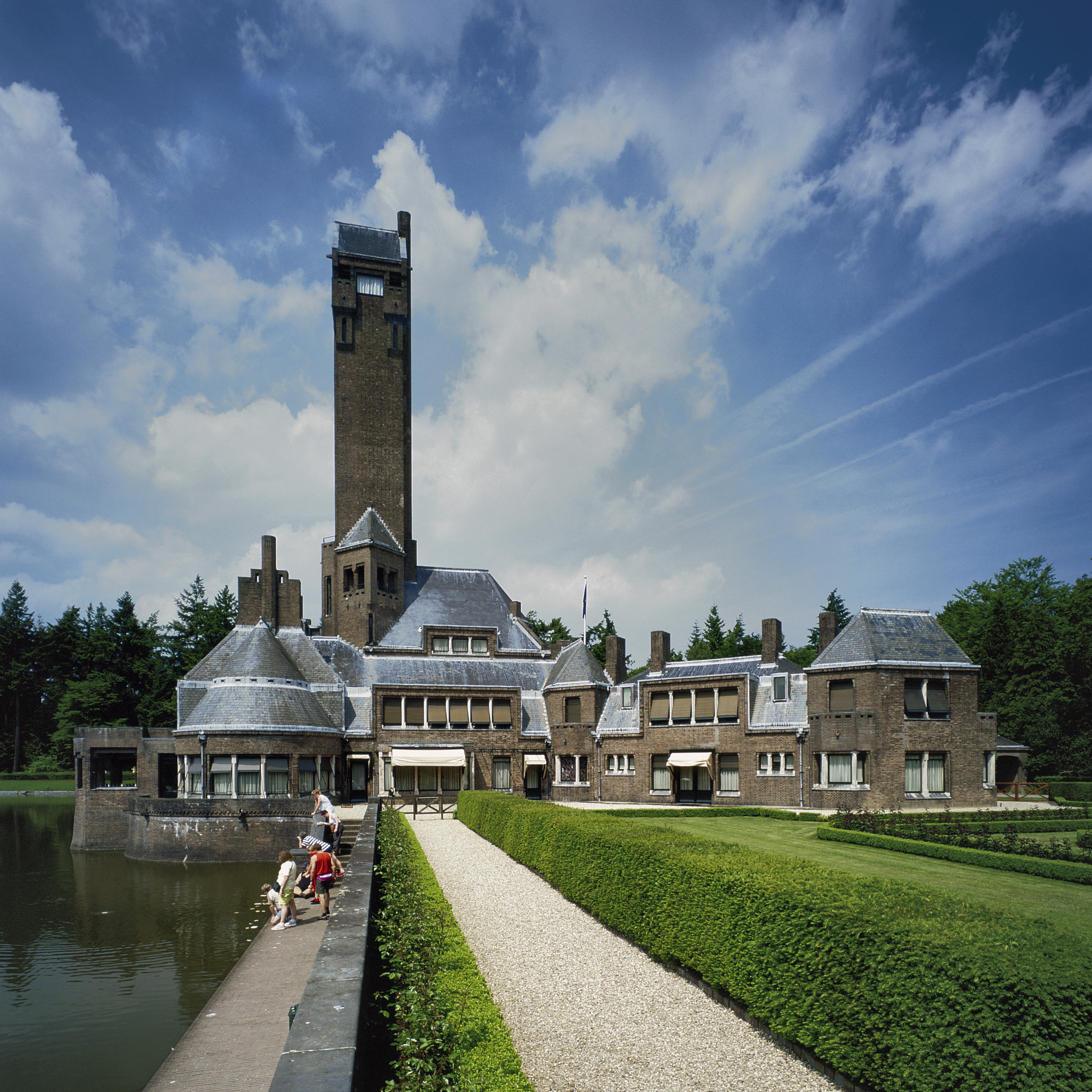
St. Hubertus Hunting Lodge, Hoge Veluwe National Park

Hendrik Petrus Berlage (Dutch pronunciation: [ˈɦɛndrɪk ˈpeːtrʏz ˈbɛrlaːɣə]; 21 February 1856 – 12 August 1934) was a Dutch architect and designer. He is considered one of the fathers of the architecture of the Amsterdam School.

== Life and work ==
Hendrik Petrus Berlage, son of Nicolaas Willem Berlage and Anna Catharina Bosscha, was born on 21 February 1856 in Amsterdam in the Netherlands. Anna Catharina Bosscha's uncle was Johannes Bosscha, a scientist who taught in Polytechnische School te Delft.

Berlage studied architecture at the Zurich Institute of Technology between 1875 and 1878 after which he traveled extensively for three years through Europe. In the 1880s he formed a partnership in the Netherlands with Theodore Sanders which produced a mixture of practical and utopian projects. A published author, Berlage held memberships in various architectural societies including CIAM I.

Berlage was influenced by the Neo-Romanesque brickwork architecture of Henry Hobson Richardson and of the combination of structures of iron seen with brick of the Castle of the Three Geckos of Domènech i Montaner. This influence is visible in his design for the Amsterdam Commodities Exchange, for which he would also draw on the ideas of Viollet-le-Duc. The load-bearing bare brick walls and the notion of the primacy of space, and of walls as the creators of form, would be the constitutive principles of the 'Hollandse Zakelijkheid'.

A visit Berlage made to the U.S. in 1911 greatly affected his architecture. From then on the organic architecture of Frank Lloyd Wright would be a significant influence. Lectures he gave when returned to Europe would help to disseminate Wright's thoughts in Germany.

A notable overseas commission was the 1916 Holland House, built as offices for a Dutch shipping company in Bury Street in the City of London (behind Norman Foster's 30 St Mary Axe of 2003).

Considered the "Father of Modern architecture" in the Netherlands and the intermediary between the Traditionalists and the Modernists, Berlage's theories inspired most Dutch architectural groups of the 1920s, including the Traditionalists, the Amsterdam School, De Stijl and the New Objectivists. He received the British RIBA Royal Gold Medal in 1932.

Berlage died on 12 August 1934 in The Hague. His son, also named Hendrik Petrus Berlage, was an astronomer in Royal Magnetic and Meteorological Observatory in Batavia, Dutch East Indies (now Jakarta, Indonesia), whose name has been immortalized as a lunar crater (Berlage).

== Legacy ==
The Berlage Center for Advanced Studies in Architecture and Urban Design, commonly known as The Berlage and originally founded in 1990, was named in his honor. Since its establishment, the institute has functioned as a postgraduate school for architecture, promoting experimental design, cross-cultural research, and critical discourse in architectural education.

Works of Berlage are in the public collections of Museum de Fundatie, Gemeentemuseum Den Haag, and Kröller-Müller Museum.

== Publications ==
- Hendrik Berlage (1996): Hendrik Petrus Berlage: Thoughts on Style, 1886-1909 (Texts & Documents), The Getty Center For The History Of Art, ISBN 0-89236-334-7
