= Jordaan (disambiguation) =

The Jordaan is a neighbourhood in the city of Amsterdam, Netherlands and part of the borough of Amsterdam-Centrum.

Jordaan may also refer to:

== People ==
=== Given name ===
- Jordaan Brown (born 1992), Jamaican football player
- Jordaan Clarke, part of a key case Clarke v. Oregon Health & Sciences University

=== Surname ===
- Andrew Jordaan (born 1954), South African cricketer
- Arno Jordaan (born 1984), South African Afrikaans singer and songwriter
- Danny Jordaan (born 1951), president of the South African Football Association (SAFA), lecturer, politician and anti-apartheid activist
- Henno Jordaan (born 1988), South African cricketer
- Johnny Jordaan, artistic name for Johannes Hendricus van Musscher (1924–1989), Dutch singer of popular music, in particular the genre known as levenslied
- Kerstin Jordaan, South African mathematician
- Paul Jordaan (born 1992), South African rugby union player
- Theuns Jordaan (1971–2021), South African singer and songwriter

== Other uses ==
- Johnny Jordaan Square (Johnny Jordaanplein) a square in the city of Amsterdam
- Jordaan v Verwey, an important case in the South African law of lease

== See also ==
- Jordan (disambiguation)
