= List of squares in Amsterdam =

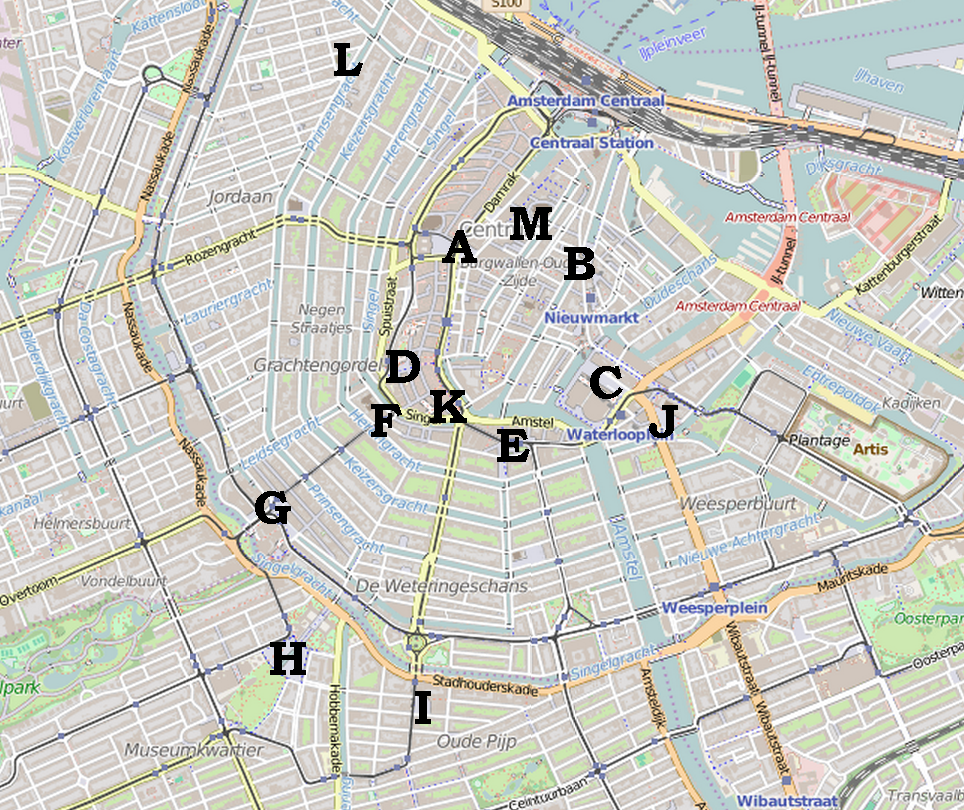

There are over eighty squares or pleins in Amsterdam, Netherlands. This is a list of the most notable ones.

== Major squares ==
=== Dam Square ===
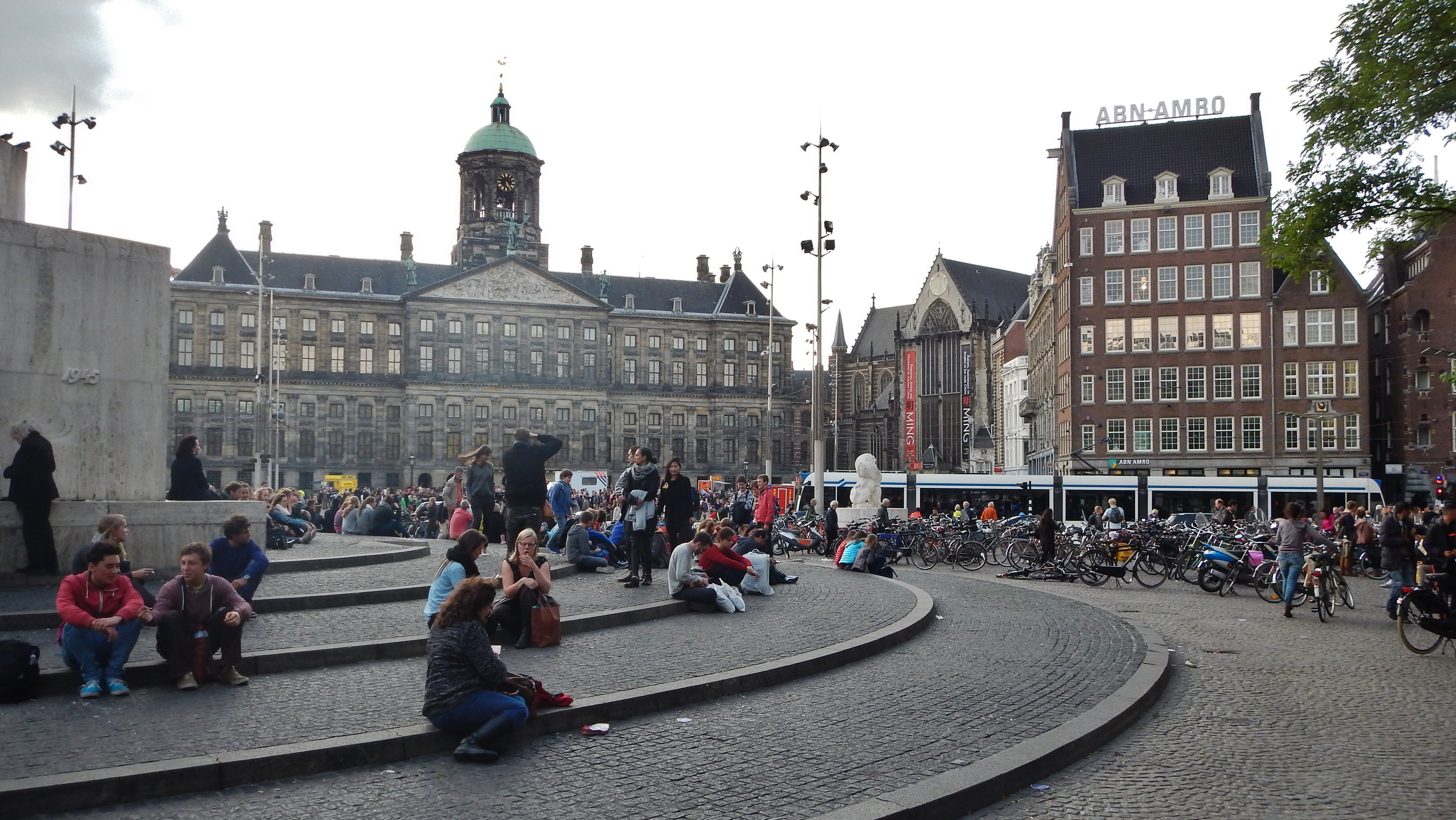
Dam Square

Dam Square, also known as the Dam it is the main town square and considered to be the very center of the city. On the west edge of the square is the Royal Palace. It is roughly rectangular in shape, and stretches about 200 meters from west to east and about 100 meters from north to south. It links the streets Damrak and Rokin, which run along the original course of the Amstel River from Centraal Station to Muntplein (Mint Square) and the Munttoren (Mint Tower). The Dam also marks the endpoint of the other well-traveled streets Nieuwendijk, Kalverstraat and Damstraat. A short distance beyond the northeast corner lies the main red-light district: de Wallen.

The National Monument, a white stone pillar designed by J.J.P. Oud and erected in 1956 to memorialize the victims of World War II, dominates the opposite side of the square. Also overlooking the plaza are the NH Grand Hotel Krasnapolsky and the upscale department store De Bijenkorf. These various attractions have turned the Dam into a tourist zone.

=== Dijkgraafplein ===
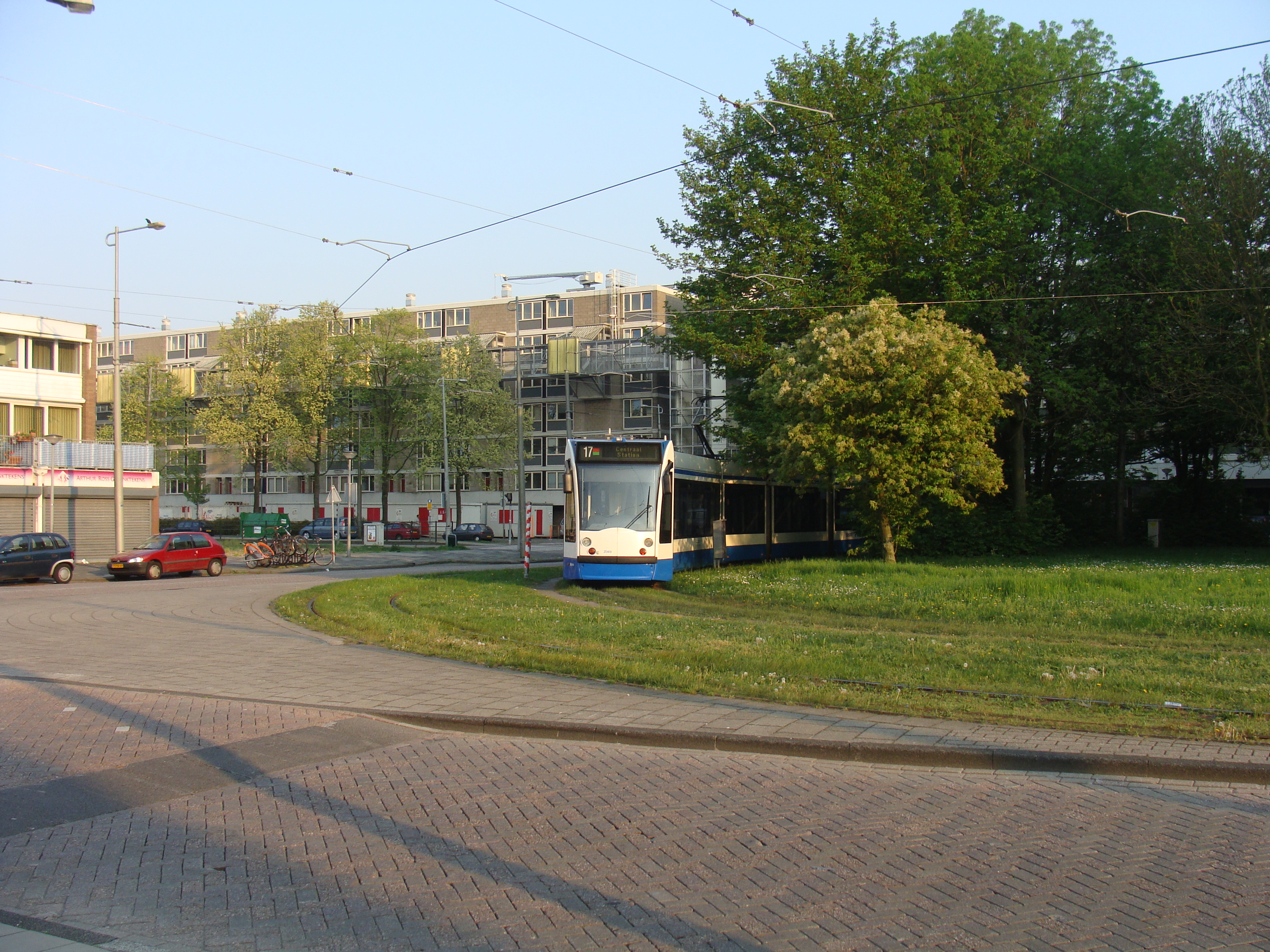
Dijkgraafplein

Dijkgraafplein is located in Amsterdam-Osdorp at the end of Tussen Meer in the neighborhood that is now known as 'De Sharpen'. It is named after the office of dijkgraaf (the chairman of a waterboard) in 1962.

=== Koningsplein ===
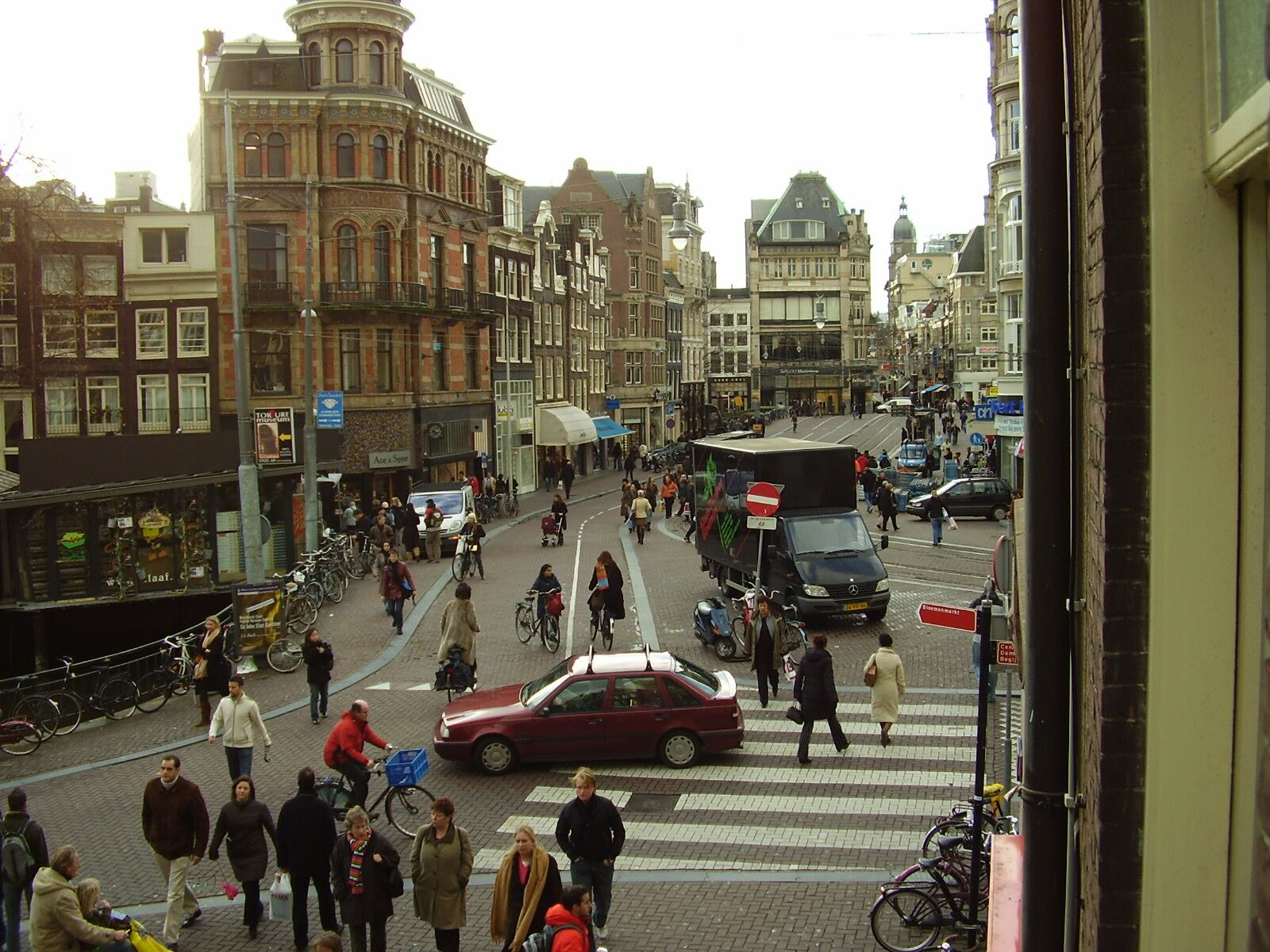
Koningsplein in 2005

Koningsplein is located between the Singel and Herengracht canals. It has become a meeting place for the local community.

=== Leidseplein ===
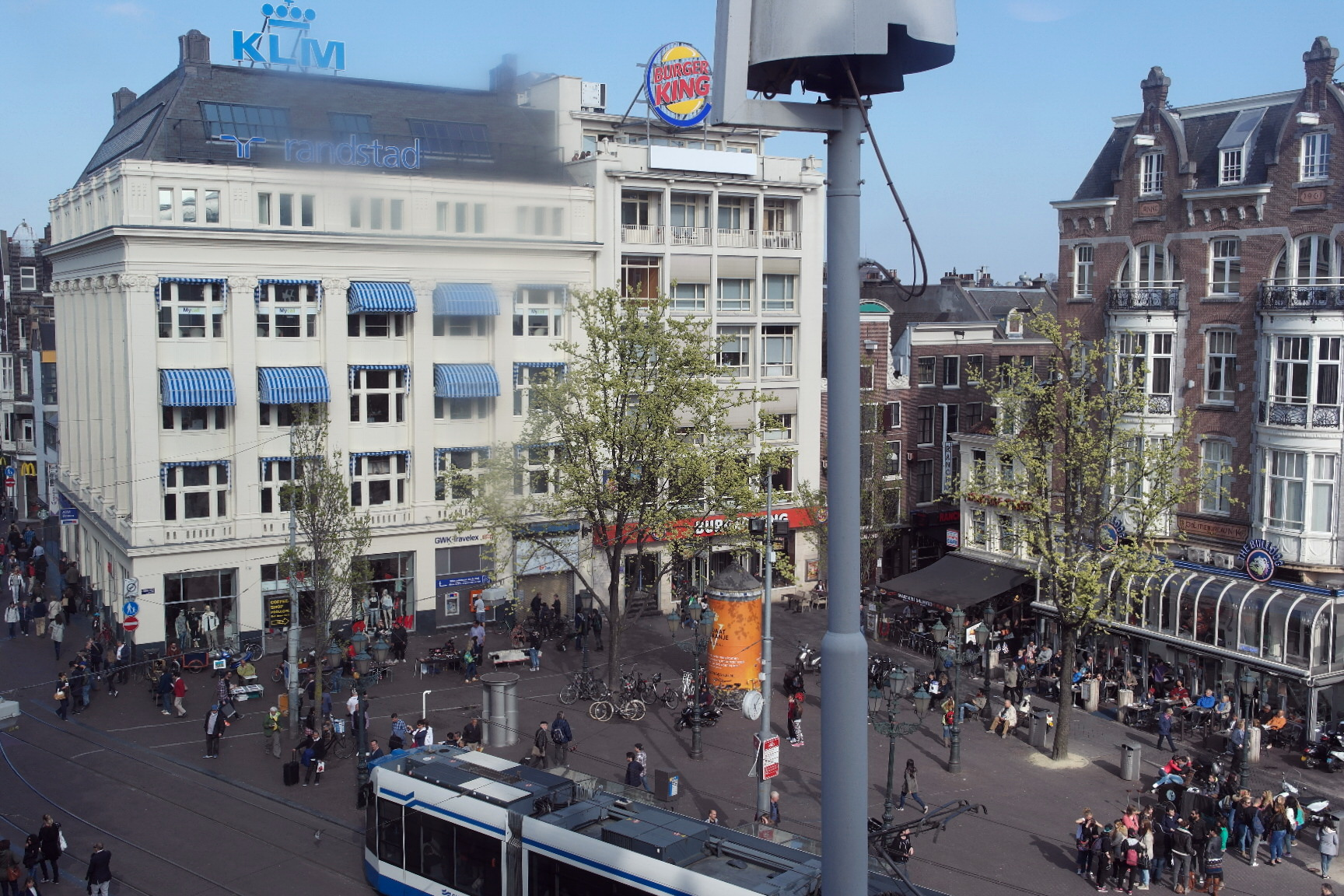
Leidseplein

Leidseplein is located in the southwest of the Grachtengordel district immediately northeast of the Singelgracht canal. It is situated on the crossroads of the Weteringschans, the Marnixstraat, and the Leidsestraat. It is one of the busiest centres for nightlife in the city. Historically, the square was the end of the road from Leiden, and served as a parking lot for horse-drawn traffic. Today, modern traffic travels through the square and side streets are packed with restaurants and nightclubs. The Stadsschouwburg, a theater, is the most notable architectural landmark on the square, and the American Hotel is close by.

=== Marie Heinekenplein ===
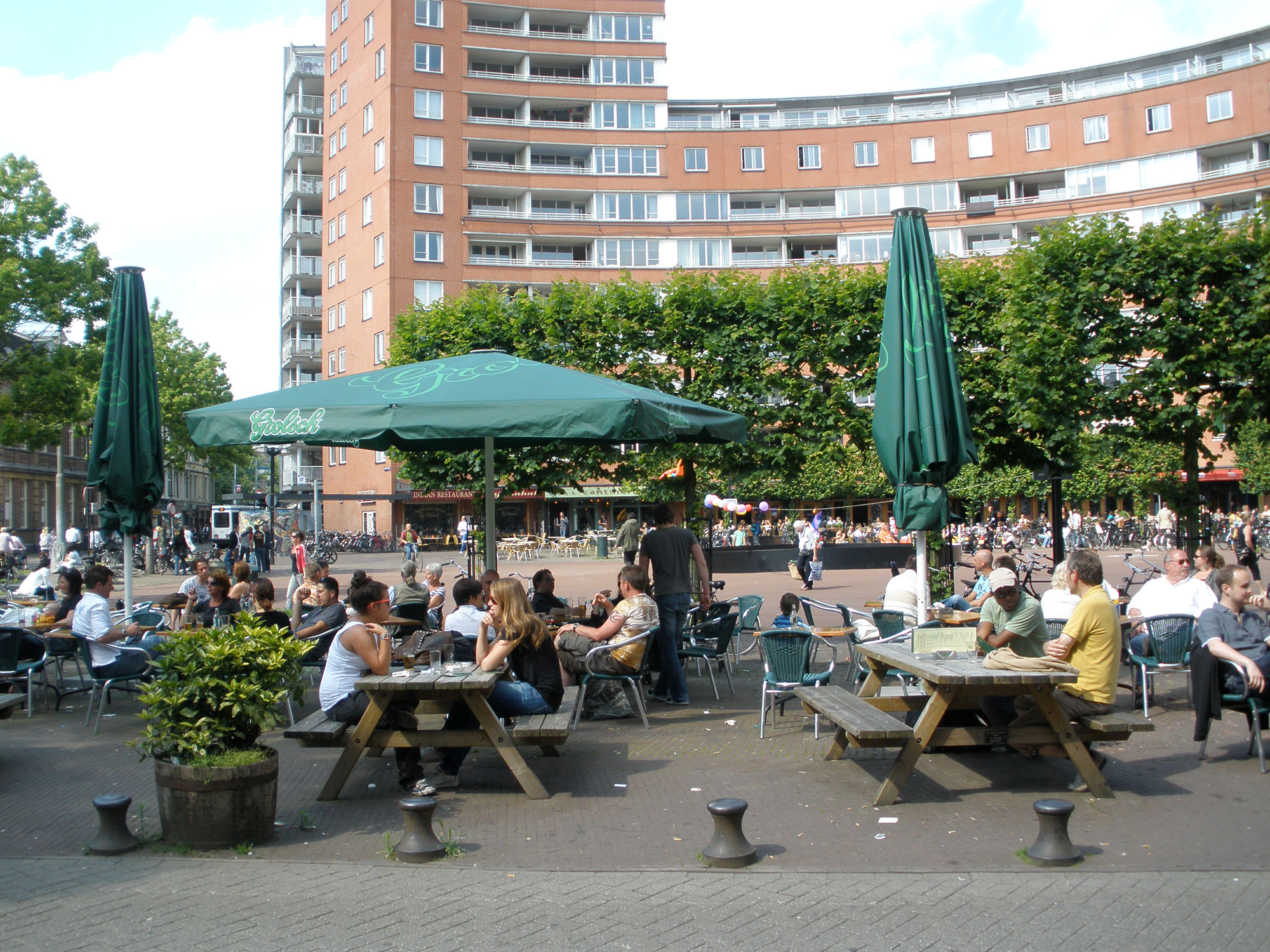
Marie Heinekenplein in June 2009

Marie Heinekenplein is popularly known as Heinekenplein. This circle-shaped square is used for various events, such as a book market and an open-air cinema. It was constructed in the early 1990s. It lies just outside the city centre, in the neighbourhood of De Pijp, along the street Ferdinand Bolstraat. The street Quellijnstraat runs along the southern edge of the square. Tram lines 16 and 24 have a stop near the square.

Along the Marie Heinekenplein are a number of bars and cafés. The square is lined with café terraces. Between the square and the Stadhouderskade street is the former Heineken brewery, now a popular tourist attraction known as the Heineken Experience. Along the northern side of the square is a modern apartment building incorporating a supermarket and other shops at ground level. One of the three restaurants of renowned Chinese restaurant chain Nam Kee is located along the square.

=== Markenplein ===
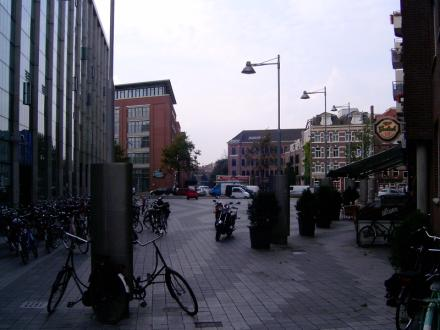
Markenplein

Prior to 1970, Markenplein was named het oude Markenpleintje and before World War II it used to be a part of the Jewish district of Amsterdam. The name Markenplein symbolizes the bond between the new neighborhood and the old Jewish neighborhood.

The pavement pattern was designed by the American artist Sol LeWitt.

The square houses the entrance of the Netherlands Film and Television Academy, the parking garage Markenhoven and the Grand Cafe Allure.

=== Muntplein ===
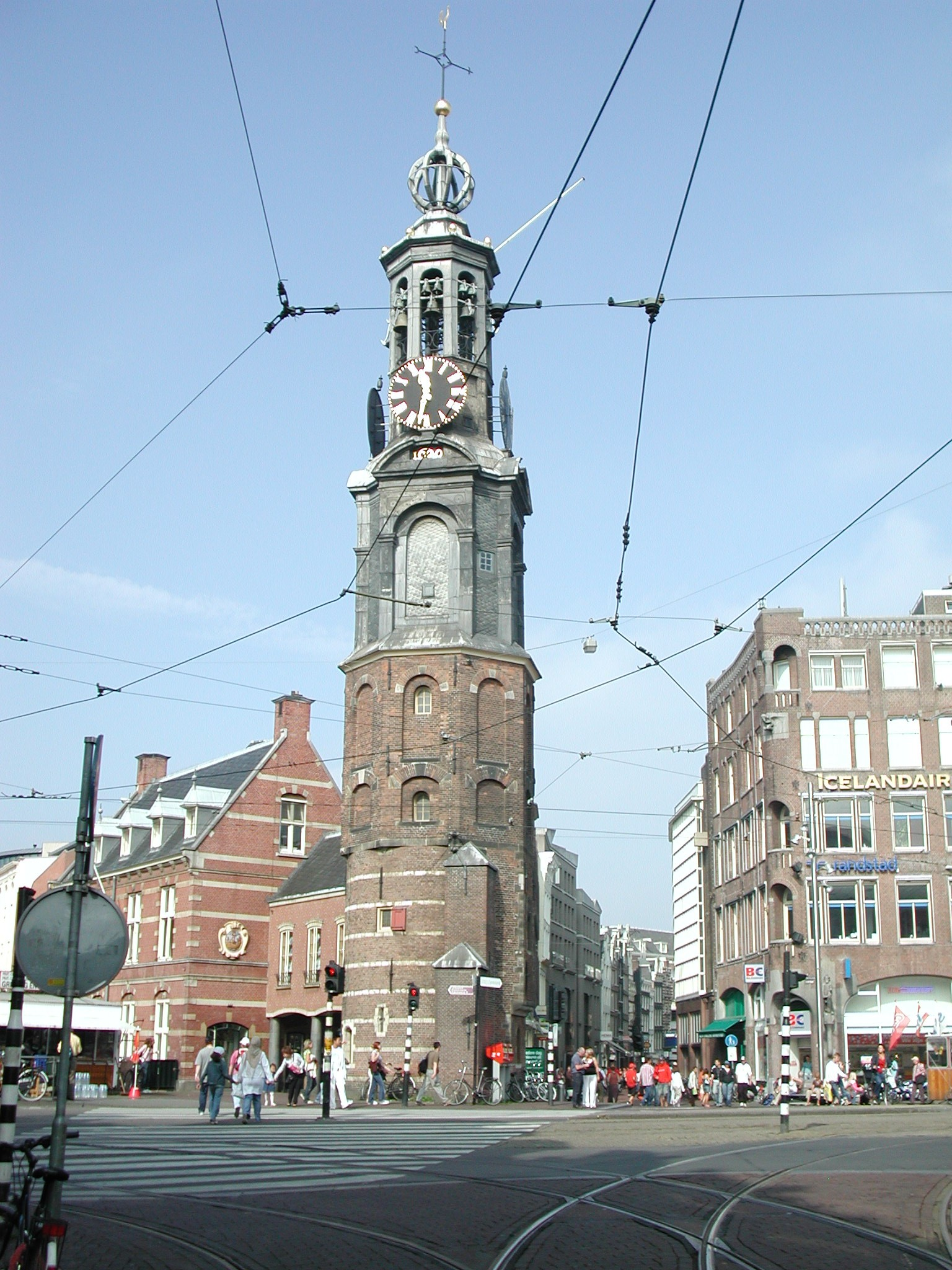
Muntplein

Muntplein, often referred to simply as the "Munt", is in fact a bridge — the widest bridge in Amsterdam — which crosses the Singel canal at the point where it flows into the Amstel river. The square is a bustling intersection of six streets. It forms the southern end of the Kalverstraat shopping street and the major street Rokin. The eastern end of the floating flower market (Bloemenmarkt) along the Singel canal is directly south of the square.

Muntplein is named after the Munttoren (or simply Munt) tower which stands on this square.

=== Museumplein ===
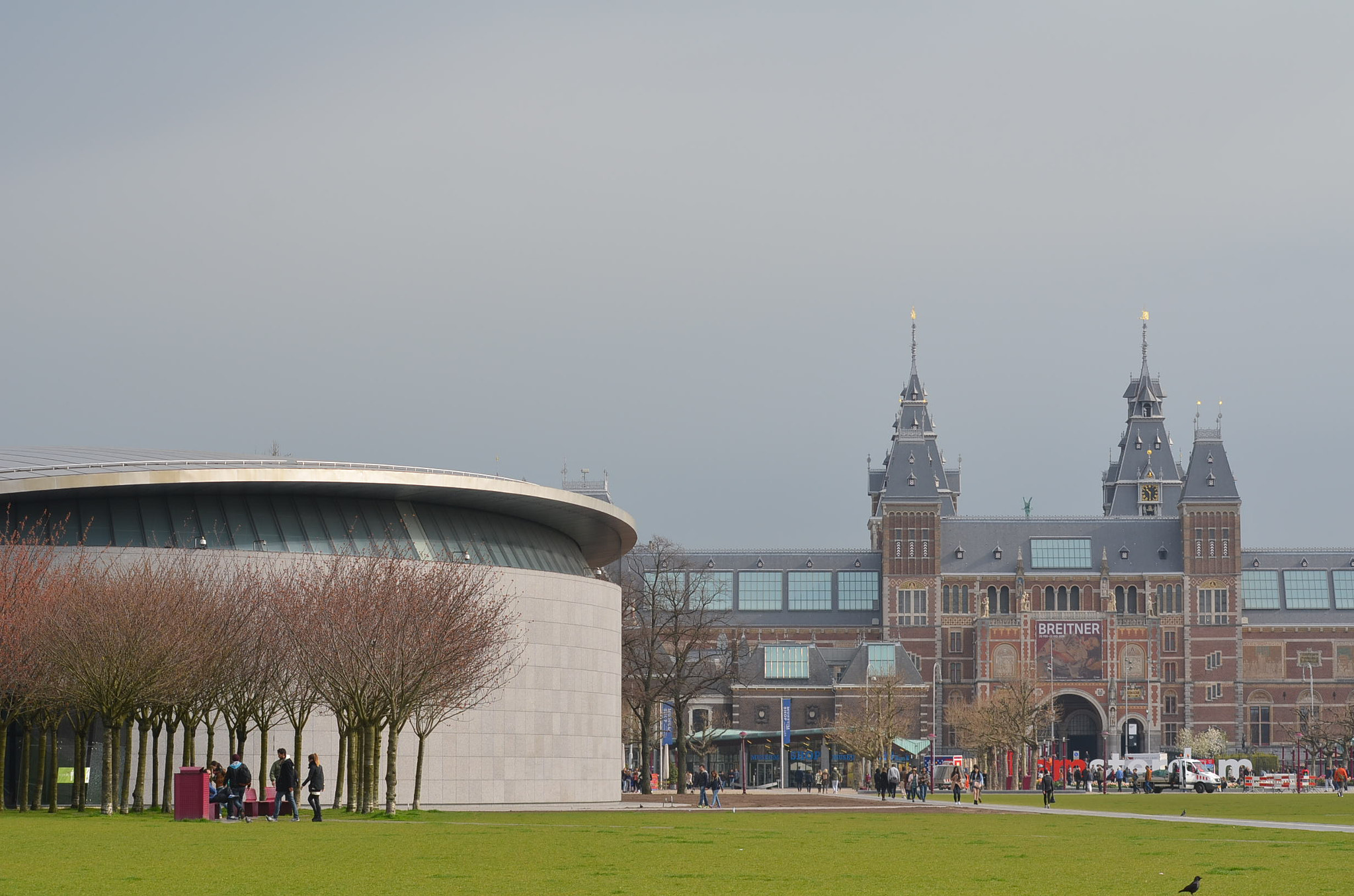
Museumplein

Museumplein is located in the Museumkwartier neighbourhood, beside three major museums – the Rijksmuseum, Van Gogh Museum, and Stedelijk Museum – and the concert hall Concertgebouw.

=== Nieuwmarkt ===
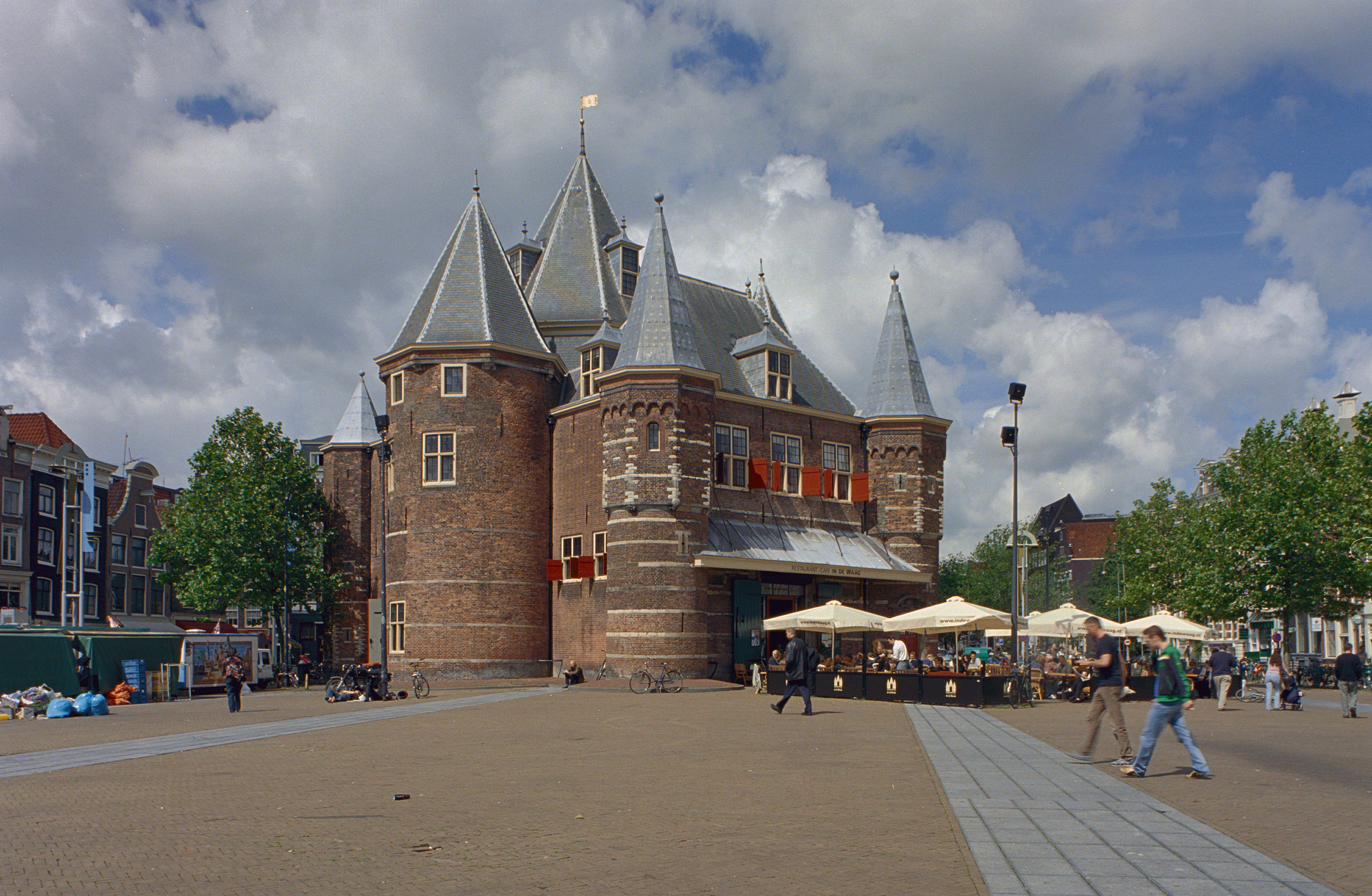
Nieuwmarkt in 2002

Nieuwmarkt (Dutch for "New Market" is located in Amsterdam's Chinatown, next to the De Wallen (Red Light District). It is dominated by a building known as the Waag. There are over 20 cafés and coffeeshops facing the square. There is a daily market on the square, as well as an organic food market on Saturdays and a market for antiques and books on Sundays in the summer months.

=== Noordermarkt ===
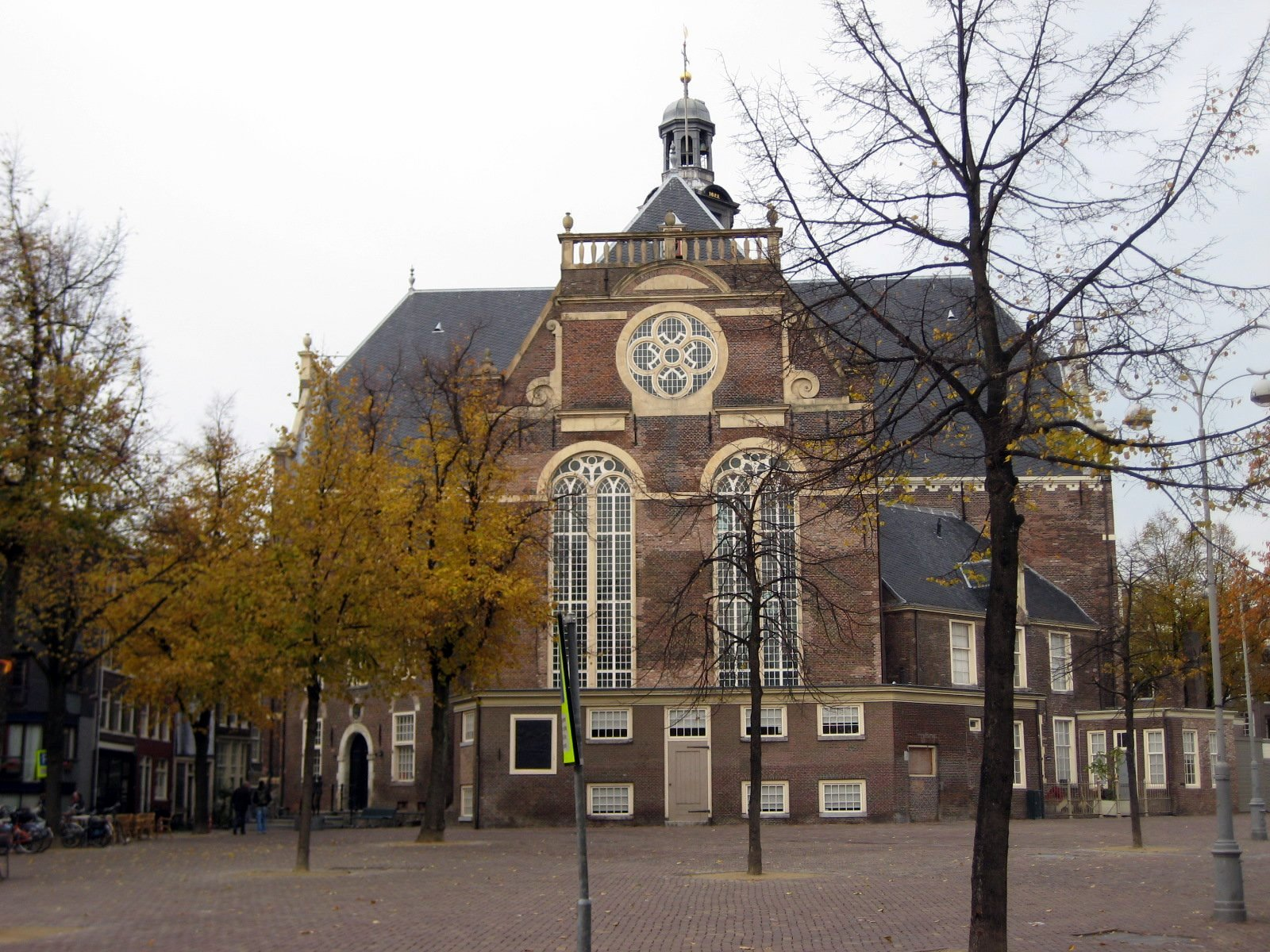
Noordermarkt

Noordermarkt is located in the Jordaan neighborhood. It is lined by cafés and restaurants. Markets are held on the square every Monday. On Saturdays, a popular organic farmer's market is held on the square. On Mondays a market (mainly for textiles) is also held in the adjacent Westerstraat street.

=== Oudekerksplein ===
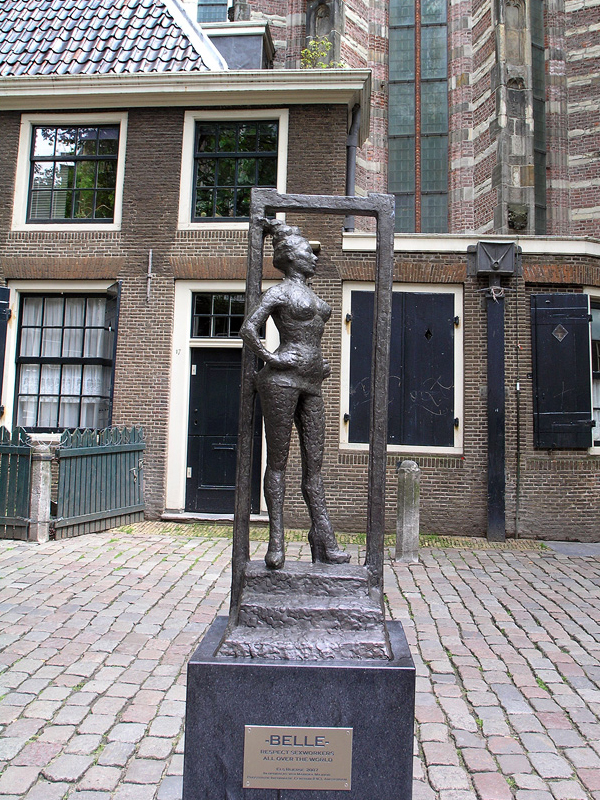
The statue "Belle" on the Oudekerksplein. The plaque reads: "Respect sex workers all over the world"

Oudekerksplein ("Old Church's Square") marks the eastern end of the Red Light District and is wedged between the Warmoesstraat street and Oudezijds Voorburgwal canal. From the square, the Oudekerksburg bridge crosses the Oudezijds Voorburgwal canal and continues eastwards, through the Oudekennissteeg and Molensteeg alleys, towards the Oudezijds Achterburgwal and Zeedijk.

Originally the Oudekerksplein was a graveyard. In 1655, the graveyard was cleared and moved to a new location beyond the city limits, creating the present square.

=== Rembrandtplein ===
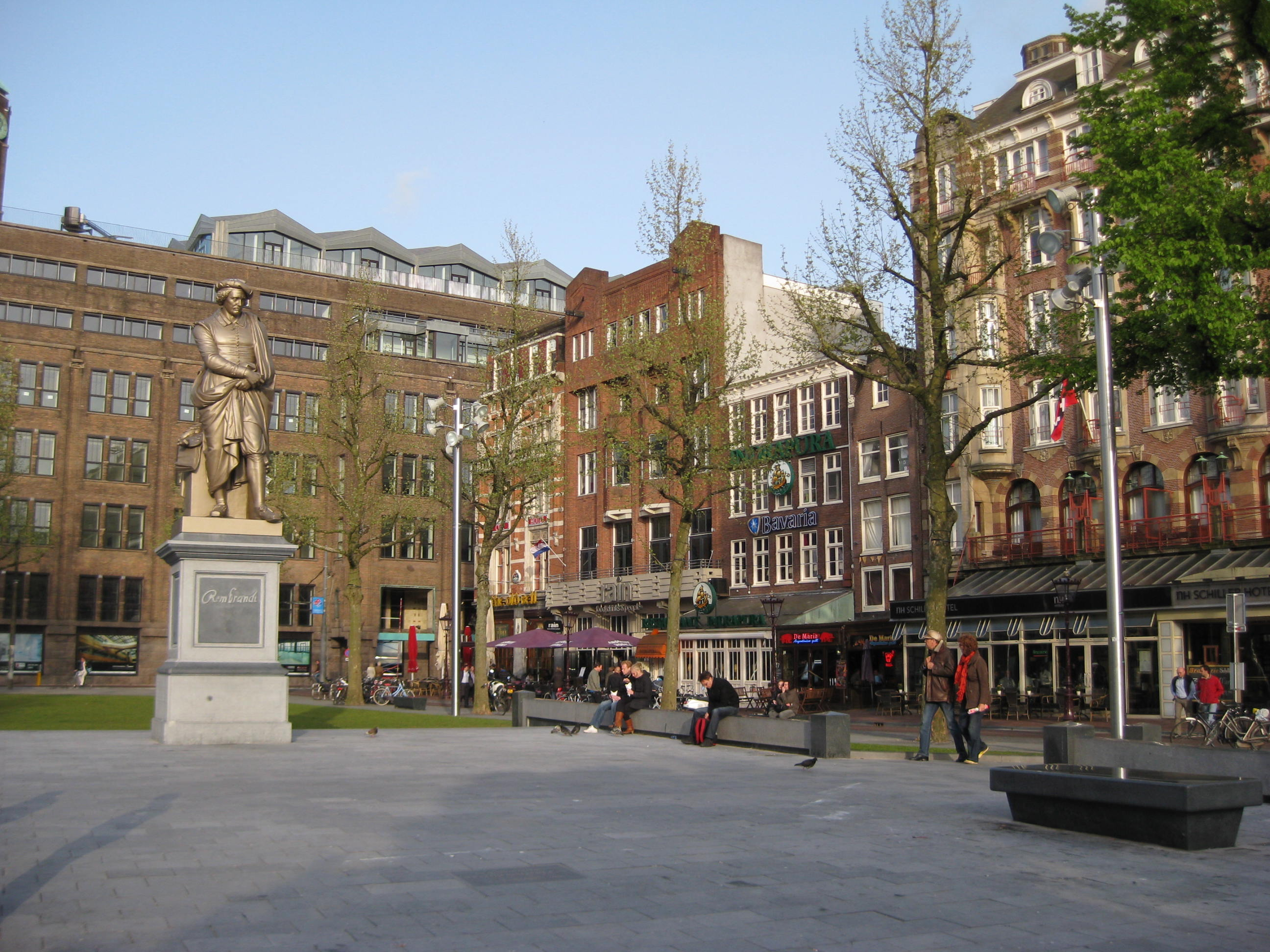
Rembrandtplein after reconstruction 2009

Rembrandtplein (Rembrandt Square) is named after the famous painter Rembrandt van Rijn who owned a house nearby from 1639 to 1656.

=== Spui ===
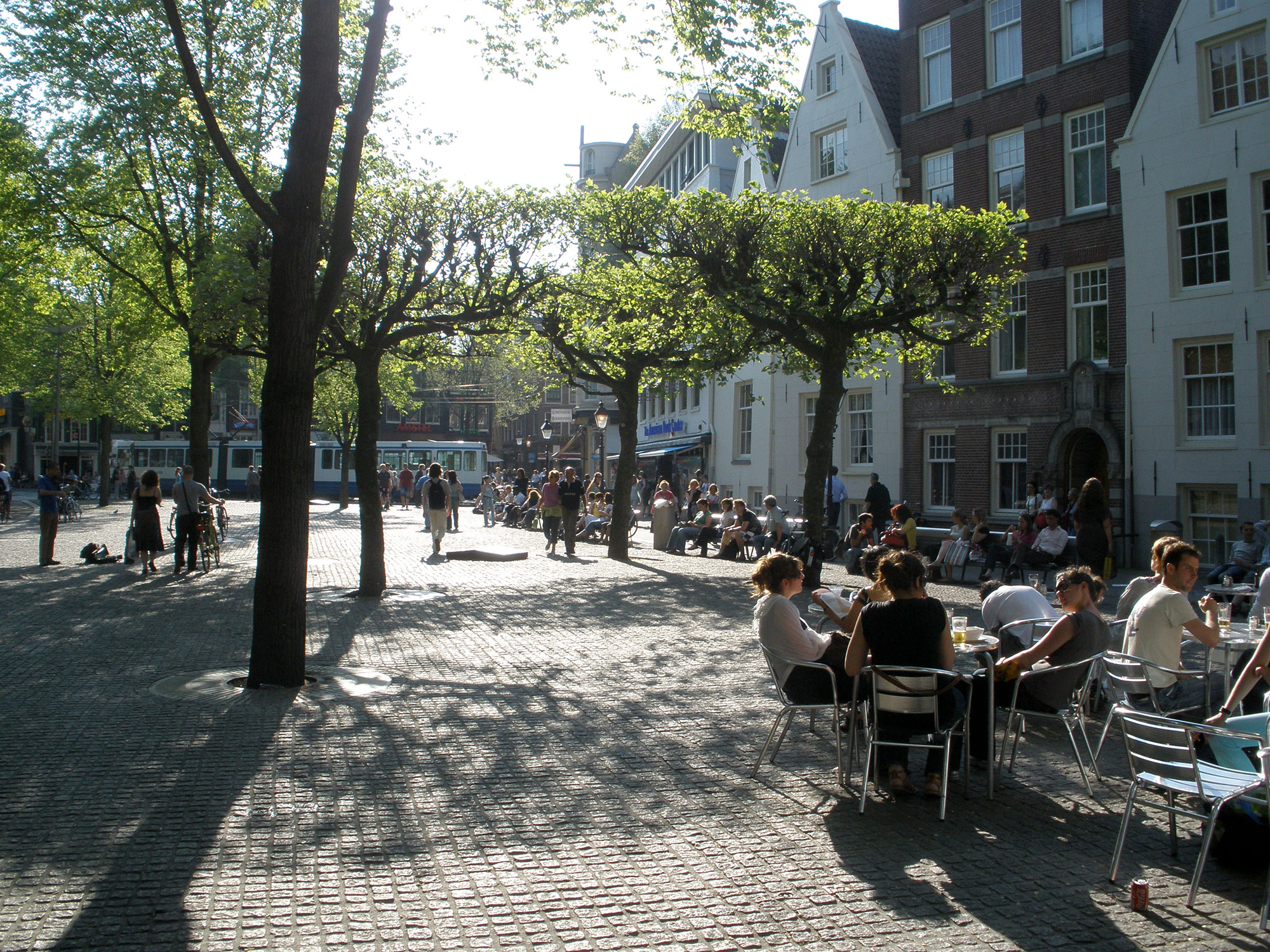
The Spui (2008). On the right is the entrance to the Begijnhof

The Spui was originally a body of water that formed the southern limit of the city until the 1420s, when the Singel canal was dug as an outer moat around the city. In 1882 the Spui was filled in and became the square that we know today. In 1996 the square was renovated and is now largely car-free.

=== Waterlooplein ===
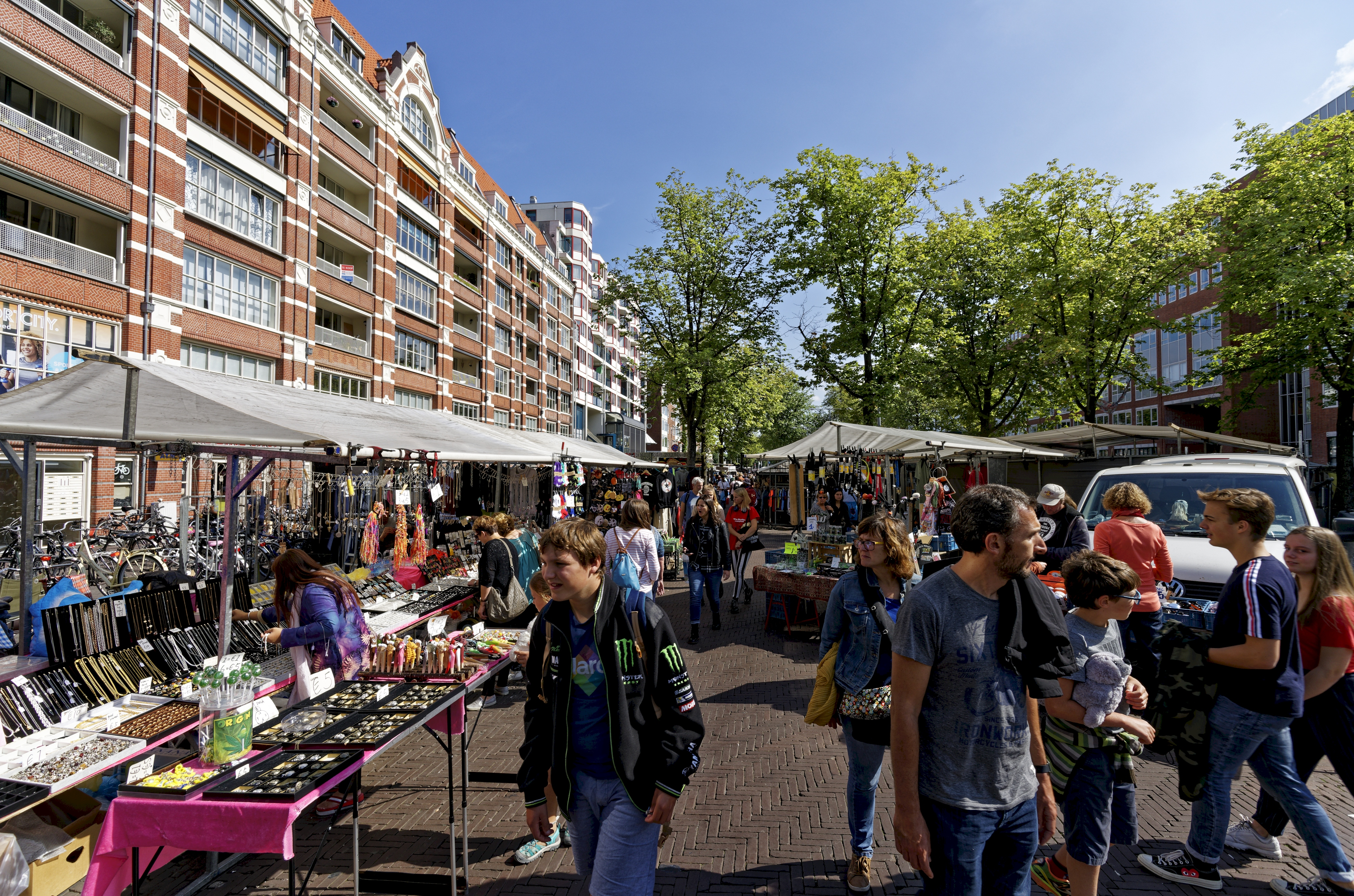
Waterlooplein flea market

Waterlooplein is located near the Amstel river. The daily flea market on the square is popular with tourists. The Stopera city hall and opera building and the Mozes en Aäronkerk church are at Waterlooplein. The area of Amsterdam that includes Waterlooplein is also called Groot Waterloo district.

== Comprehensive list ==
The following is a more comprehensive list:

Adam Smithplein, Alexanderplein, Amstelveld, Anton de Komplein, August Allebéplein, Barentzplein, Bellamyplein, Beursplein, Bijlmerplein, Boerhaaveplein, Brink, Concertgebouwplein, Dam Square, Emmaplein, Enkhuizerplein, Europaplein, Frederiksplein, Gerard Douplein, H.M. van Randwijkplantsoen, Haarlemmerplein, Hekelveld, Hendrik Jonkerplein, Henriëtte Ronnerplein, Hoofddorpplein, Hugo de Grootplein, Hygieaplein, Jacob Marisplein, Johannes Vermeerplein, Johnny Jordaanplein, Jonas Daniël Meijerplein, Julianaplein, Kadijksplein, Kattenburgerplein, Kleine-Gartmanplantsoen, Koekoeksplein, Koningsplein, Leidseplein, Markenplein, Max Euweplein, Meerhuizenplein, Mercatorplein, Merwedeplein, Minervaplein, Mr. Visserplein, Muntplein, Museumplein, Muzenplein, Nassauplein, Nieuwezijds Kolk, Nieuwmarkt, Noordermarkt, Olympiaplein, Oosterspoorplein, Osdorpplein, Oudekerksplein, Professor Tulpplein, Rapenburgerplein, Rembrandtplein, Roelof Hartplein, Scheldeplein, Sierplein, Smaragdplein, Spaarndammerplantsoen, Spui, Stadionplein, Stationsplein, Surinameplein, Thérèse Schwartzeplein, Thomas R. Malthusstraat, Thorbeckeplein, Valeriusplein, Van Limburg Stirumplein, Van Tuyll van Serooskerkenplein, Victorieplein, Waterlooplein, Weesperplein, Westermarkt, Weteringplantsoen, Wg-plein, Zaandammerplein, Zonneplein, and Zwanenplein.

== See also ==
- List of parks in Amsterdam
- List of tourist attractions in Amsterdam
