= KDSO =

KDSO may refer to:

- KDSO (AM), a radio station (1300) licensed to serve Phoenix, Oregon, United States
- KDSO-LD, a low-power television station (channel 24, virtual 16) licensed to serve Medford, Oregon
