= Anna Song =

Anna Song may refer to:

- Anna Song (politician), American politician
- Anna Canzano, American television journalist, formerly known as Anna Song
- Anna (Go to Him), a 1963 Arthur Alexander song covered by the Beatles
