= KAPL =

KAPL or Kapl may refer to:

- Gerhard Kapl (1946–2011), Austrian association football referee
- KAPL, former call sign for KDSO (AM)
- KAPL-FM
- King Abdulaziz Public Library
- Knolls Atomic Power Laboratory

== See also ==
- Kappl
