= Anna Canzano =

American broadcast journalist

- Born: Anna Song; August 21, 1977 (age 48); Taiwan
- Education: Pepperdine University
- Occupation(s): Broadcast journalist News anchor
- Employers: That Expert Show (2018-present); KOIN (2016–2018); KATU (1999–2016)
- Spouse: John Canzano (m. 2010)

Anna Song Canzano (née Song) is an American broadcast journalist who hosts That Expert Show in partnership with the Portland, Oregon-based newspaper The Oregonian. She previously worked at KOIN television in Portland, and at Portland's KATU and Los Angeles' ABC NewsOne and held an internship at KABC-TV in Los Angeles.

== Career and awards ==
Canzano has won several accolades in her career, including the 2012 Best Investigative Reporting Award from the Oregon Association of Broadcasters. She also received the Edward R. Murrow Award in Investigative Reporting in 2007 for her piece on Jordaan Clarke, who after undergoing successful heart surgery at Oregon Health and Science University (OHSU) hospital as an infant, suffered prolonged oxygen deprivation causing permanent and profound brain damage. Canzano's report revealed that OHSU benefits from rare and unusual protection from the state that caps malpractice damages at $200,000 per incident, a luxury not widely available to other entities in the state of Oregon, according to documents obtained by the reporter.

Canzano, a 16-time regional Emmy Award nominee, won an Emmy Award in 2008 in the category "Human Interest" for her investigative piece on the struggle of a homeless high school student. In 2012, Canzano won a second Emmy Award, this time in the category of "Crime Reporting." In 2003, Canzano's in-depth coverage of the murder of two Oregon City teenagers, Miranda Gaddis and Ashley Pond, and the investigation into their deaths helped earn KATU an Edward R. Murrow Award for Continuing Coverage. "Casualties of War," a documentary she co-produced and wrote in 2005, was honored with a 1st place Associated Press (AP) award for news writing. Canzano also won 1st place in the 2009 and 2008 Associated Press Awards in the Best Hard News Coverage categories, as well as the 2007, 2006, and 2005 Best Writing category. She has also won 1st place awards in Best Investigative Reporting, documentary and feature categories, for Oregon, from the AP.

Canzano, born in Taiwan, began working as a reporter for KATU in 1999, later becoming one of the station's regular weekend news anchor in 2003. She continued serving in that position until December 2016, when she announced on-air and via Twitter that she was moving to another Portland television station. KOIN announced in January 2017 that it hired Canzano away from KATU.

== Acting and voice-over work ==
In 2021, Canzano was featured as a news reporter in the Peacock television series The Girl in the Woods, a Crypt TV production. In 2018, Canzano played a news reporter named "Caitlin Marsdale" in the Netflix series American Vandal. She has also worked as voice-over talent on a variety projects including Nike's Dream Further campaign for the 2019 Women's World Cup, KFC's Robocop campaign and Lil Dicky's Earth music video, a charity single released on April 19, 2019, three days before Earth Day, featuring vocals from more than 30 artists.

== The Bald-Faced Truth Foundation ==
In 2009, Anna Song co-founded The Bald Faced Truth Foundation, a non-profit, all-volunteer organization that aims to fund extracurricular activities for kids. The foundation offers grants to children who hope to participate in the areas of arts, music, drama, education, athletics and other enriching extracurricular activities.

== Personal life ==
In July 2010, she married John Canzano, then a sports columnist for The Oregonian and afternoon-drive radio show host at 750AM. Following the marriage, she changed her professional name from Anna Song to Anna Canzano. They have three children.
