= John Canzano =

American sports journalist

- Canzano in 2010
- Born: Medford, Oregon, U.S.
- Spouse: Anna Song (m. 2010)
- Children: 3
- Presenting career
- Show: The Bald-Faced Truth
- Stations: 620-AM in Portland, Oregon (syndicated also in Eugene on Fox Sports Eugene 95.7-FM and 1050-AM and in Klamath Falls on KLAD 93.3-FM) and in Roseburg on KSKR (1490-AM) and in Medford on KDSO (1300-AM and 107.9 FM). The show is syndicated in Newport, Corvallis, and in Boise, Idaho.
- Time slot: 2 p.m. to 3 p.m. PST
- Style: Sports radio
- Country: United States
- Website: www.johncanzano.com

John Canzano is an American sports columnist, syndicated radio talk show host in the Pacific Northwest. The show is syndicated in Portland on 620-AM, and also in Eugene, Medford, Roseburg, Newport, Corvallis, and Klamath Falls, Oregon. The show also airs in Boise, Idaho on KTIK.

The show is licensed to KGW-TV, Portland's NBC affiliate. One episode weekly airs on Saturdays.

He writes his column at JohnCanzano.com and hosted a daily radio show called The Bald-Faced Truth. From 2002 to 2022, he was the lead sports columnist at The Oregonian and a sports commentator on KGW-TV, Portland's NBC affiliate.

== Early life and education ==
Canzano was born in Medford, Oregon. He grew up in Gilroy, California and graduated from Gilroy High School. He graduated from California State University, Chico, in 1995 with a B.A. in English. While at Chico State, he played baseball.

== Career ==
In his career, Canzano worked at six daily newspapers including The San Jose Mercury News and The Fresno Bee. He covered University of Notre Dame football and Indiana University basketball as the beat writer during the tenure of coach Bob Knight. He is a former national Major League Baseball writer and national NFL writer at the San Jose Mercury News as well. He has also covered five Olympic Games.

Canzano was hired as lead sports columnist at The Oregonian in 2002. He also appears on KGW-TV, where he offers commentary and analysis on sports. Canzano also hosts a radio show called "The Bald-Faced Truth" on Portland's 750 AM "The Game". The radio show airs weekdays from 3-6 p.m. in the Portland metro area. The show is also syndicated in Eugene, Oregon, on Fox Sports Eugene (95.7-FM and 1050-AM), KDSO (107.9 FM and 1300 AM) in Medford, Oregon, and in Klamath Falls, Oregon, on KLAD (104.3-FM and 960-AM).

He worked as the NFL and Major League Baseball columnist at the San Jose Mercury News and is a member of the Baseball Writers' Association of America. He holds a Baseball Hall of Fame Vote and is a voter for the Heisman Trophy. Canzano's work has also appeared in GQ magazine and The Sporting News.

Canzano left The Oregonian in March 2022, after 20 years with the newspaper to start his own writing endeavor at JohnCanzano.com. It is the No. 1-ranked sports-related Substack. In August 2022, he launched a college football podcast with Jon Wilner of The San Jose Mercury News called "Canzano & Wilner: The Podcast."

=== Awards and honors ===
Canzano is a 17-time Associated Press Sports Editors (APSE) award winner. He's won APSE awards in four different writing categories (column, investigative reporting, enterprise and projects), with his most recent awards coming in 2022, 2019 and 2018 in the investigative category and in 2016, 2017 and 2023 for column writing. In 2008, Canzano was voted America's No. 1 sports columnist among large-circulation newspapers by the APSE. In 2006 and 2007, Canzano finished second in the same category, both times to Bill Plaschke of the Los Angeles Times.

In 2010 and again in 2015, the Society of Professional Journalists named Canzano the National Sports Columnist of the Year.

The Press Club of Atlantic City recognized Canzano with the National Headliner Award national sportswriter of the year in 2004, 2010 and 2014. Canzano's investigative work and reporting about Brenda Tracy, the survivor of an alleged gang raped by four college football players, was recognized as the best sports writing in 2014 with a first place in the National Headliner Awards.

In 2013, Canzano won first place in Special Topic Column Writing in the Best of the West contest for his portfolio of columns that included a column on a soldier who died in action in Afghanistan and Canzano's own experience coaching a girls fourth-grade volleyball team with a player who has Down Syndrome.

In 2002, Canzano was named the nation's top investigative sports writer by the Associated Press News Executives Council for his enterprise piece on Carlos Rodriguez, a 21-year-old Dominican basketball star who was masquerading as a 17-year-old high school basketball player.

Canzano is a six-time Oregon Sportswriter of the Year winner (2005, 2006, 2012, 2013, 2014, 2021) as named by the National Sports Media Association (NSMA). In 2016, the NSMA named Canzano the "Broadcaster of the Year" for the state of Oregon.

== Personal life ==
In July 2010, Canzano married Anna Song, then weekend anchor for Portland television station KATU. He and his wife have three daughters: Dakota, Graziana and Sojourner.

In 2009, Canzano co-founded The Bald Faced Truth Foundation, a 501(c)(3) nonprofit organization funding extracurricular activities for children.
