= Westerstraat =

Street in Amsterdam

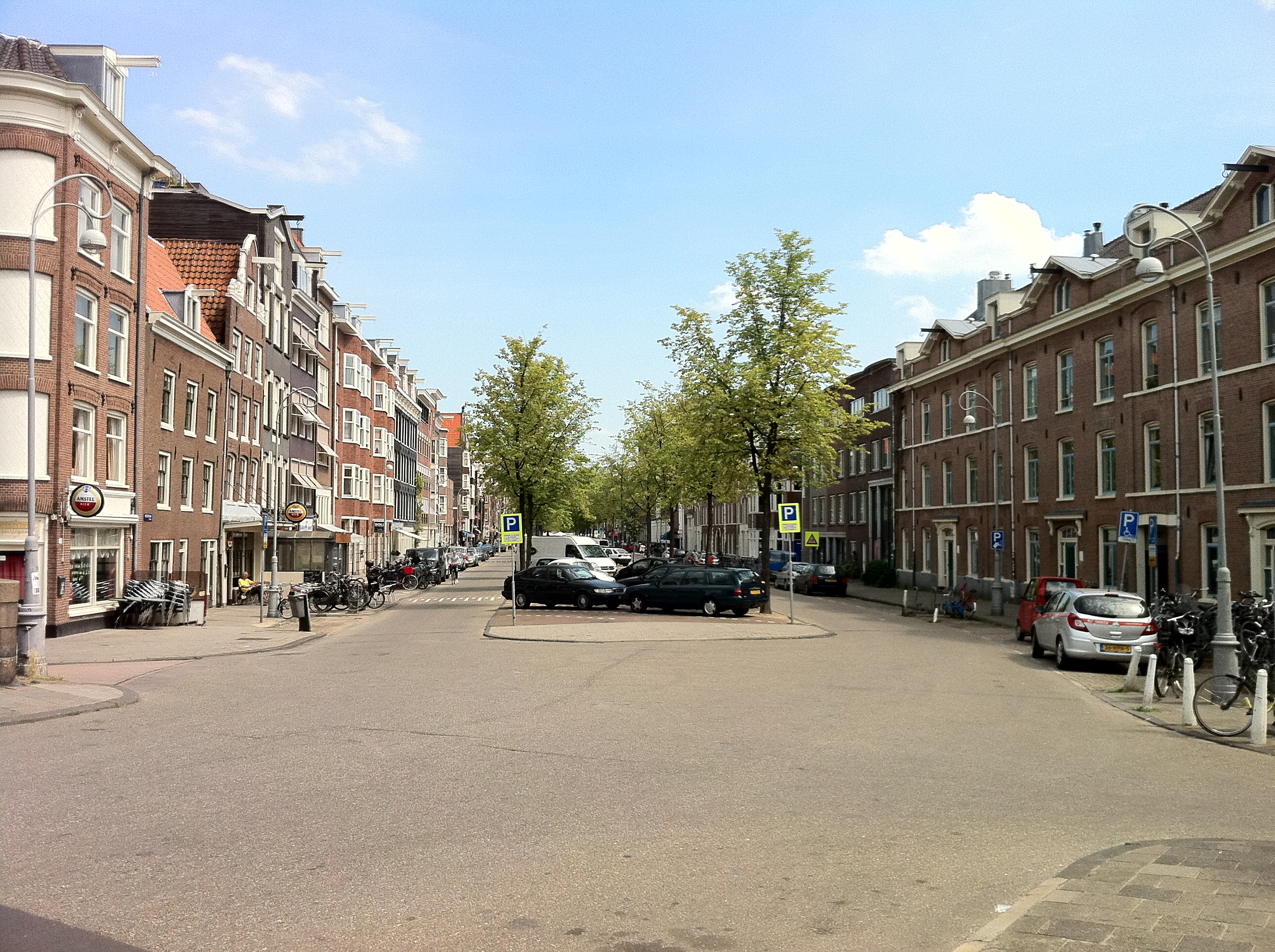
- Westerstraat, July 2011, seen from the Anjeliersbrug over the Lijnbaansgracht

- Location within Amsterdam
- Location: Amsterdam
- Postal code: 1016
- Coordinates: 52.378415°N 4.883358°E
- East end: Noordermarkt
- To: Marnixstraat

The Westerstraat is a major street in the Jordaan, a neighborhood of Amsterdam, in the Netherlands. The street was created by the filling in of the Anjeliersgracht. It runs from the Noordermarkt to the Marnixstraat. Besides residential homes and shops, including a supermarket, there are restaurants and cafes.

== History ==
The Anjeliersgracht was dug in the first half of the 17th century as part of the city's expansion program. The canal was dug in 1650; it was filled in in 1861 (the water quality was poor, and there was a need to create room for traffic), and was called Westerstraat. Between 1922 and 1932 streetcar 20 ran from the Marnixstraat through the Westerstraat to its terminus on the Noordermarkt.

There have been plans to open up some of the canals again, but citizens and businesses protested.

== Market ==
There is a market every Monday morning.

== Alleys ==
Many streets in the Jordaan had alleys between the houses; some of these were covered by other buildings in the course of time. These alleys dead-ended in the yards behind the houses; in those yards were older, frequently dilapidated, buildings that housed the poor. On the Westerstraat these included:

- the Graadboogsgang, which rendered access to numbers 19-31
- the Wassendemaansgang, nos. 39-43
- the Sterrengang, nos. 147-151
- the Rozenmarijngang, nos. 165-173
- the Bontekoegang, no. 20
- the Dolfijnengang, nos. 68-56
- an alley for nos. 78-84
- the Wittenpaardsgang, nos. 112-116
- the Zandmansgang, nos. 132-136
- the Regenboogsgang, nos. 170-172
- the Engelschmansteeg, nos. 182-194
- the Wereldsgang, nos. 157-159
- the Pottenbakkersgang, nos. 216-226

Most of these alleys were repurposed after buildings were renovated or torn down.

=== Pottenbakkersgang ===
The group of buildings on the Pottenbakkersgang (Westerstraat nrs. 216-226) were taken apart in 2002 and moved to the Nederlands Openluchtmuseum in Arnhem. The group had the status of Rijksmonument, and neighbors and organizations had protested against its planned demolition. The 17th-century buildings were the last of their kind in the Jordaan and were part of a standard system of pathways, buildings, and courtyards. Queen Beatrix opened the new set of buildings in 2012; the project was financed by the Bankgiroloterij.

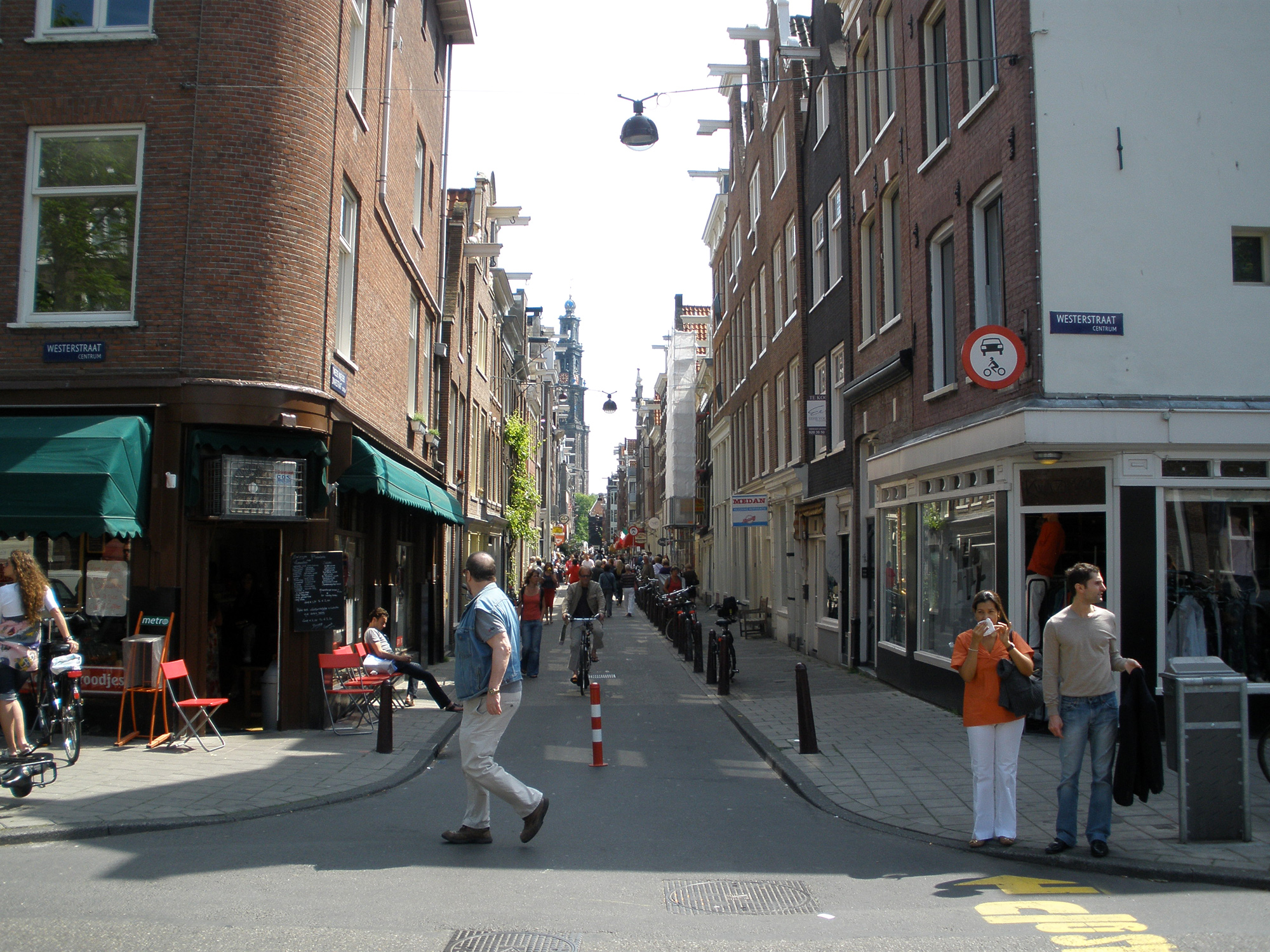
Westerstraat hoek Tweede Anjeliersdwarsstraat

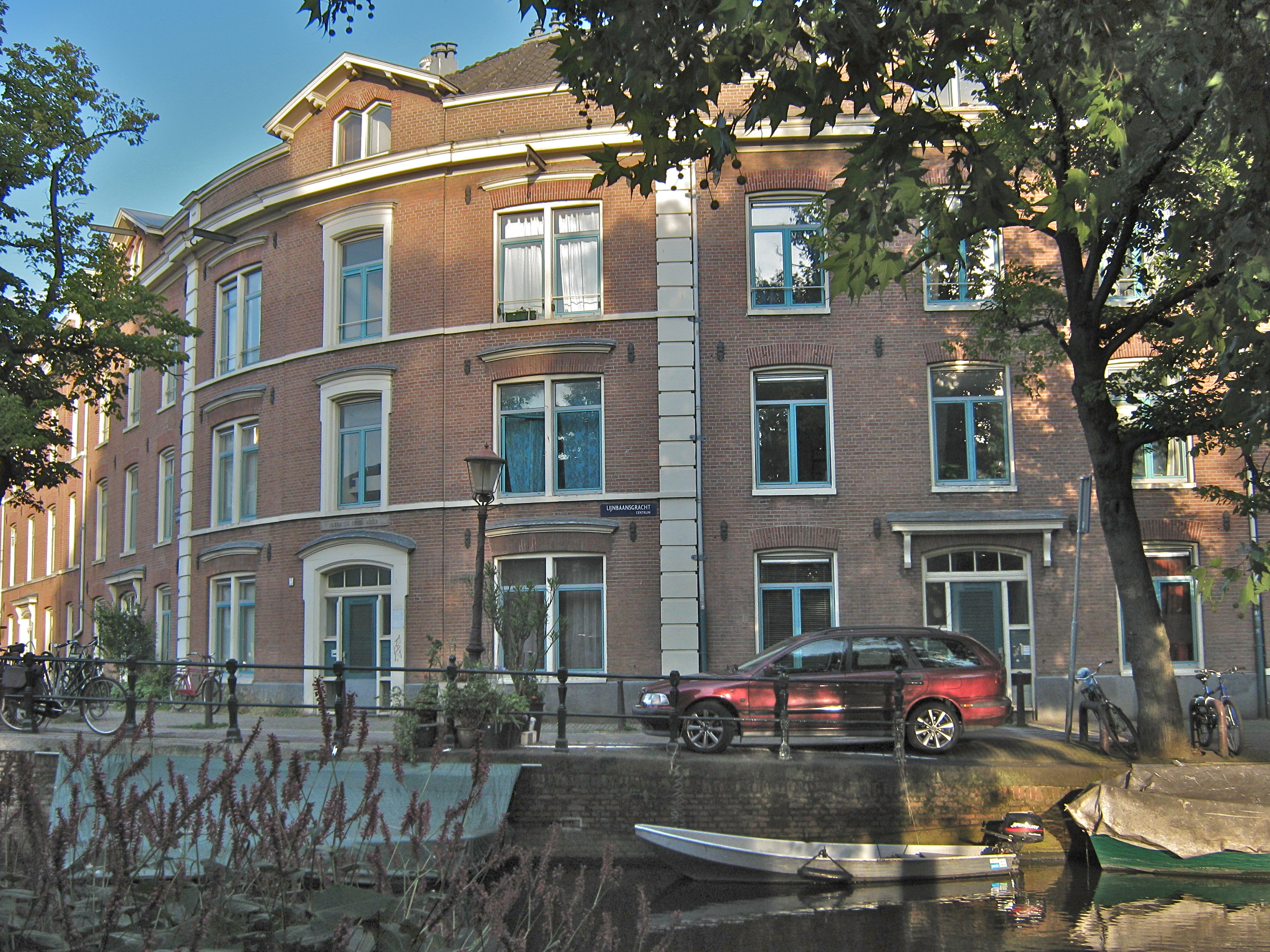
Westerstraat 327-405 / Lijnbaansgracht 63-65

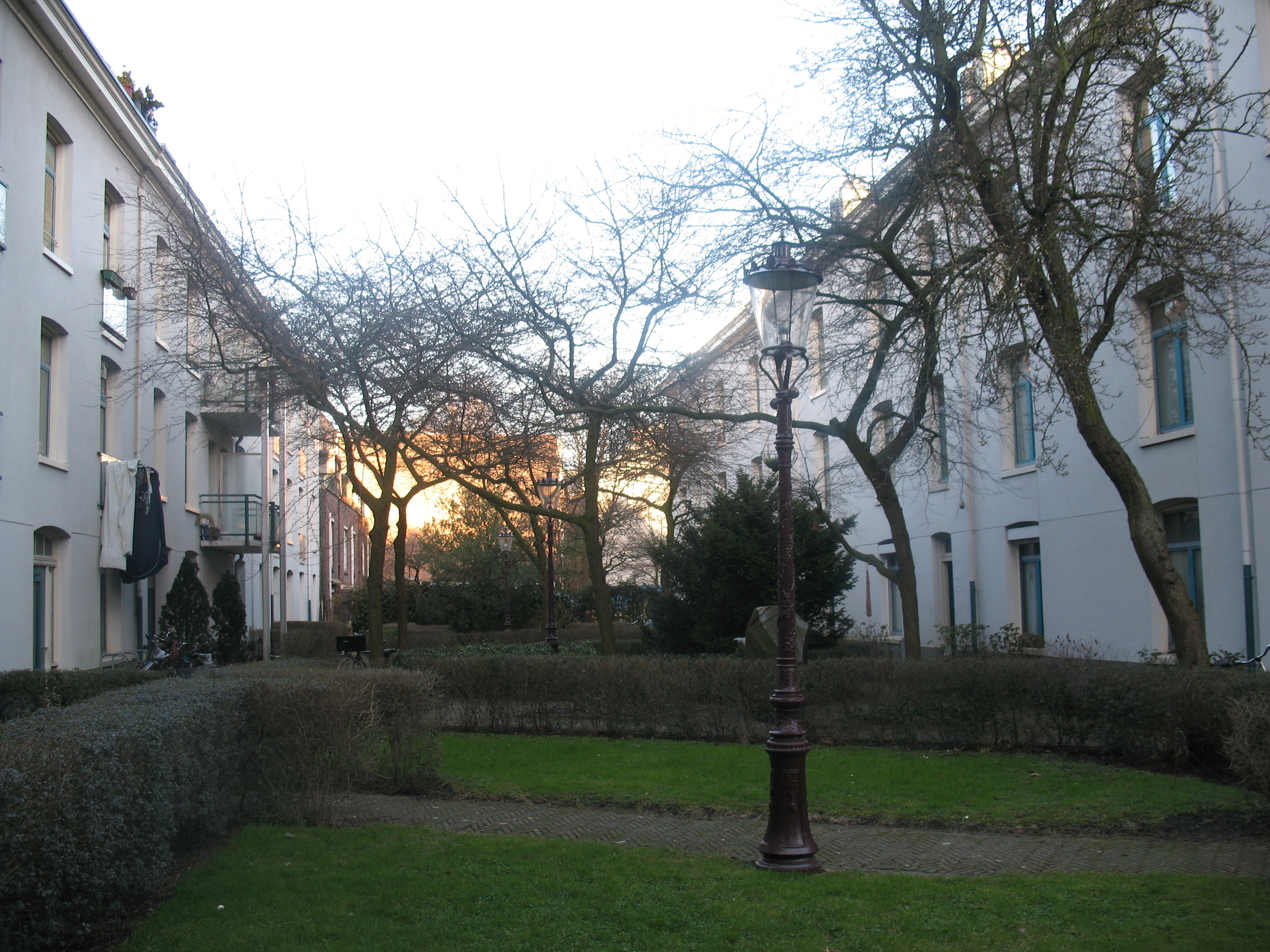
Concordiahof

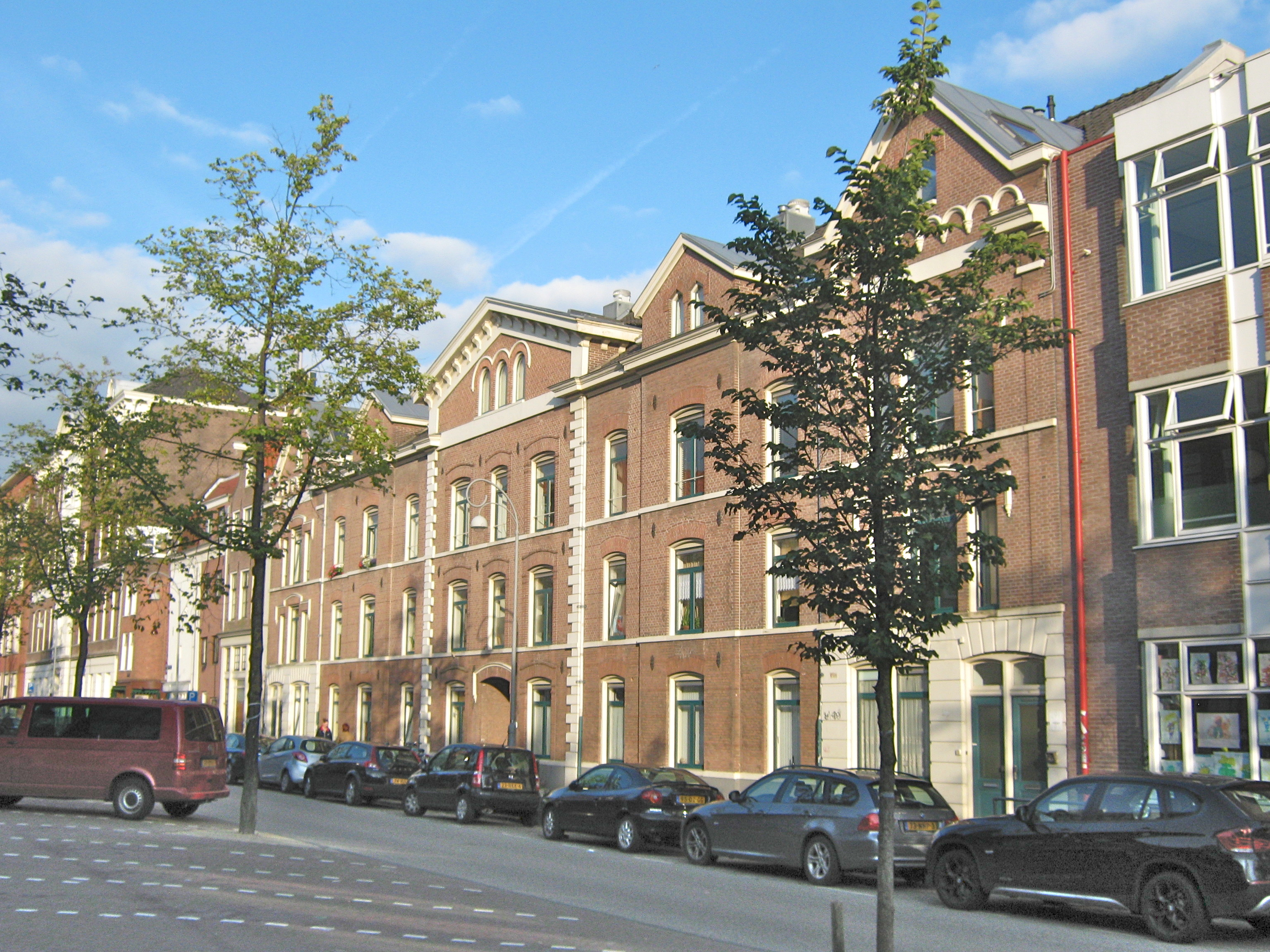
Westerstraat 215-295
