= Noordermarkt =

Square in Amsterdam, Netherlands

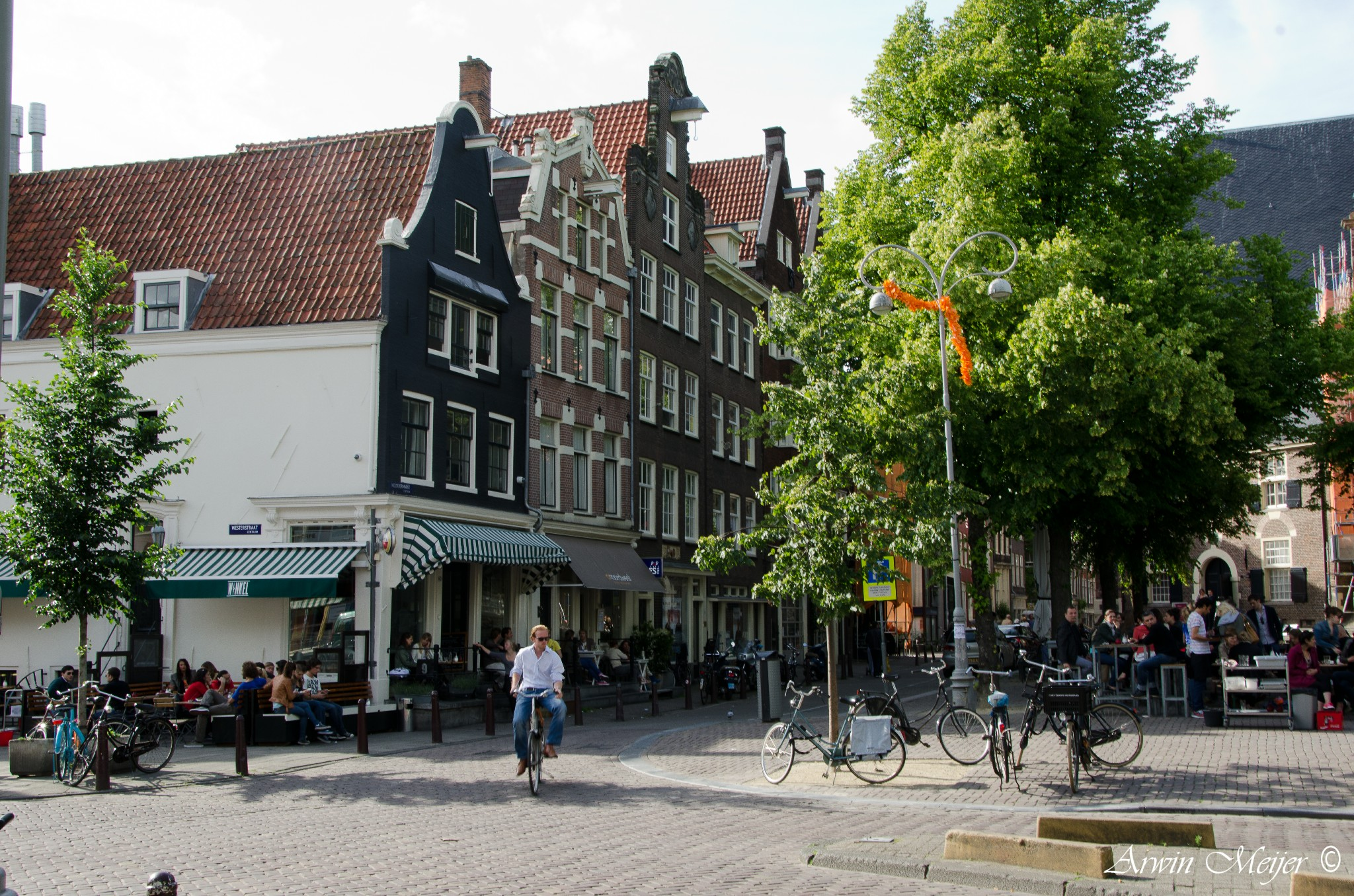
- The square seen from Westerstraat

- Location within Amsterdam
- Namesake: Noorderkerk
- Location: Centrum, Amsterdam, Netherlands
- Nearest metro station: Amsterdam Centraal
- Coordinates: 52°22′45″N 4°53′10″E

The Noordermarkt (Dutch pronunciation: [ˈnoːrdərˌmɑr(ə)kt]; English: Northern Market) is a square in the Jordaan neighborhood of Amsterdam in the Netherlands. The square is dominated by the 17th-Century Noorderkerk church, and is lined by cafés and restaurants. Markets are held on the square every Monday. On Saturdays, a popular organic farmer's market is held on the square. On Mondays a market (mainly for textiles) is also held in the adjacent Westerstraat street.

== History ==
Noordermarkt dates back to 1616 and was originally named Prinsenmarkt, after the Prinsengracht canal which the square borders. After completion in 1623 of the Noorderkerk, the square came to be known as Noordermarkt. Until 1655 the square served mainly as a graveyard for the church.

During World War II, the organisers of the February Strike of 1941, to protest deportations of Jews by the Nazis, held their first public meetings on Noordermarkt square. This is commemorated by a plaque on the south face of the Noorderkerk church.

== Gallery ==
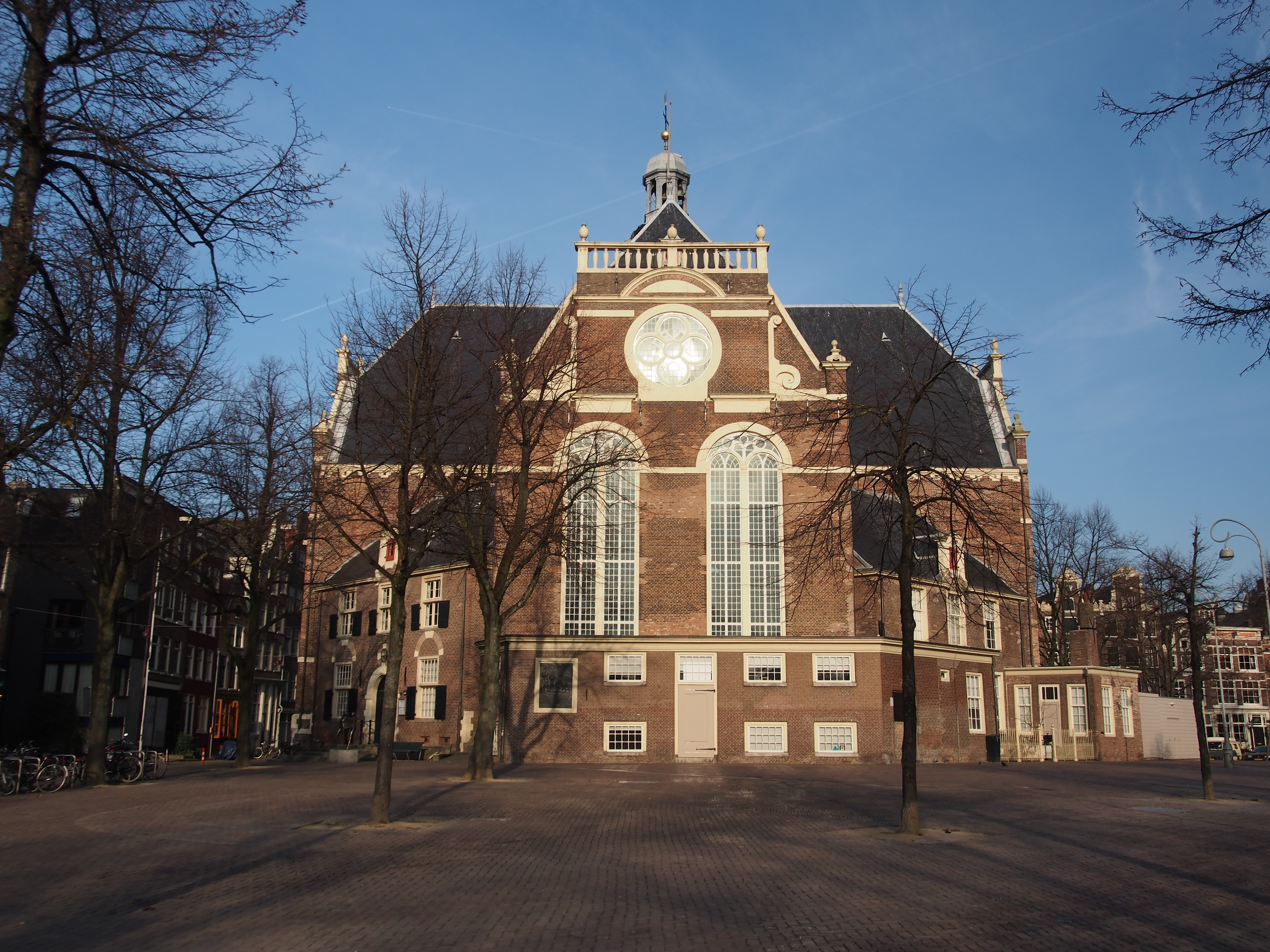
The square with the Noorderkerk

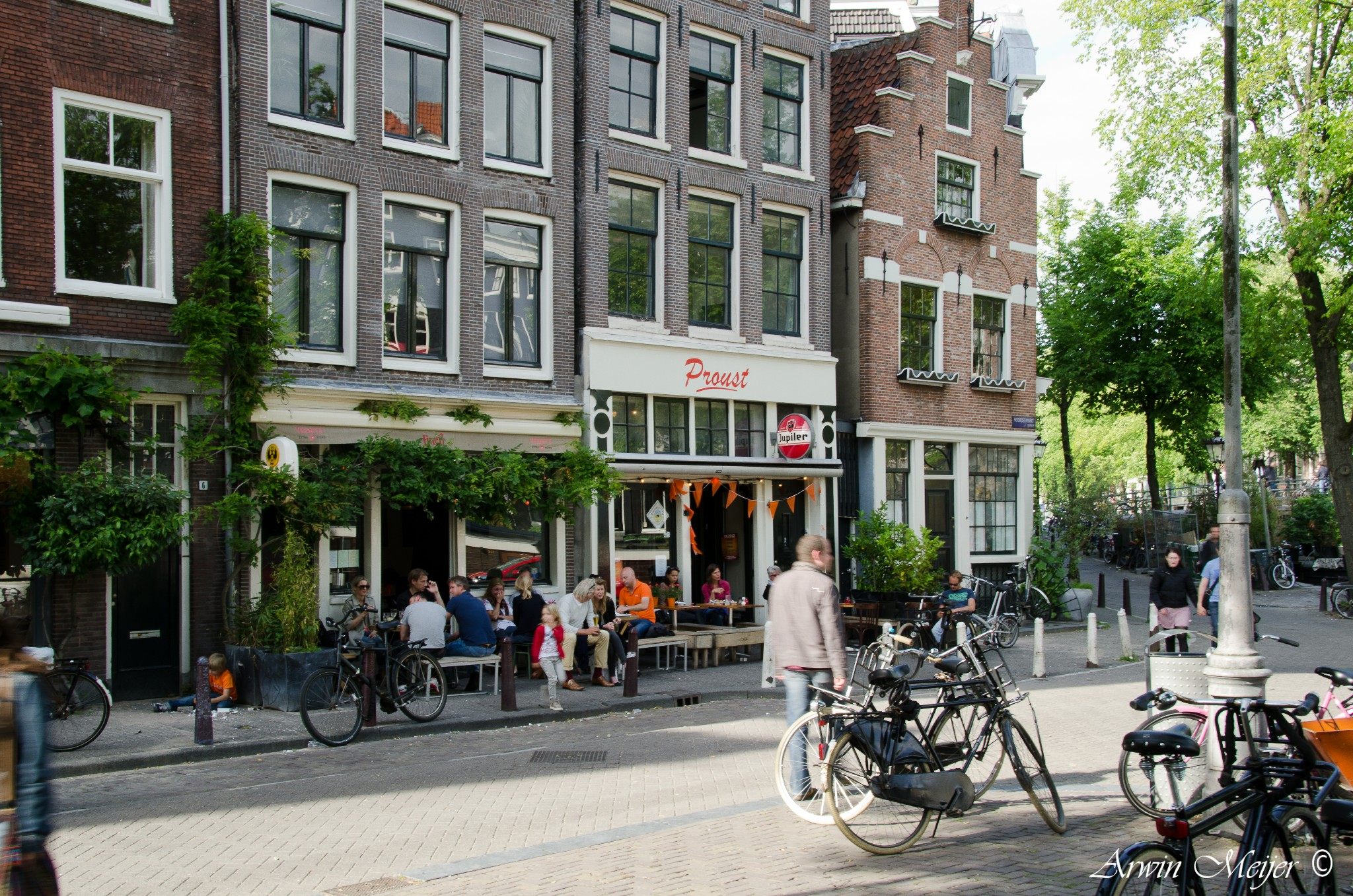
Restaurants and cafés along the northern edge of the square

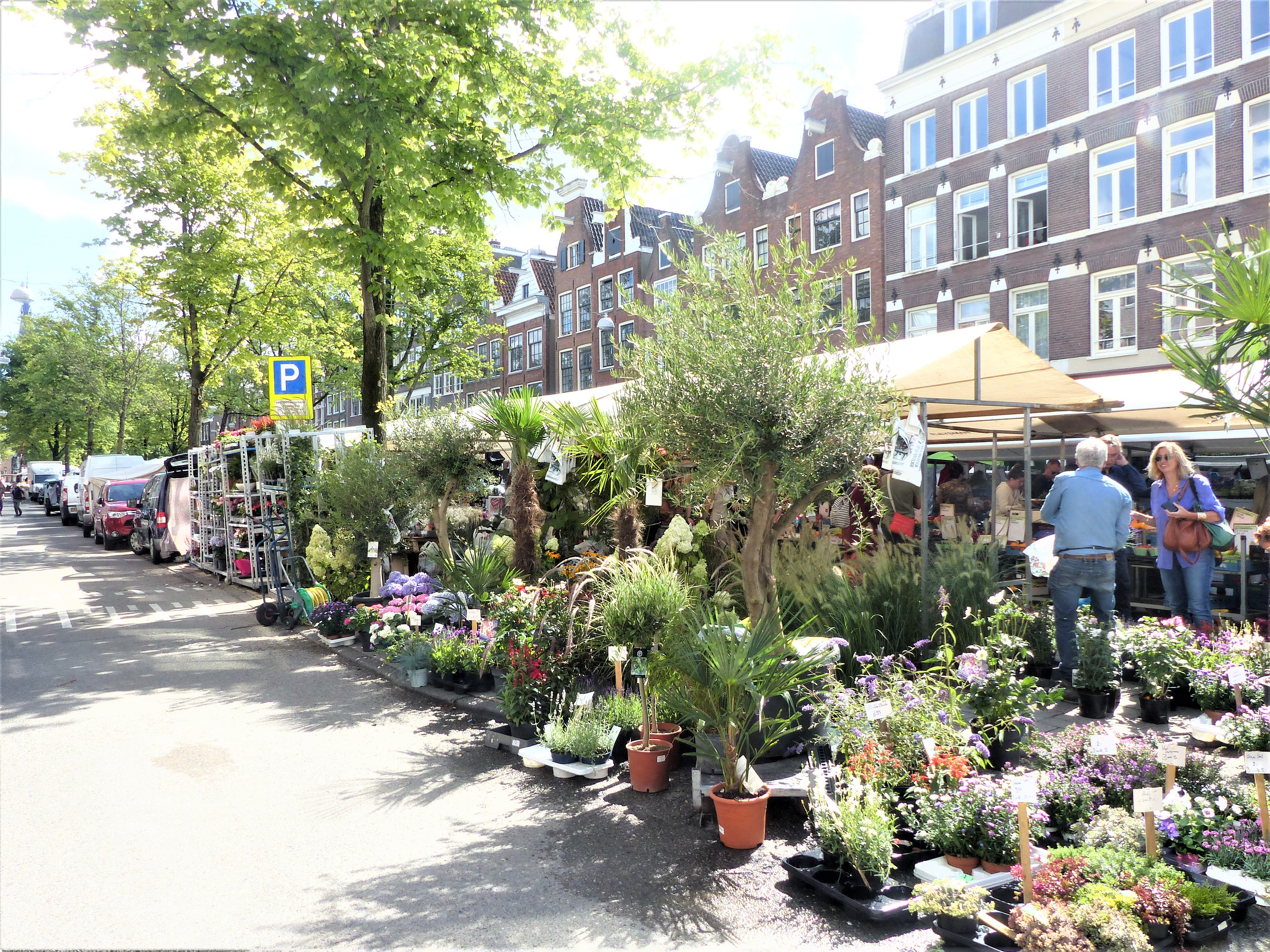
Saturday farmer's market

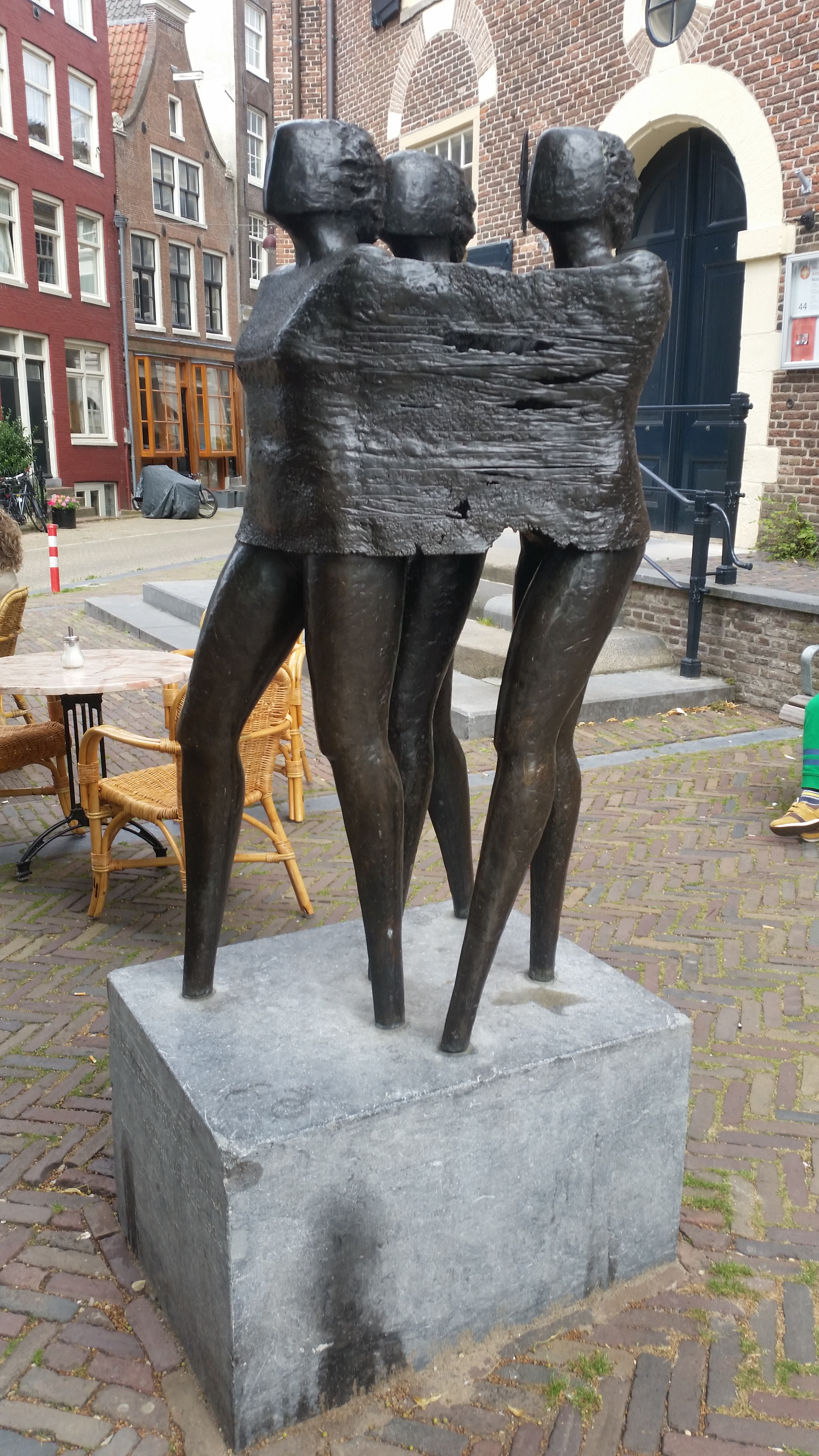
Monument to the 1934 Jordaanoproer riots
