= Kerstin Jordaan =

South african mathematician

- Born: South Africa
- Education: University of Pretoria (BSc, MSc); University of the Witwatersrand (BEd, PhD)
- Known for: Research on special functions and orthogonal polynomials
- Awards: Member, Academy of Science of South Africa; President, South African Mathematical Society (2016–2019); Executive Director, South African Mathematics Foundation
- Scientific career
- Fields: Mathematics; Special functions Orthogonal polynomials
- Workplaces: University of South Africa; University of Pretoria (former)
- Thesis: Zeros of general hypergeometric polynomials (2001)
- Doctoral advisor: Kathy Driver

Kerstin Heidrun Jordaan is a South African mathematician whose research interests include special functions and orthogonal polynomials. She is a professor in the Department of Decision Sciences at the University of South Africa, the executive director of the South African Mathematics Foundation, and the former president of the South African Mathematical Society. She was born and raised in South Africa, Jordaan has lived there throughout her life, apart from periodic research visits to various European countries as a visiting researcher. She is married and has two adult sons.

== Education and career ==
Going into her university studies, Jordaan considered medicine and psychology before ending up in mathematics. After earning a bachelor's degree in mathematics and geography at the University of Pretoria, Jordaan earned a second bachelor's degree in mathematics education at the University of the Witwatersrand, and became a secondary school mathematics teacher in Pretoria. She earned a master's degree from the University of Pretoria, before taking a break from academia to raise a family. After doing so, she returned to graduate school for a PhD from the University of the Witwatersrand. Her 2001 dissertation, Zeros of general hypergeometric polynomials, was supervised by Kathy Driver.

She was a member of the academic staff at the University of Pretoria until moving to the University of South Africa as a full professor in 2017. She served as president of the South African Mathematical Society from 2016 to 2019.

== Recognition ==
Jordaan is a member of the Academy of Science of South Africa. Jordaan is a National Research Foundation (NRF) B-rated researcher, recognised internationally for her contributions to mathematics. She has also received a Royal Society Newton Advanced Fellowship for her research on orthogonal polynomials and special functions.
