= Jordaan =

Neighbourhood in Amsterdam, Netherlands

Coordinates: 52°22′35″N 4°52′54″E

- Neighbourhood of Amsterdam
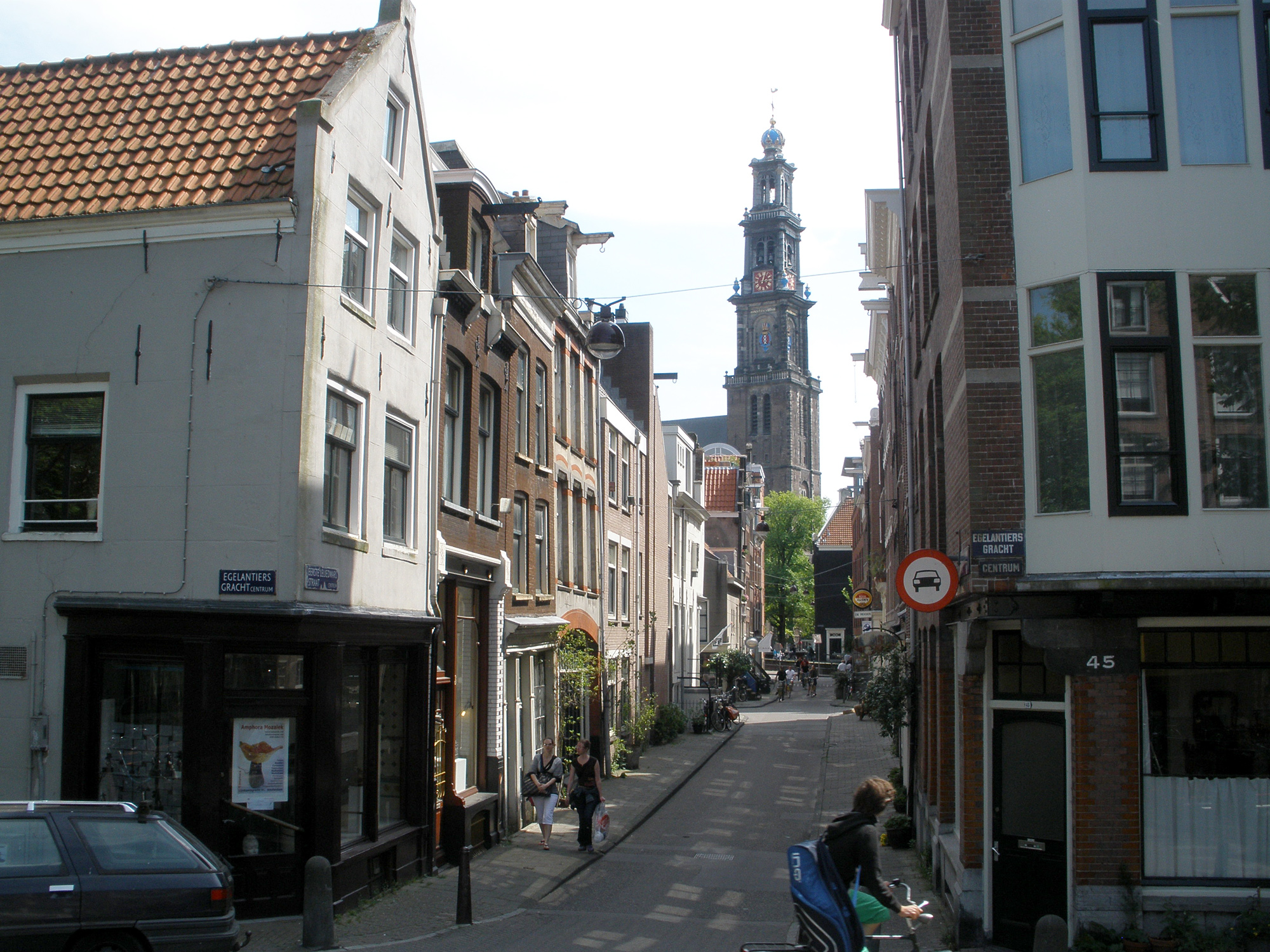
- Eerste Leliedwarsstraat

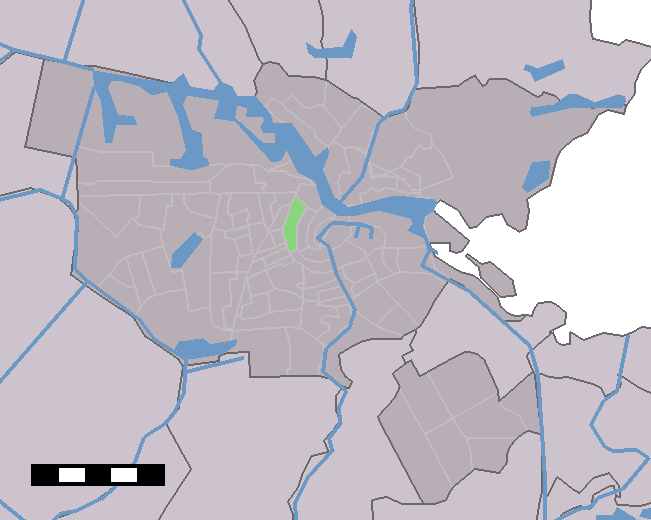
- Country: Netherlands
- Province: North Holland
- COROP: Amsterdam
- Borough: Centrum
- Time zone: UTC+1 (CET)

The Jordaan (Dutch pronunciation: [jɔrˈdaːn]) is a neighbourhood of the city of Amsterdam, Netherlands. It is part of the borough of Amsterdam-Centrum. The area is bordered by the Singelgracht canal and the neighbourhood of Frederik Hendrikbuurt to the west; the Prinsengracht to the east; the Brouwersgracht to the north and the Leidsegracht to the south. The former canal Rozengracht (now filled in) is the main traffic artery through the neighbourhood.

Originally a working-class neighbourhood, the Jordaan has become one of the most expensive, upscale locations in the Netherlands. It is home to many art galleries, particularly for modern art, and is also dotted with speciality shops and restaurants. Markets are held regularly at Noordermarkt, the Westerstraat (the Lapjesmarkt textile market) and Lindengracht.

Rembrandt spent the last years of his life in the Jordaan, on the Rozengracht canal. He was buried in the Westerkerk church, at the corner of Rozengracht and Prinsengracht, just beyond the Jordaan. The Anne Frank House, where Anne Frank went into hiding during World War II, is located just beyond the neighborhood, on the east side of the Prinsengracht.

== Origin of the name ==
The most common theory on the origin of the name posits derivation from the French word jardin (meaning garden); indeed, most streets and canals in the Jordaan are named after trees and flowers.

Another theory is that the Prinsengracht canal was once nicknamed after the Jordaan (which is the Dutch name for the river Jordan), and that the neighbourhood beyond the Prinsengracht was so analogized.

== Buildings ==
The Jordaan has a high concentration of hofjes (inner courtyards), many of them with restored houses and peaceful gardens. These courtyards were built by rich people for elderly women, as a kind of charity. By the 1970s most of these courtyards were in very bad condition, like the rest of the neighbourhood. Since then many have been restored and are now inhabited mainly by artists, students and some elderly people. During the summer some of these yards are opened on Sundays during free concerts known as hofjesconcerten.

Many houses in the Jordaan have a stone tablet on their facade, a stone sign displaying the profession or family sign of the inhabitants. For example, a butcher displayed a pig, and a tailor a pair of scissors, carved in stone above the entry. The first such stone tablets were made in the 16th century, when citizens were ordered to use these tablets instead of big wooden gables that obstructed the traffic in the narrow streets.

== History ==
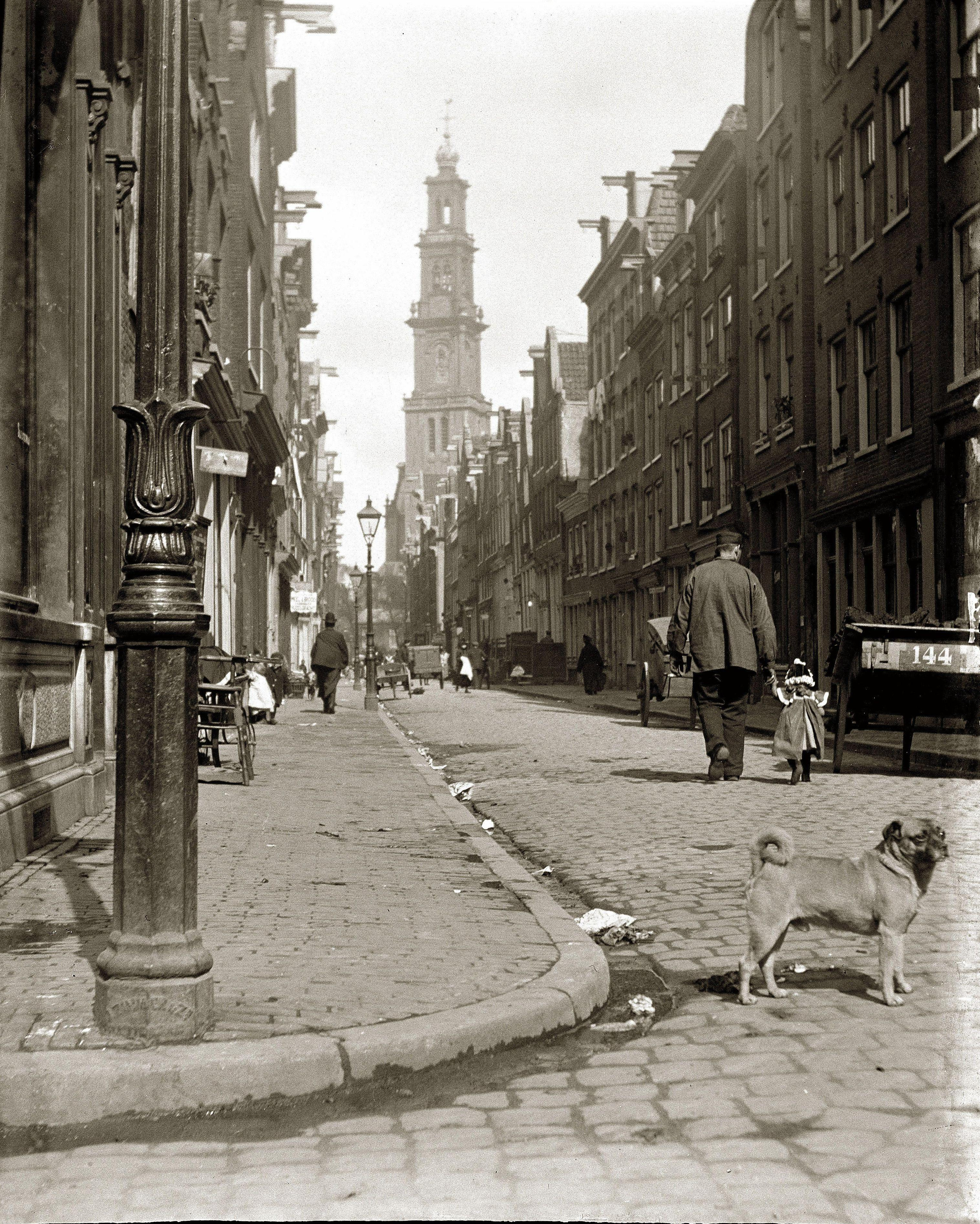
The Bloemstraat in 1902 with the Westertoren

Construction of the Jordaan began in 1612, when it was called Het Nieuwe Werck (The New Work). The streets and canals were built according to the old ditches and paths, which explains its unusual orientation compared to the rest of the city. In the 19th century, six of the Jordaan's canals were filled in, including the Rozengracht.

The neighbourhood was traditionally a leftwing stronghold, with a stormy history. Heavy riots broke out in 1835, 1886, 1917 and 1934. The February strike of 1941 started with meetings on Noordermarkt square.

The Jordaan had a lively music scene in the 20th century. Several of the most popular musicians now have a statue in their memory at the corner of Prinsengracht and Elandsgracht. The singer Willy Alberti is commemorated with a memorial plaque on the Westerkerk church. The Jordaanfestival, celebrating the neighbourhood's music tradition, is held annually.

Starting in the 1960s, many of the neighbourhood's original working-class residents moved out of the city to more affordable locations, mainly to Almere and Purmerend.

== Gallery ==
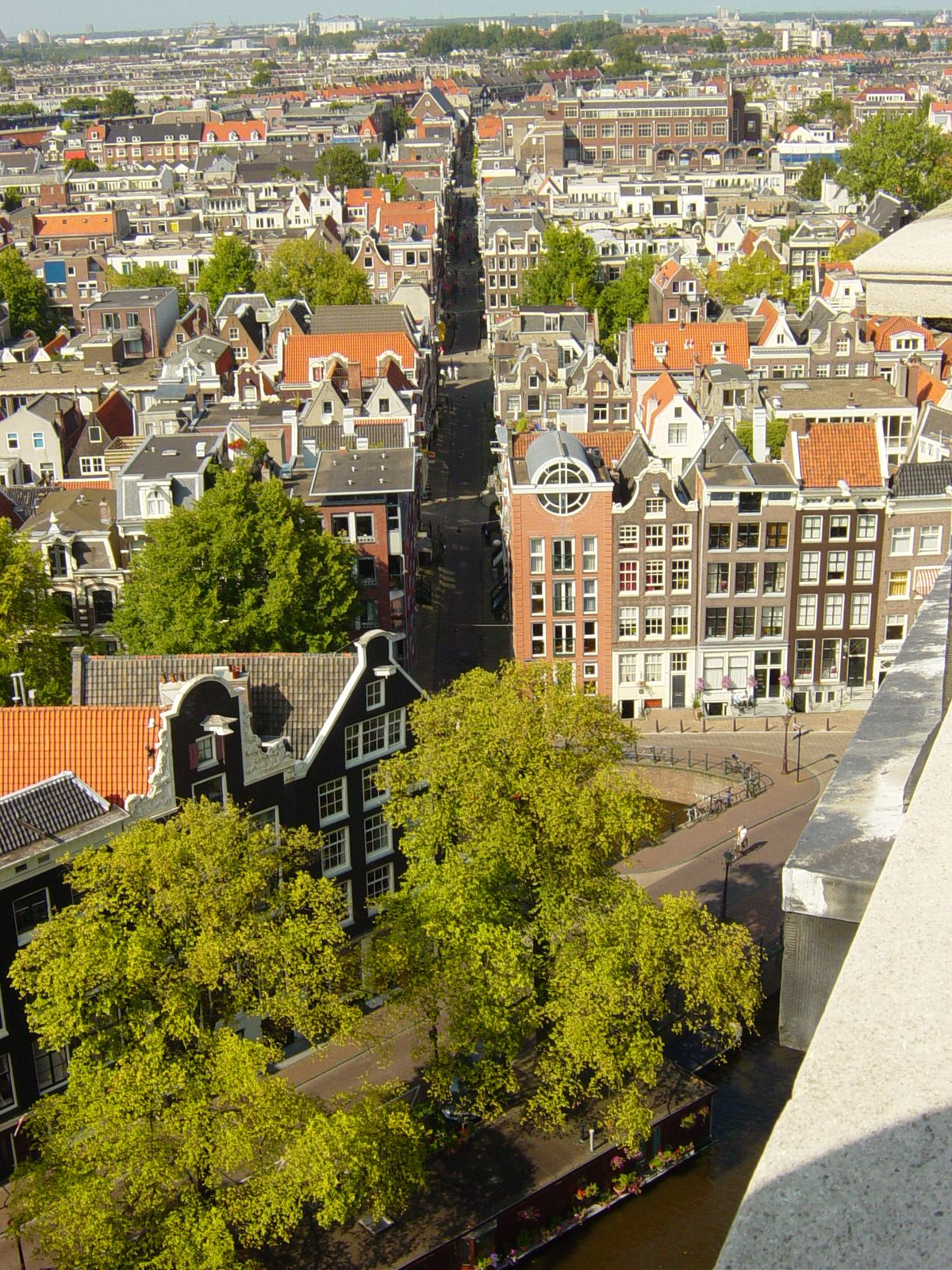
The Jordaan seen from the Westerkerk

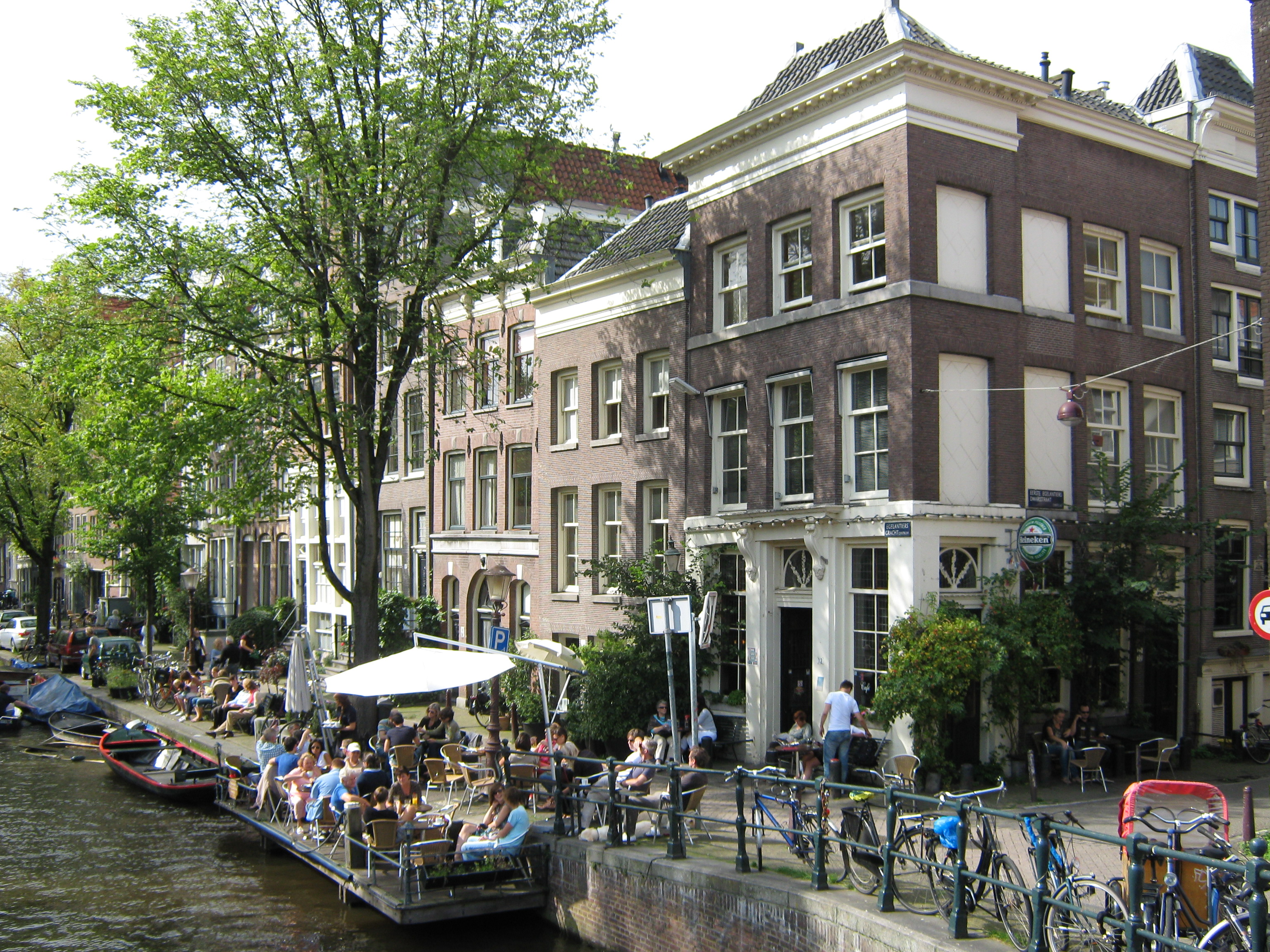
The Eerste Leliedwarsstraat with a view of the Westerkerk

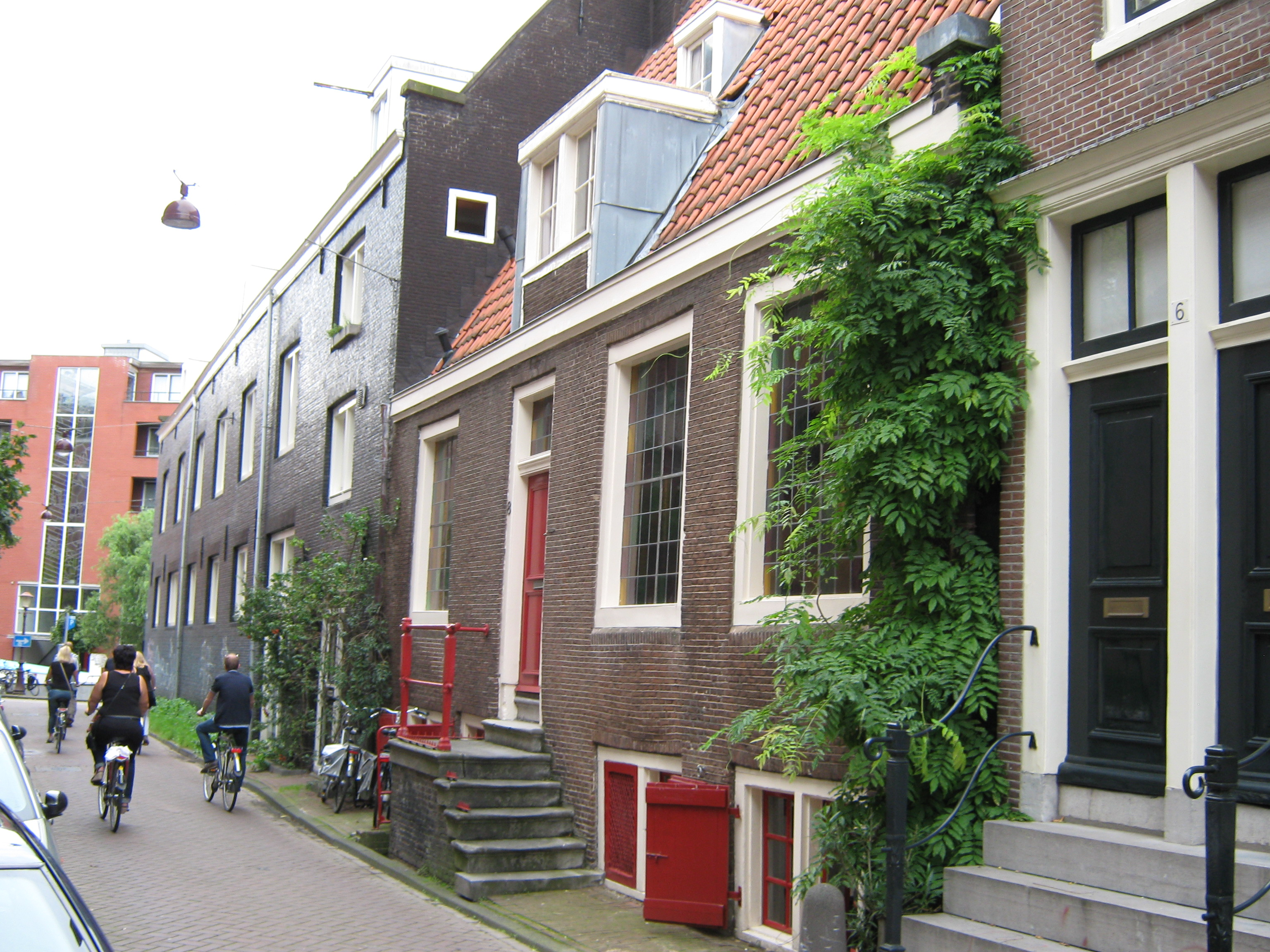
The Gietersstraat

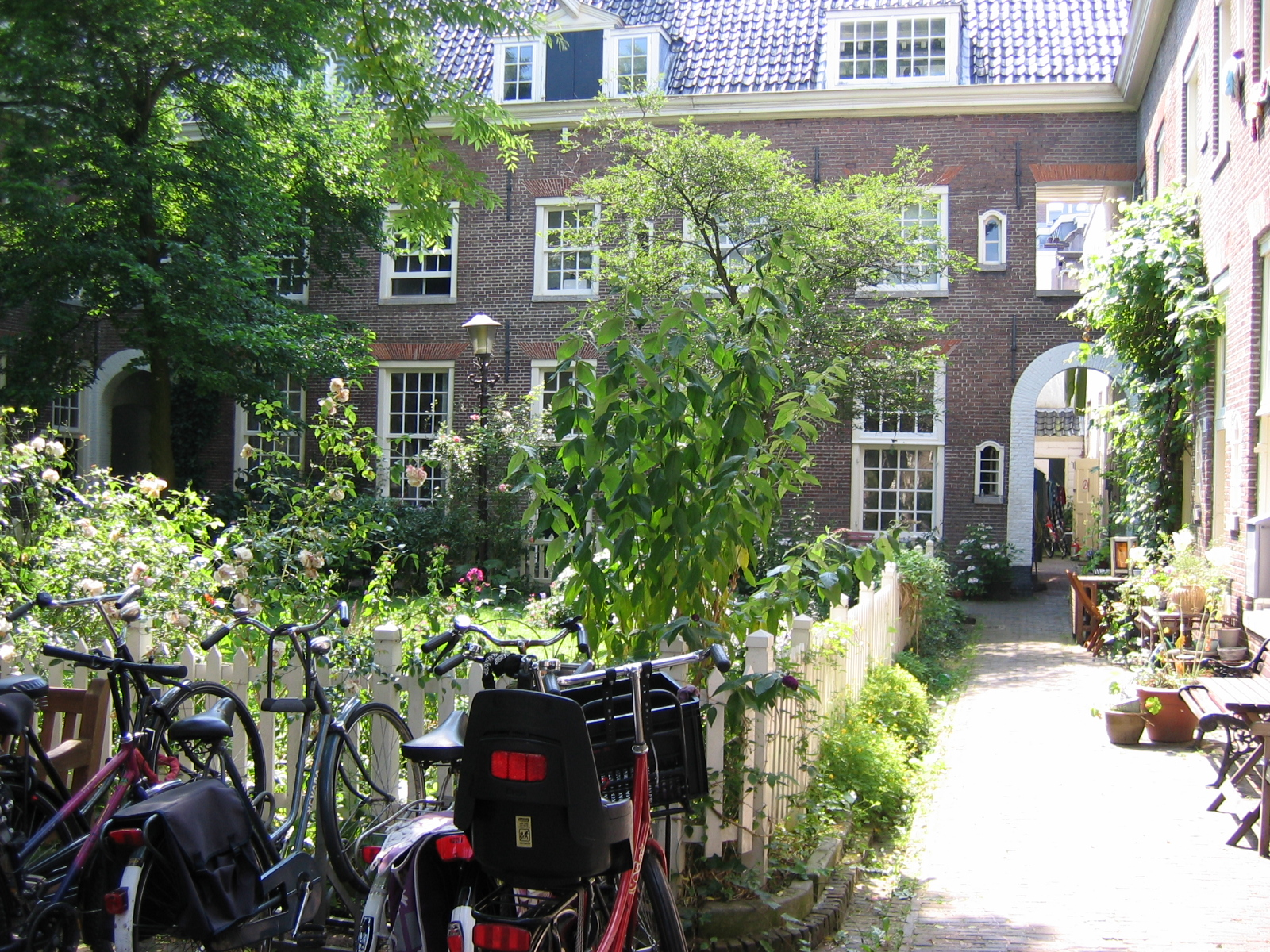
Huiszitweduwenhof built in 1650, now social housing

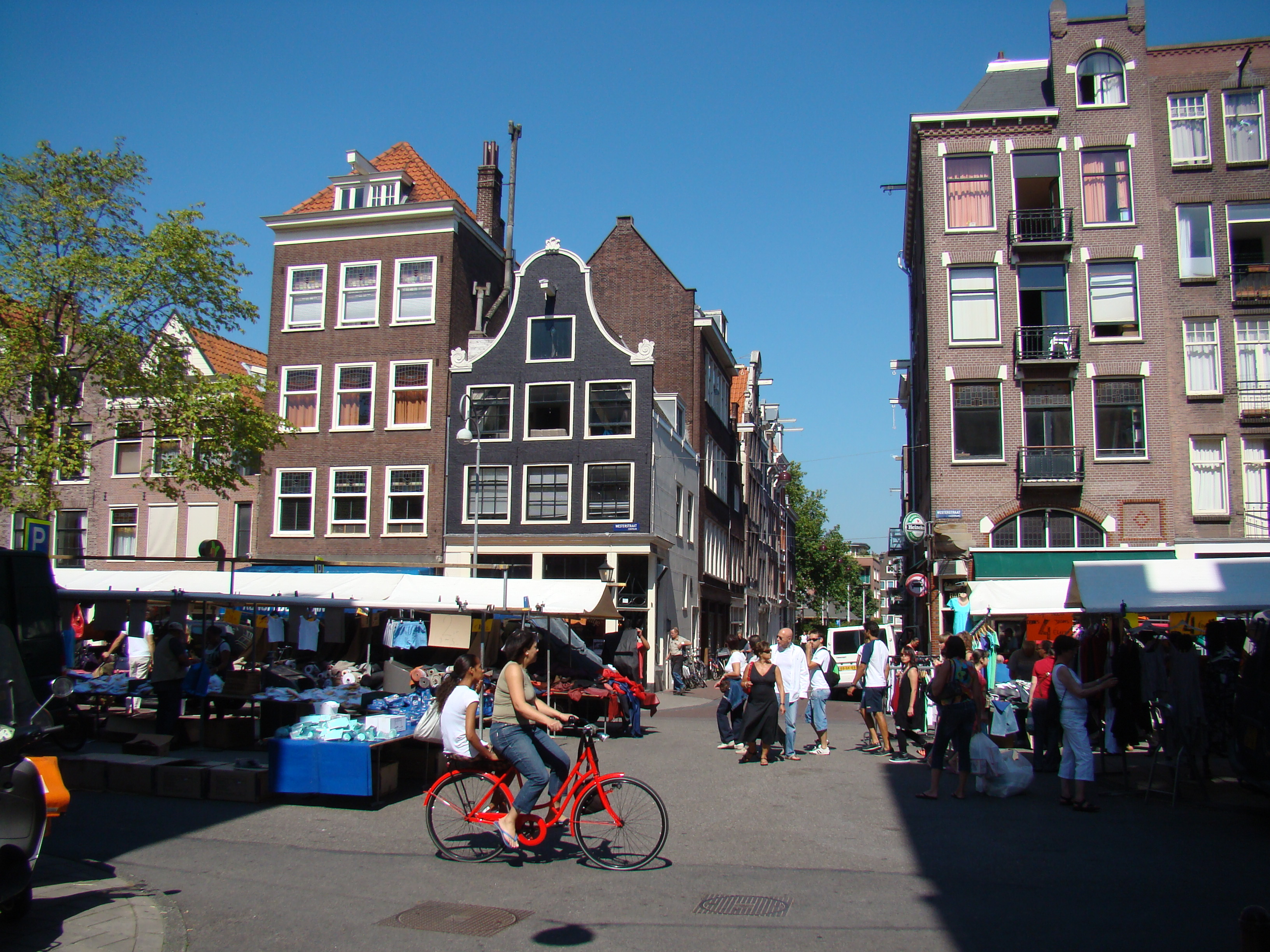
Market in the Westerstraat

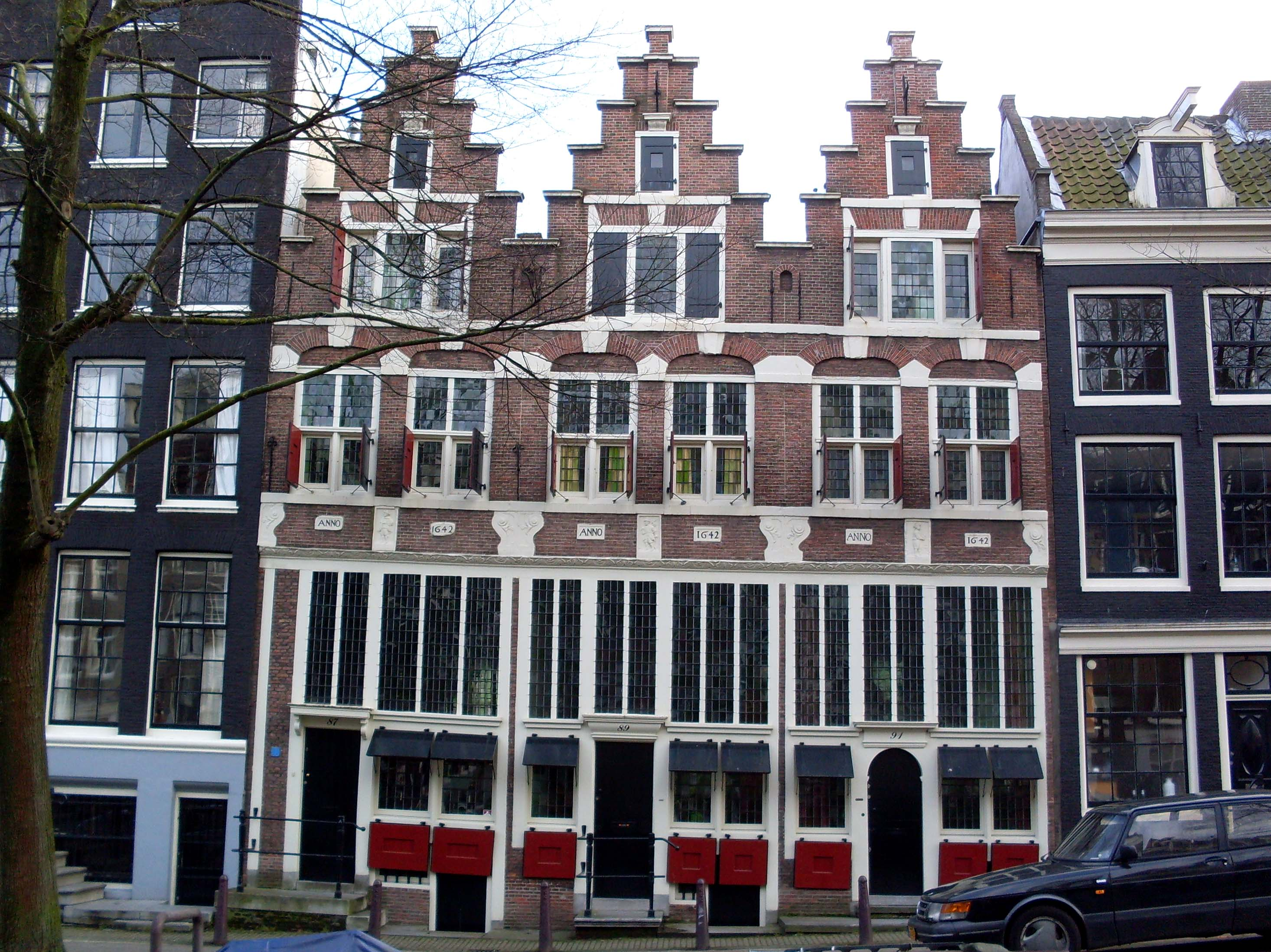
Example of what the houses looked like in the 17th century. The three buildings Bloemgracht 87, 89 and 91 have been restored to their original state.
