= Clarke v. Oregon Health Sciences University =

- Court: Oregon Supreme Court
- Full case name: Jordaan Michael Clarke, a minor, by his guardian ad litem, Sari Clarke, Respondent on Review, v. Oregon Health Sciences University, a public corporation; Mustafa Adnan Cobanoglu, M.D.; John David Blizzard, M.D.; Sanjeev K. Sharma, M.D.; Steven A. Fiamengo, M.D.; Betsy E. Soifer, M.D.; Jennifer Stewart, R.R.T., and Ana Wilson, R.N., Petitioners on Review, and Veerappa K.M. Reddy, M.D., Defendant, and State of Oregon, Intervenor on Review.
- Decided: December 28, 2007
- Citation: 175 P.3d 418; 343 Or. 581

Case history
- Appealed from: Multnomah County Circuit Court; Oregon Court of Appeals

Court membership
- Judges sitting: Paul J. De Muniz, W. Michael Gillette, Robert D. Durham, Thomas A. Balmer, Rives Kistler, Martha Lee Walters (Note: Justice Virginia Linder did not take part in the case.)

Case opinions
- Decision by: De Muniz
- Concurrence: Balmer, Kistler

Clarke v. OHSU, 343 Or. 581, 175 P.3d 418 (2007), was a 2007 decision of the Oregon Supreme Court interpreting Oregon law on the potential tort liability of public employees.

== Background ==
The plaintiff, Jordaan Michael Clarke, underwent successful heart surgery as an infant in 1998 at Oregon Health Sciences University (now Oregon Health and Science University, or OHSU) hospital, but suffered prolonged oxygen deprivation causing permanent and profound brain damage. His parents sued OHSU and the individuals treating him (several doctors, a respiratory therapist, and a nurse) on his behalf, seeking damages in excess of $17 million: $11,073,506 for lifetime medical and life care, $1,200,000 for lost earning capacity, and $5,000,000 for non-economic damages.

The trial court granted judgment on the pleadings on OHSU's motion. OHSU did not dispute negligence and argued that the statutory liability limits for suits against state agencies applied. Clarke was awarded a total of $100,000 economic damages and $100,000 non-economic damages in accordance with the limits.

In 2006, the Oregon Court of Appeals reversed the trial court's ruling, holding that as to the individual defendants, the combination of applying the damage limits to claims against OHSU and allowing this substitution to supersede Clarke's common law claims against the individual defendants, resulting in an award of less than two percent of Clarke's damages, was not a sufficiently substantial substitution of remedies. Therefore, the court held, the limits violated a provision in the Oregon Constitution that "every man shall have remedy by due course of law for injury done him in his person, property, or reputation." The Court of Appeals also held that the limits could constitutionally be applied to Clarke's claims against OHSU, reasoning that OHSU, as a public corporation, would have been entitled to governmental immunity from suit prior to enactment of the statute.

== Oregon Supreme Court decision ==
OHSU and the individual defendants requested discretionary review by the Oregon Supreme Court, and Clarke requested review of the Court of Appeals' ruling that the limits applied to OHSU. The Supreme Court granted the petitions for review, and, on December 27, 2007, affirmed the ruling of the Court of Appeals. The only significant distinction between the reasoning of the Court of Appeals and the Supreme Court is that the Supreme Court did not directly base its ruling of insufficiency of the remedy against the individual defendants on the ratio of the limits. Instead, it held that the elimination of claims against the individual defendants, when coupled with the limited remedy against OHSU, resulted in "an emasculated version of the remedy that was available at common law." As a result, the case was remanded to the trial court for further proceedings against the individual defendants.

Justice Balmer, joined by Justice Kistler, issued a concurring opinion to the Supreme Court decision, in which they called for the legislature to increase the statutory limits for damages against the government and indicated that they thought a less disproportionate limit might be constitutional.
