= KDSO (AM) =

- Phoenix, Oregon; United States
- Broadcast area: Medford, Oregon
- Frequency: 1300 kHz
- Branding: The Ace Sports Radio

Programming
- Format: Sports
- Affiliations: VSiN

Ownership
- Owner: theDove Media, Inc.; (Tablerock Sports Network)
- Sister stations: KDOV; KDSO-LD

History
- First air date: 1976 (as KRVB)
- Former call signs: KRVB (1976–1980); KHUG (1980–1990); KDOV (1990–1995); KAPL (1995–2022)

Technical information
- Licensing authority: FCC
- Facility ID: 17468
- Class: B
- Power: 5,000 watts
- Transmitter coordinates: 42°17′43.5″N 122°48′19.1″W
- Translator: 107.9 K300BE (Ashland)

Links
- Public license information: Public file; LMS
- Webcast: Listen Live
- Website: theacesportsradio.com

KDSO (1300 AM) is a radio station broadcasting a sports format. Licensed to Phoenix, Oregon, in the United States, the station is currently owned by theDove Media, Inc.

== History ==
On March 6, 1995, the station changed its call sign to KAPL.

On October 4, 2022, the station changed its call sign to KDSO.

=== The Ace Sports Radio Era (2023–present) ===
On October 31, 2023, KDSO changed their format from Christian radio to sports, branded as "The Ace Sports Radio" with programming from the VSiN sports betting network. KDSO began simulcasting on translator K300BE 107.9 FM Ashland.

The station format was created by Tablerock Sports owners Joe Brett and Pete Belcastro, broadcast legends from the Southern Oregon region, and is the new home of The Rich Eisen Show and The Bald Faced Truth with John Canzano.

== Broadcast Schedule ==
As of January 2024

- 12:00am–4:00am The Greg Peterson Experience*
- 4:00am–7:00am Follow The Money*
- 7:00am–9:00am A Numbers Game*
- 9:00am–12:00pm The Rich Eisen Show
- 12:00pm–1:00pm Big Bets*
- 1:00pm–3:00pm Tee It Up Southern Oregon (Hosted by Joe Brett)
- 3:00pm–6:00pm The Bald Faced Truth (Hosted by John Canzano)
- 6:00pm–9:00pm Live Bet Tonight*

VSiN Programming in asterisks
