= Leliegracht =

Canal in Amsterdam

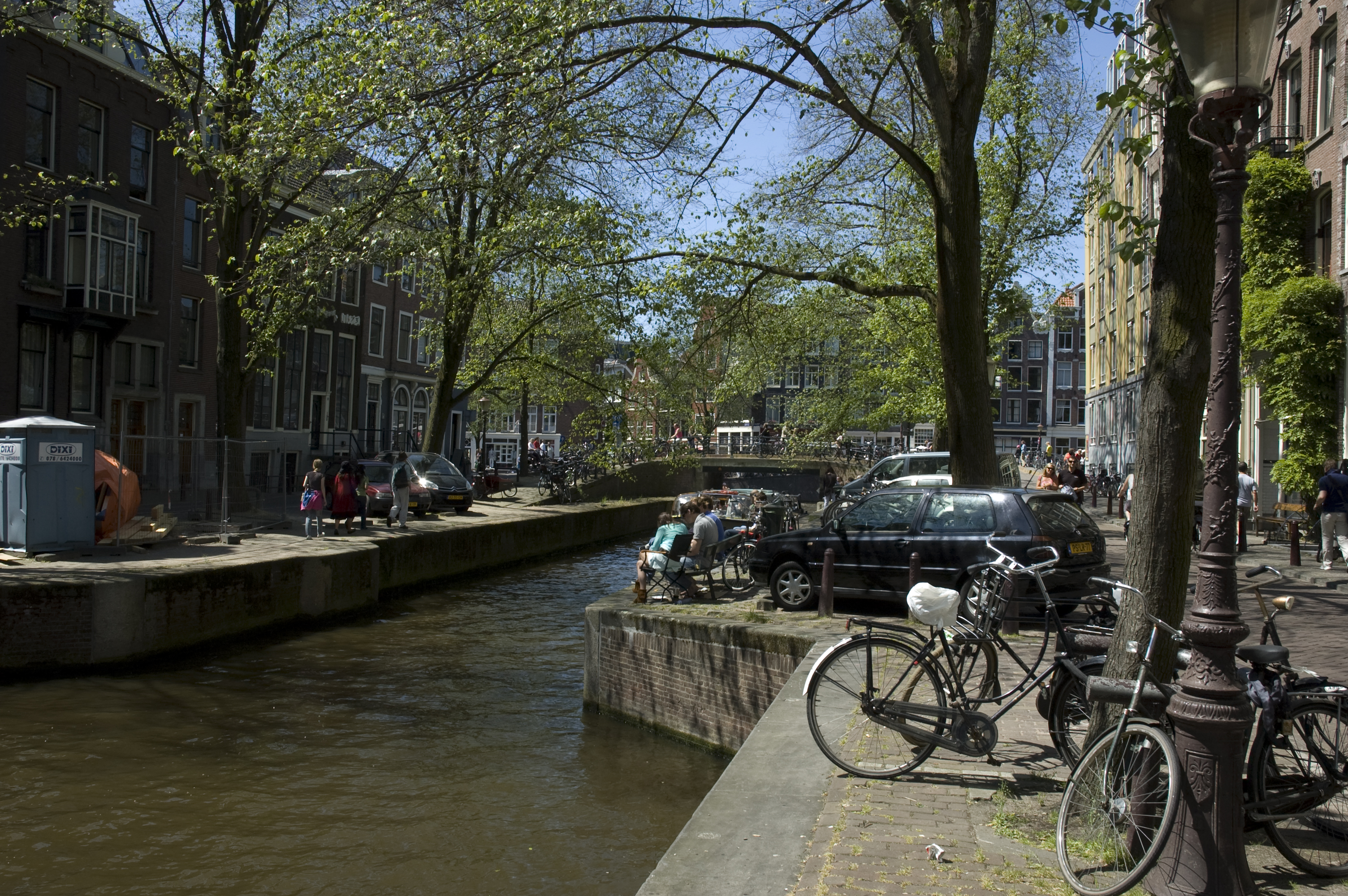

- Location in Jordaan (dark blue)
- Location: Amsterdam
- Postal code: 1015, 1016
- Coordinates: 52.375232°N 4.886421°E
- East end: Herengracht
- To: Prinsengracht

Construction
- Construction start: 17th century

The Leliegracht (Dutch pronunciation: [ˈleːliˌɣrɑxt]; Lily Canal) is a canal in Amsterdam, the Netherlands, between Herengracht (no. 148 and 169) and Prinsengracht (no. 124 and 241). The canal lies within the western Grachtengordel (canal belt) in the Jordaan neighborhood of the Amsterdam-Centrum district.

== History ==
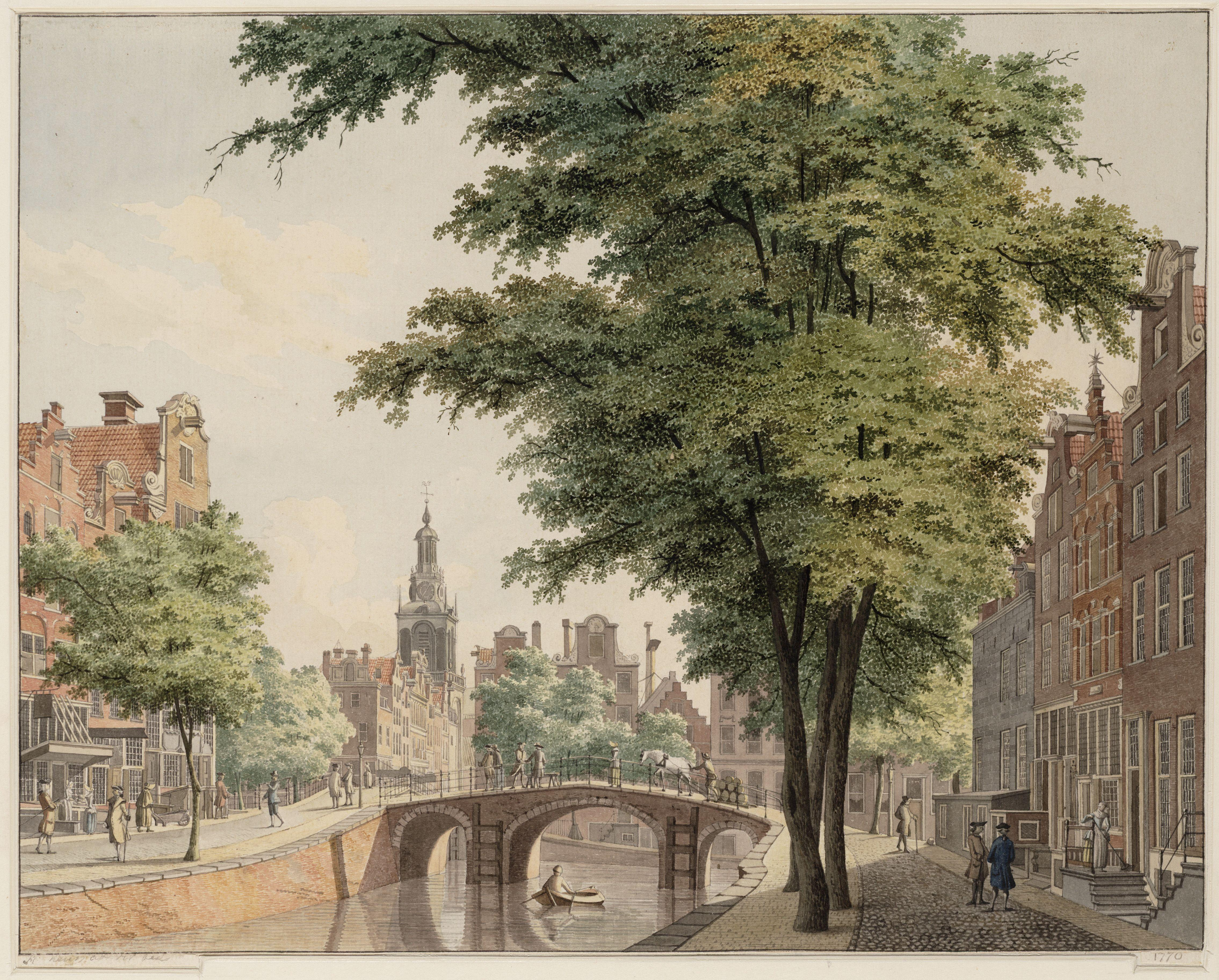
Leliegracht by Hendrik Keun (1738–87)

The canal was dug after 1612 when the canal belt was created south of the Brouwersgracht. The remains of a lock can be recognized on the Prinsengracht side. That lock was necessary because the water of the Prinsengracht (along with the rest of the Jordaan Canals) remained at the polder level, while the water level in the Leliegracht, Keizersgracht and Herengracht was at the higher city level.

Six of the eleven Jordanian canals were filled in in the 19th century. Only the Bloemgracht, Egelantiersgracht, Lauriergracht, Looiersgracht and Passeerdersgracht remained besides the canal belt Prinsengracht, Keizersgracht, Herengracht, Singel, Lijnbaansgracht, Brouwersgracht, Leliegracht and Leidsegracht.

== Architecture ==
- The 'Astoria' building on the corner of the Leliegracht and the Keizersgracht is an example of Art Nouveau architecture. It was built in 1905 by order of the 'Eerste Hollandse Levensverzekerings-Bank' after designs by architects Gerrit van Arkel and Herman Hendrik Baanders.
- Leliegracht 9-11 is a typical example of a 'twin building', with a clock façade in Louis Quinze style. Although it is a twin building, the building at Leliegracht 11 is just a little wider.
- Leliegracht 41-43 (built around 1725) is a twin building with neck gables in Style Louis XIV.
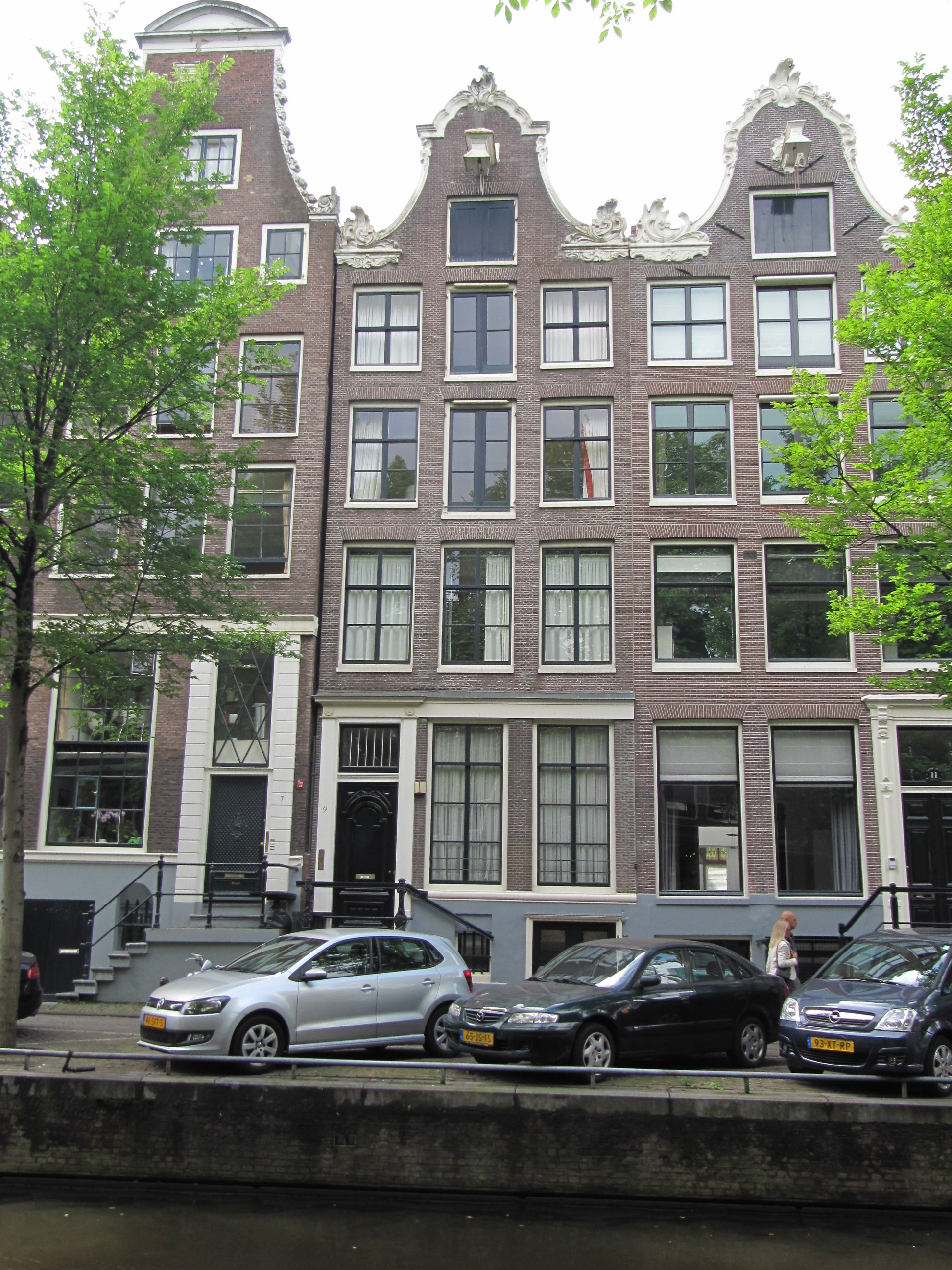
Premises 9 and 11

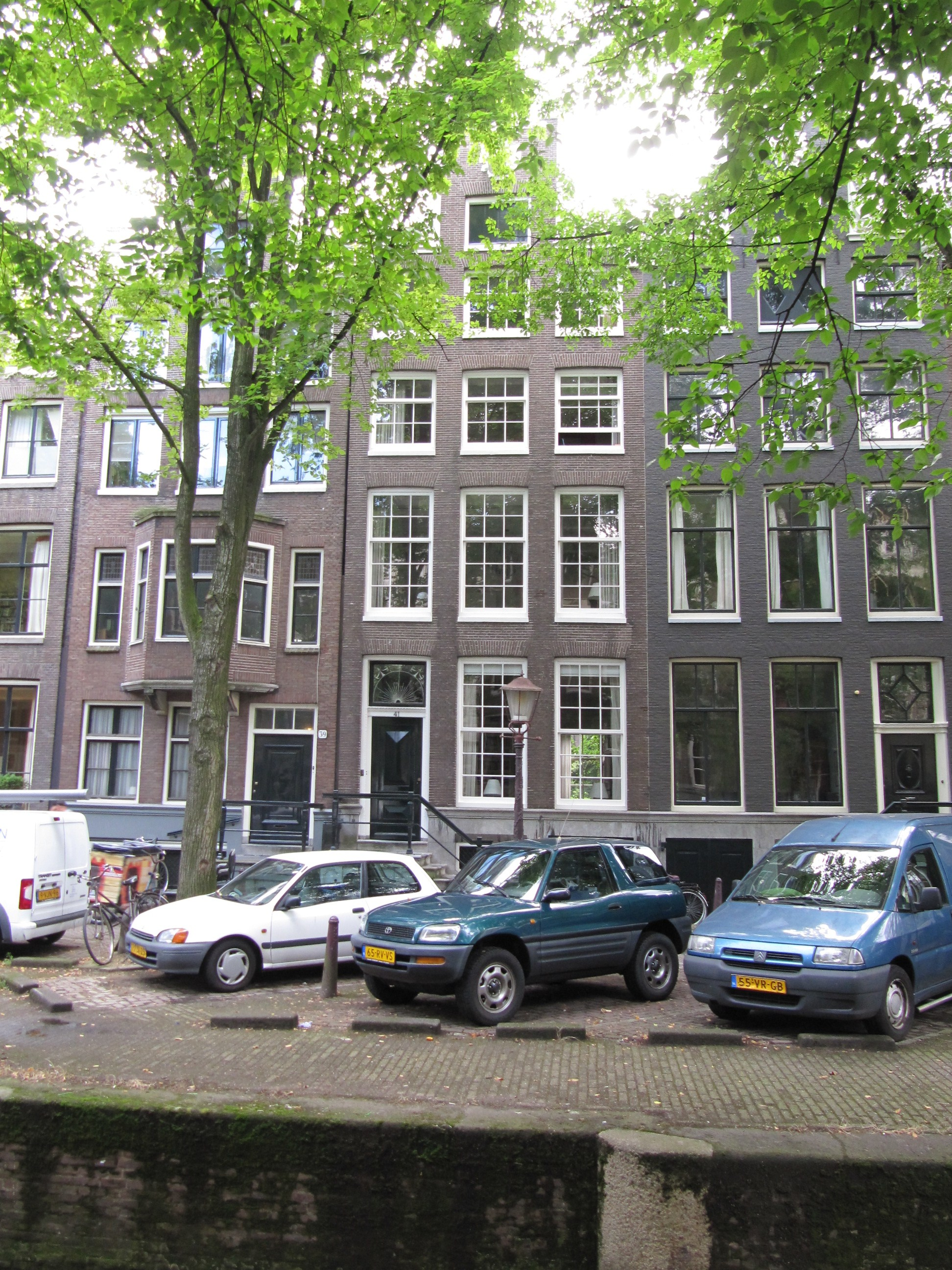
Premises no. 41 and 43

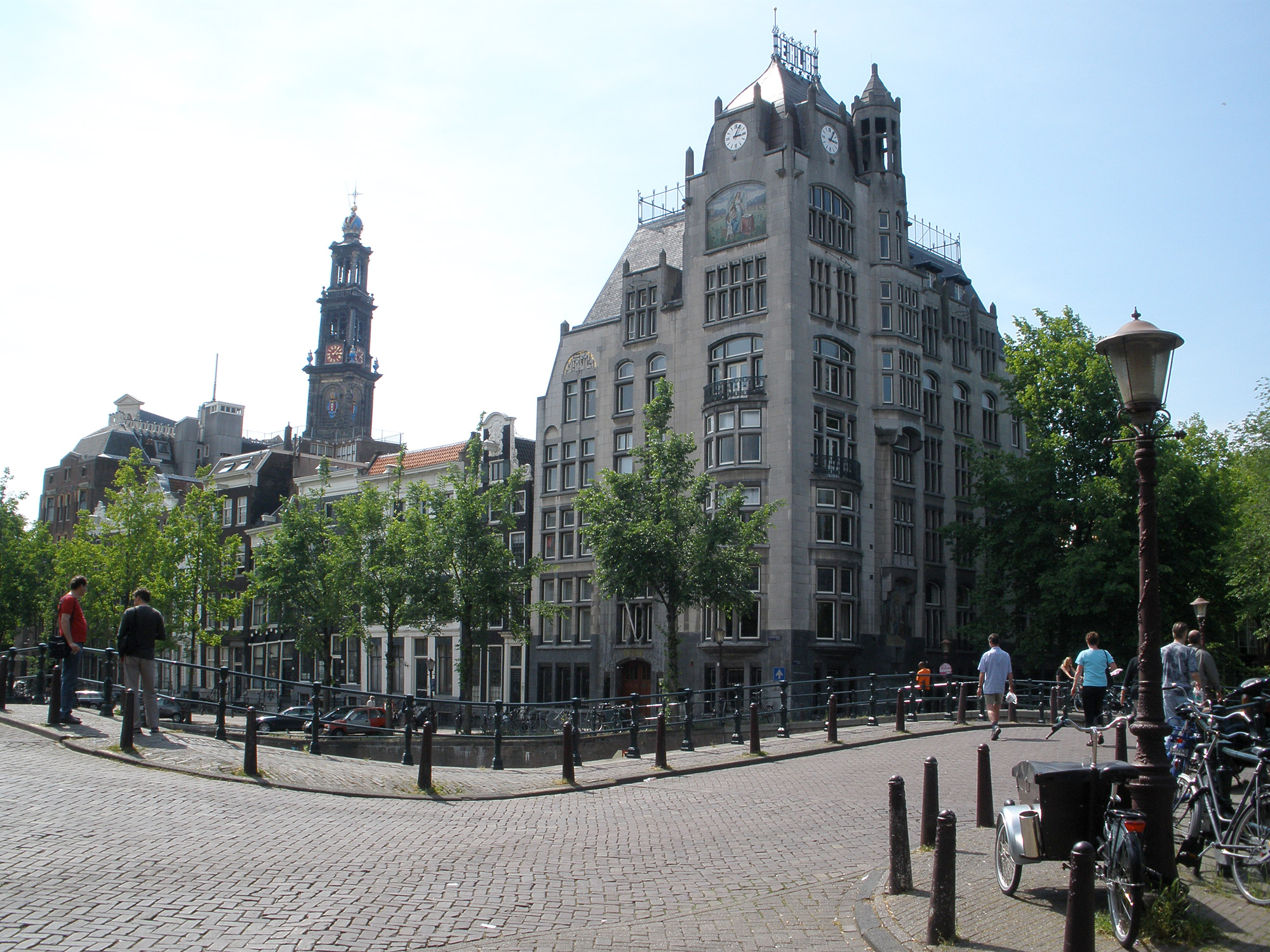
Astoria building on the corner of Leliegracht and Keizersgracht .

== Famous residents ==
- Jan Jacobszoon Hinlopen (1626–66), cloth merchant, shipowner and collector of paintings lived with his brother Jacob for a long time on Leliegracht near the corner with Keizersgracht.
- The writer Everhardus Johannes Potgieter lived at No. 25.

== See also ==
- Canals of Amsterdam

== Sources ==
- Monumenten en archeologie in Amsterdam - Tweelingen
