= Passeerdersgracht =

Canal in Amsterdam

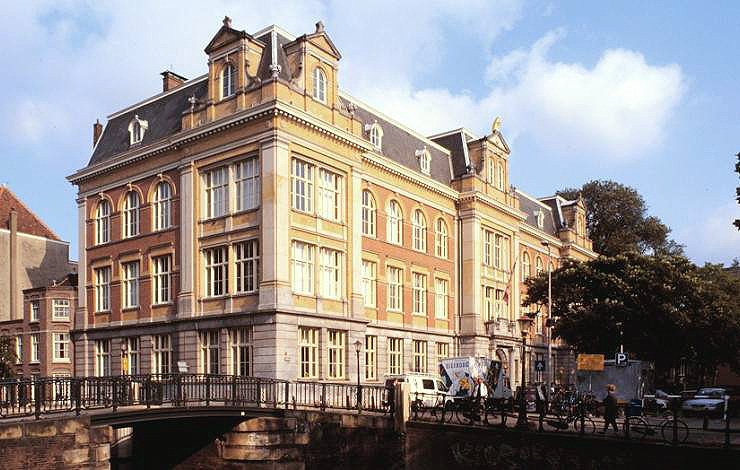
- The old HES building on the corner of Raamplein / Passeerdersgracht

- Location of Passeerdersgracht (dark blue)
- Length: .2 kilometres (0.12 mi)
- Location: Amsterdam
- Postal code: 1016
- Coordinates: 52.367047°N 4.881114°E
- East end: Prinsengracht
- To: Lijnbaansgracht

Construction
- Construction start: 17th century

The Passeerdersgracht is a short canal in Amsterdam, the Netherlands, that connects the Prinsengracht with the Lijnbaansgracht. It is the southernmost canal in the Jordaan neighbourhood, and borders the west part of the Grachtengordel (Canal District).

== Name ==
The Passeerdersgracht is named after a passeerderij, an old name for a workshop where Spanish leather was manufactured and processed.

== History ==
The canal originated when the canal belt was dug south from the Brouwersgracht starting in 1612. In the 19th century. six of the eleven Jordaan canals were filled in. Only the Bloemgracht, Egelantiersgracht, Lauriergracht, Looiersgracht and Passeerdersgracht remained, connecting to the Prinsengracht, Keizersgracht, Herengracht, Singel, Lijnbaansgracht, Brouwersgracht, Leliegracht and Leidsegracht.

The former Hogeschool voor Economische Studies (School of Economic Studies; HES) / First Public Trade School on the corner of Passeerdersgracht, is located on a filled-in part of Lijnbaansgracht: the Raamplein.

In many places in the Jordaan there were so-called gangen, alleys or corridors between the houses. These narrow alleys gave access to rear areas that held courtyards where the less fortunate lived in often dilapidated shelters, often built illegally. For example, in the "Walenhoek" on the Passeerdersgracht there was the "Walengang" between numbers 15 and 17. This corridor was demolished in 1850 for construction of the former Toevlugt voor Behoeftigen on Passeerdersgracht 9–19.

The building of the former Arbeidsbeurs on Passeerdersgracht 28-32, at the corner of Tweede Passeerdersdwarsstraat, was designed around 1915 by architects Joan van der Mey and Piet Kramer. Until the summer of 2012, this monumental building housed one of the two branches of the Amsterdam youth circus Circus Elleboog. Elleboog then moved to a new location, Laan van Spartaan in Amsterdam-West.

Most of the canal houses on the Passeerdersgracht have been converted into residential houses.

== Trivia ==
In the book Rood paleis (Red Palace) by Ferdinand Bordewijk there is a brothel on the center of Passeerdersgracht, just before the outbreak of World War I.

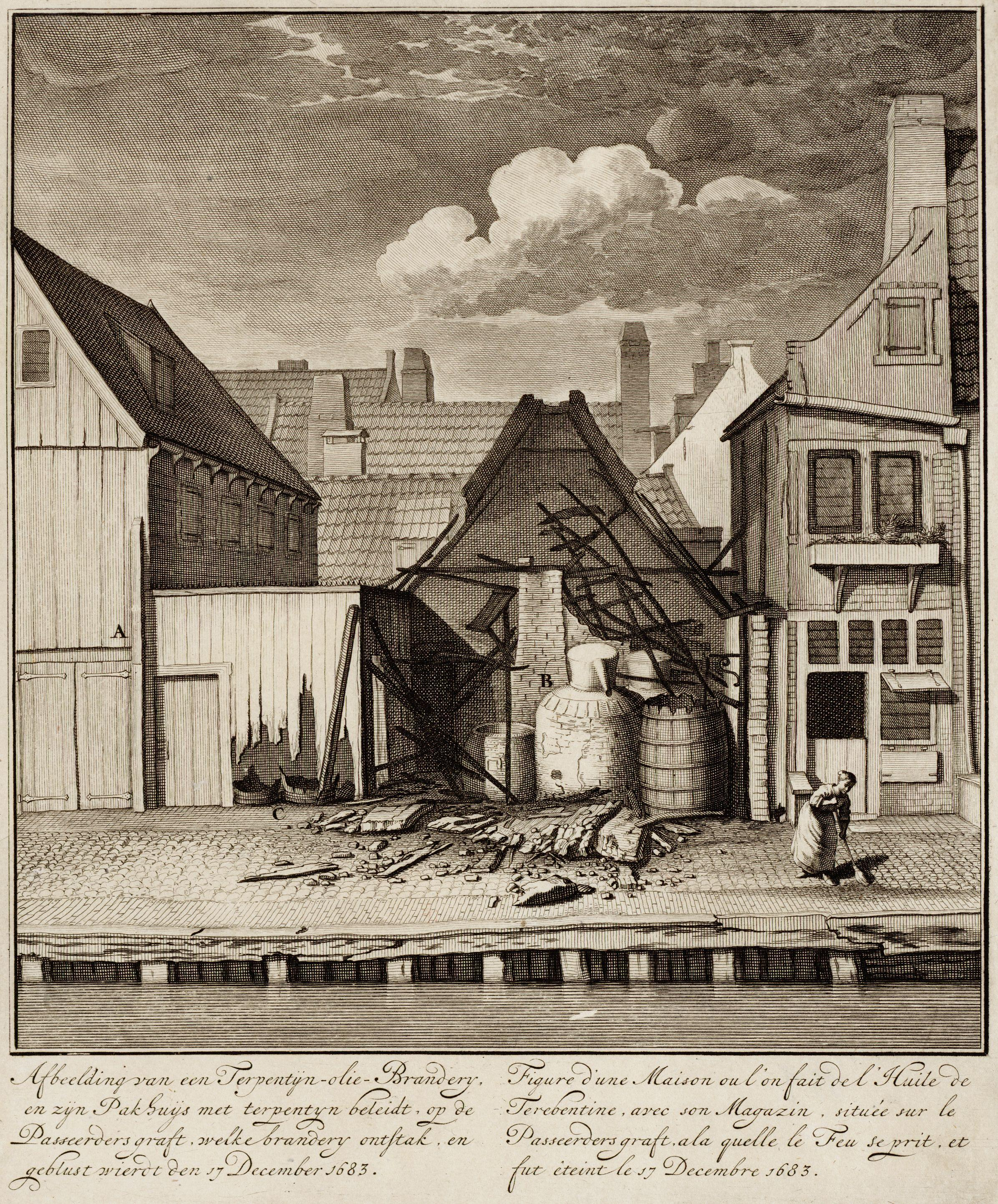
A partially burned down turpentine oil burner on the Passeerdersgracht (1690)

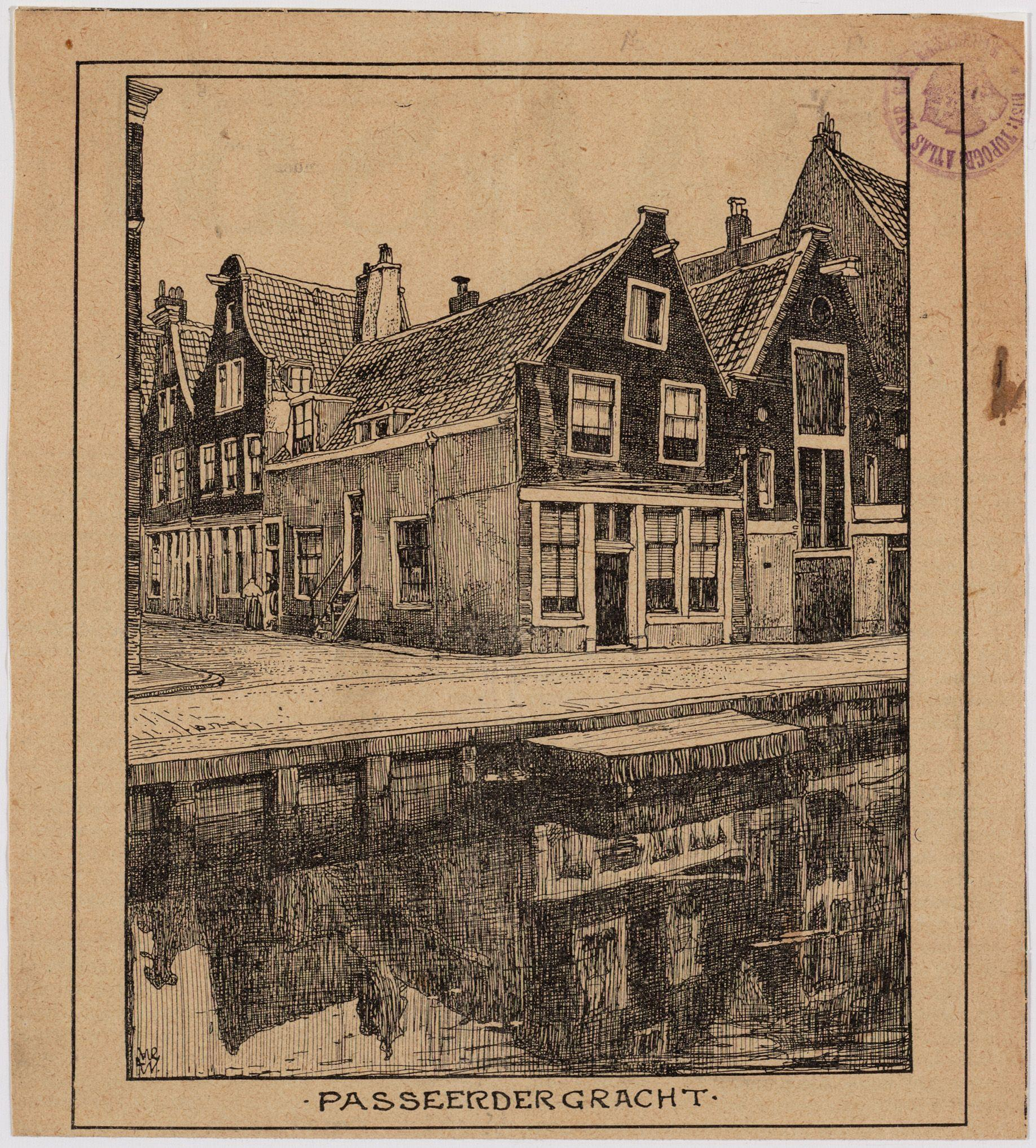
Passeerdersgracht 12–16 (1898)

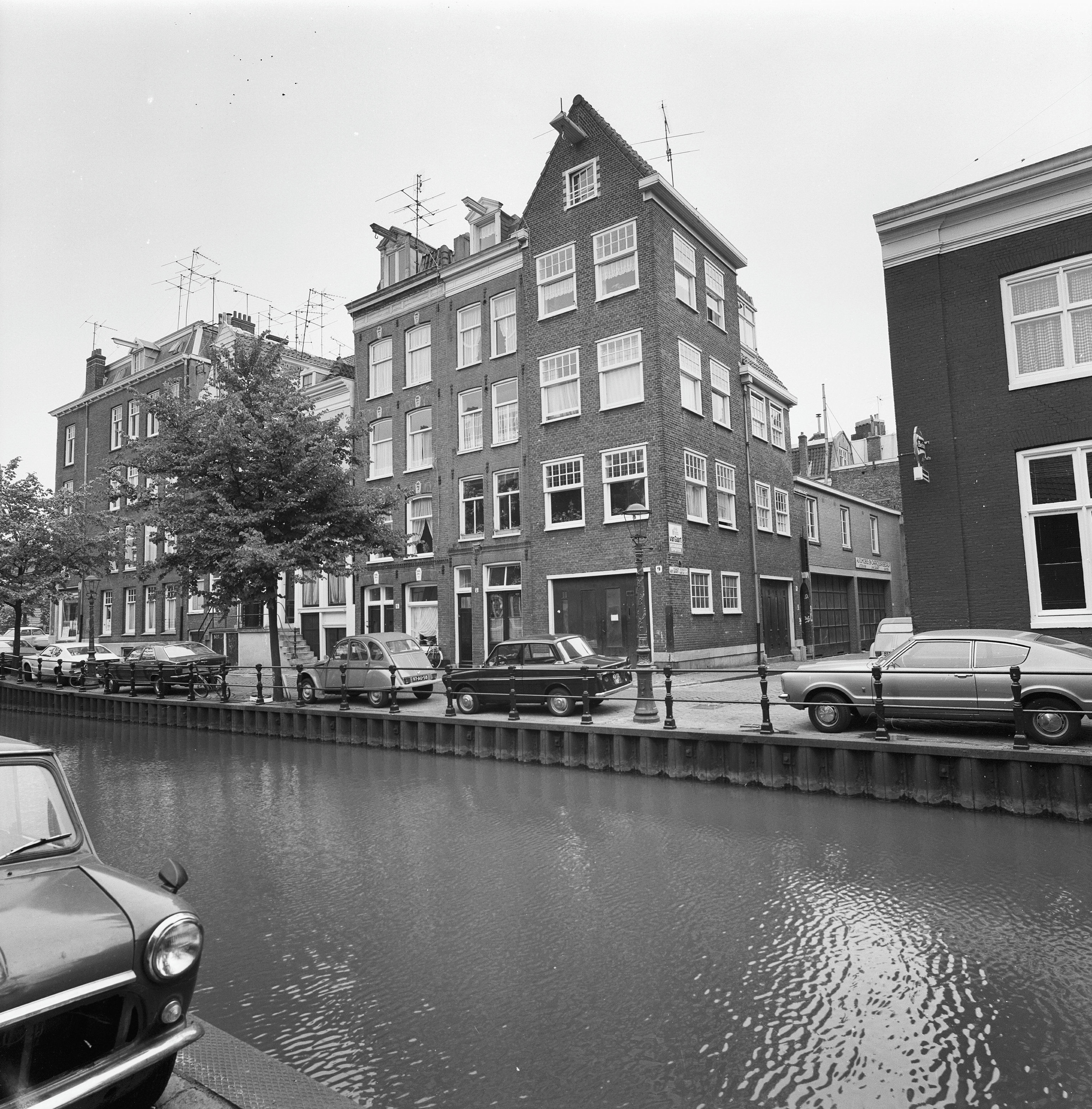
Passeerdersgracht 7-9 (1975)

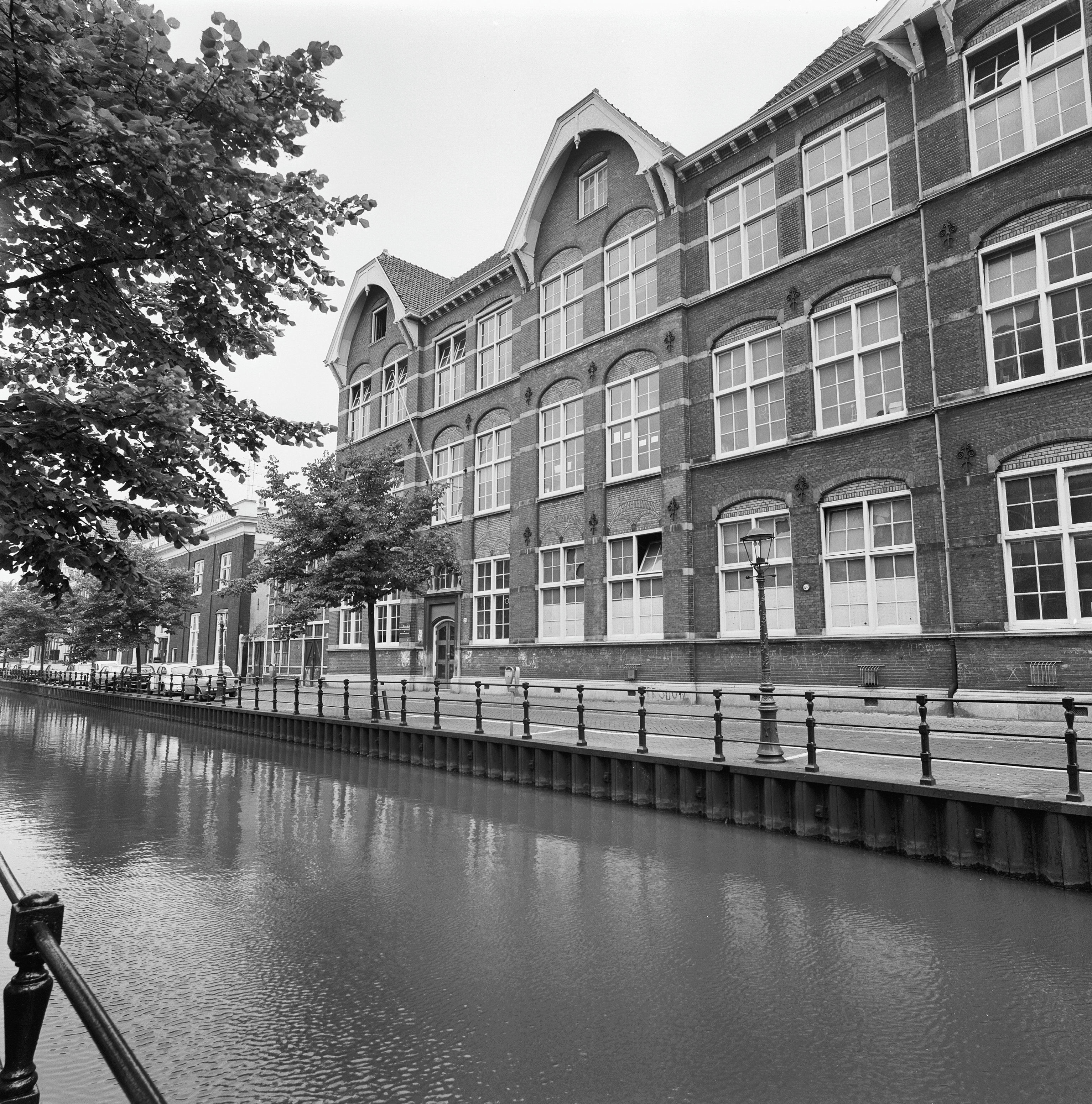
Passeerdersgracht 23 (1975)

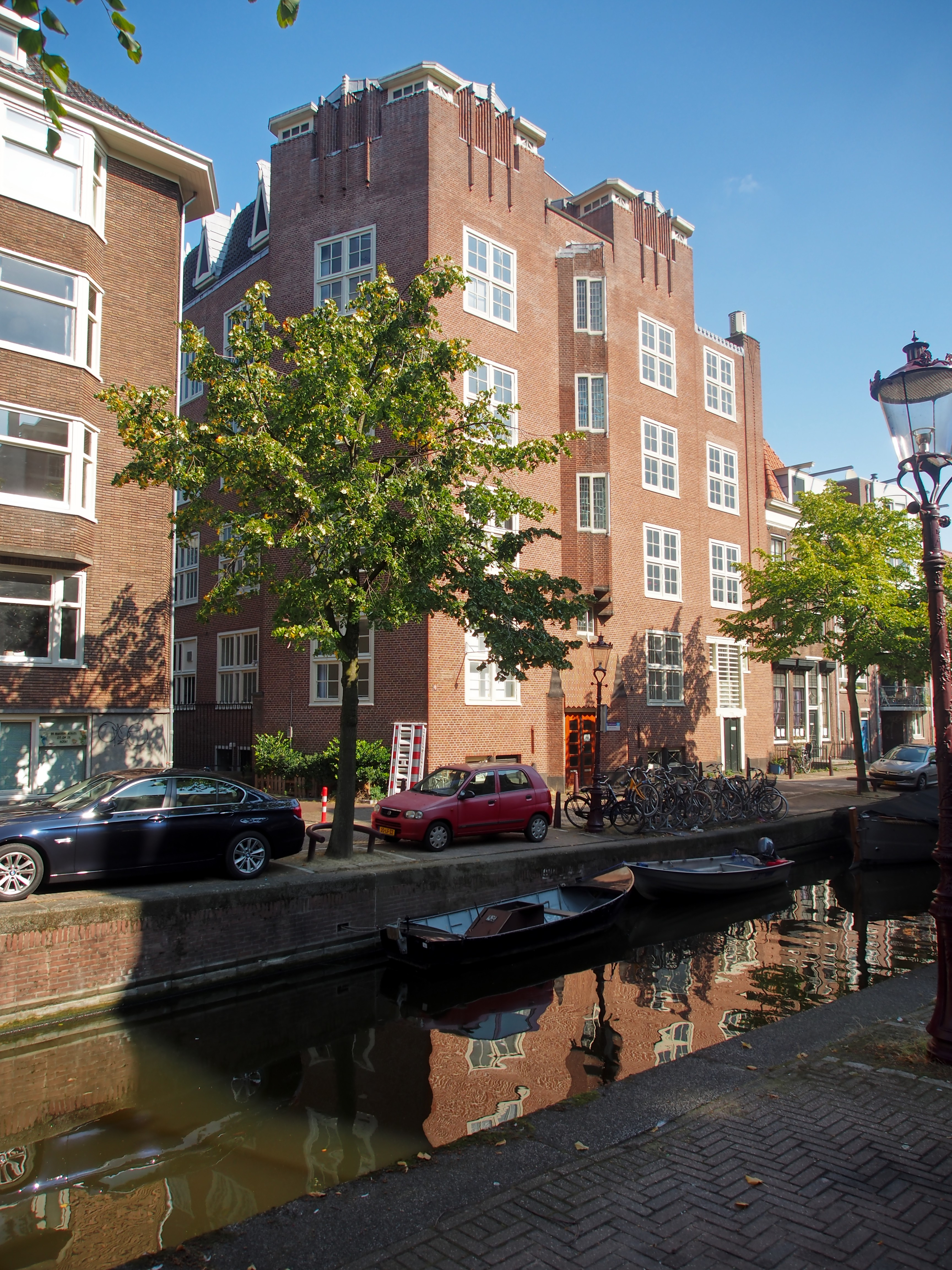
Passeerdersgracht 32 (2017)

== See also ==
- Canals of Amsterdam
