= Bloemgracht =

Canal in Amsterdam

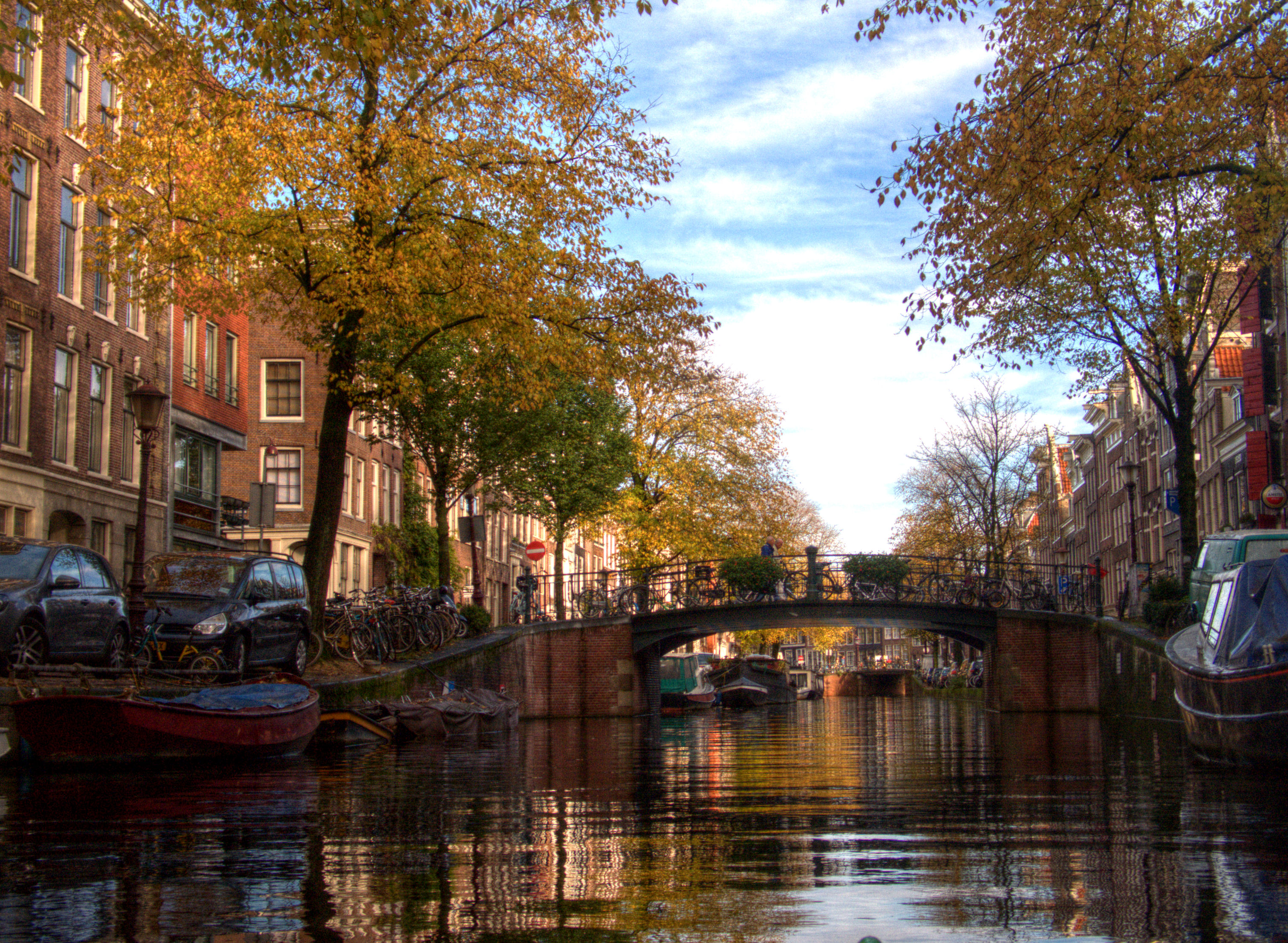
- The Rosa Overbeekbrug, a bridge over the Bloemgracht, November 2012

- Location of Bloemgracht (dark blue)
- Length: .47 kilometres (0.29 mi)
- Location: Amsterdam
- Postal code: 1015, 1016
- Coordinates: 52.374572°N 4.880153°E
- East end: Prinsengracht
- To: Lijnbaansgracht

Construction
- Construction start: 17th century

The Bloemgracht (Dutch pronunciation: [ˈblumˌɣrɑxt]) is a canal in the Jordaan district of Amsterdam, the Netherlands. It connects the Prinsengracht with the Lijnbaansgracht and runs between and parallel to Nieuwe Leliestraat and Bloemstraat in the Amsterdam-Centrum district. The canal is named after the bulwark "de Bloem", later called "Rijkeroord". From 1614 a windmill was located here, but it was moved to Haarlemmerweg in 1878.

== History ==
The Bloemgracht was constructed in the first half of the 17th century as part of the Jordaan during one of the major Amsterdam city expansions; the so-called Third Expansion. Initially, dyers were established on and near the Bloemgracht. The Calkoen family in particular was active here.

Willem Blaeu started his cartography workshop here in 1635, and it was continued by his son Joan Blaeu and his grandson Joan Junior until 1698. The Atlas Maior or Grooten Atlas by Blaeu was made on the Bloemgracht. The company was initially located on the corner of Bloemgracht / Tweede Leliedwarsstraat and later on the corner of Derde Leliedwarsstraat. In 1696 the company was dissolved. Bridge no. 120 across the Bloemgracht at the corner of the Derde Leliedwarsstraat was given the name Atlas Bridge.

The painter Rembrandt van Rijn, who lived at Rozengracht, is supposed to have had a studio on the Bloemgracht in the 1660s.

Fourteen sugar factories were active on the canal in the 18th and 19th century.

Six of the eleven Jordaan canals were filled in during the 19th century. The Bloemgracht, Egelantiersgracht, Lauriergracht, Looiersgracht and Passeerdersgracht remained as water connections between the Prinsengracht and the Lijnbaansgracht.

From 1856, the type foundry of the graphic trading house of Nicolaas Tetterode was at the Bloemgracht 134-136. There was also the Reformed Christian School, where Jan Ligthart taught, among others.

As stated on the plaque on the facade of Bloemgracht 24, the Vereniging Hulp Voor Onbehuisden (Help for the Homeless Association) managed a night shelter here for women and children between 1904 and 1945. The Catholic Society of Saint Vincent de Paul ran a food kitchen on Bloemgracht 146, and the St. Vincentius Intermediate School was at number 150. The "Old Papers" charity work project was in a basement at number 67. The Nederlandsche Zondagsschool Vereniging (a Sunday School) was established from 1937 at Bloemgracht 79 and from 1973 at number 65. Disputes within the Restored Apostolic Mission Church - Stam Juda at Bloemgracht 98 were much in the news in the 1970s. From 1958 to 1966 the Pacifist Socialist Party (PSP), which was dissolved in 1991, had its office at Bloemgracht 55 The Hollandia rye bread factory was located at Bloemgracht 178. There is a paint factory at Bloemgracht 191.

After World War II, when most of the factories had left, the Bloemgracht became more residential-oriented. In addition to expensive canal houses and apartments, it held restaurants and galleries. Characteristically it has some very large canal houses and also very small ones. The Bloemgracht is described in various travel guides as one of the most beautiful canals of the Jordaan.

The writer Mies Bouhuys said about the Jordaan and the Bloemgracht: "The Jordaan canon starts in 1613, with the construction of the ring of canals. The wealthy lived on the Bloemgracht, the most prestigious canal in the Jordaan. The common people lived in the (cross) streets." The educational innovator Jan Ligthart described life on the Bloemgracht extensively in his books.

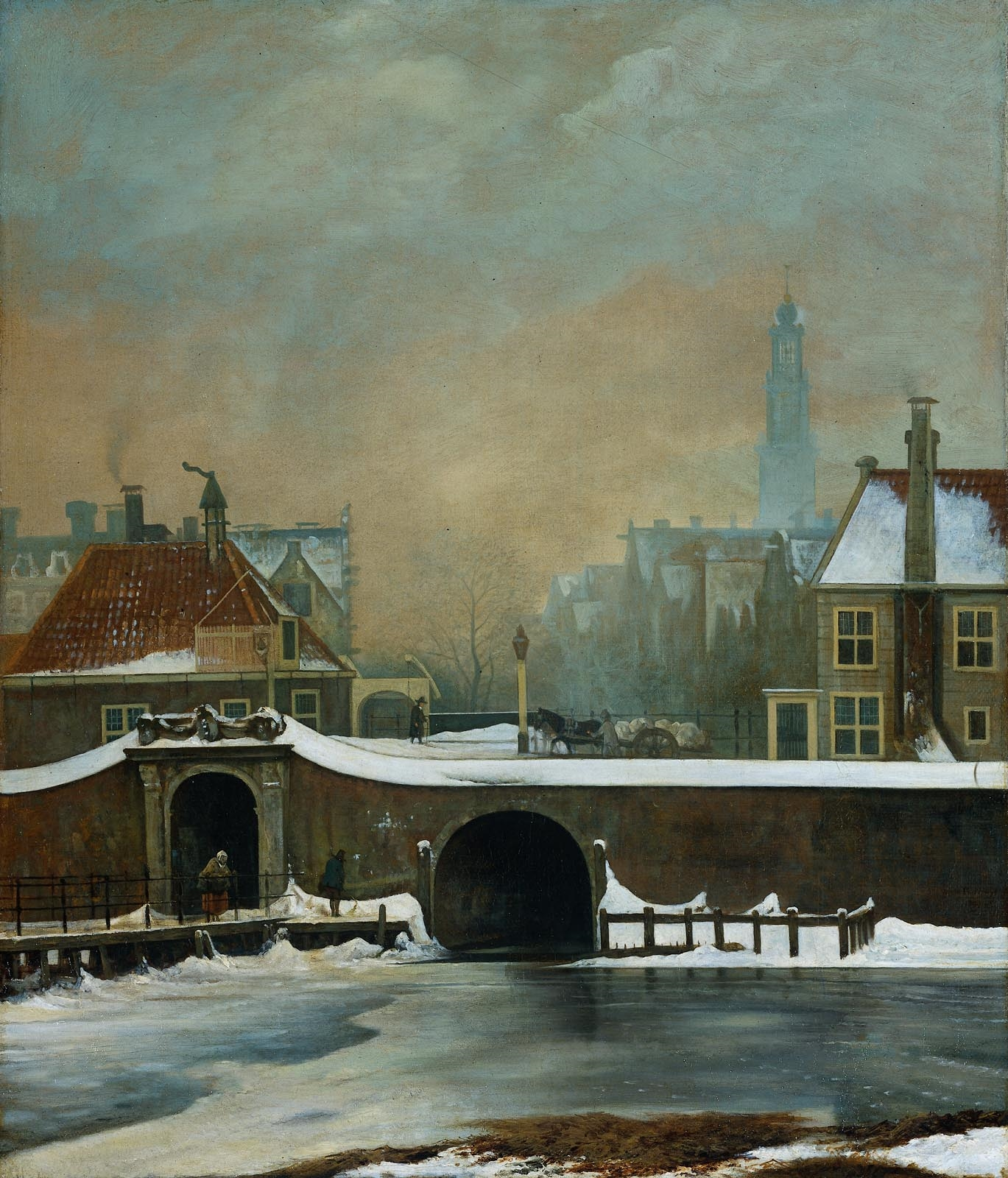
In the painting Het Raampoortje from 1809 by Wouter Johannes van Troostwijk ( Rijksmuseum Amsterdam collection ) one can see the Raampoort, at the time a passage in the old city wall.

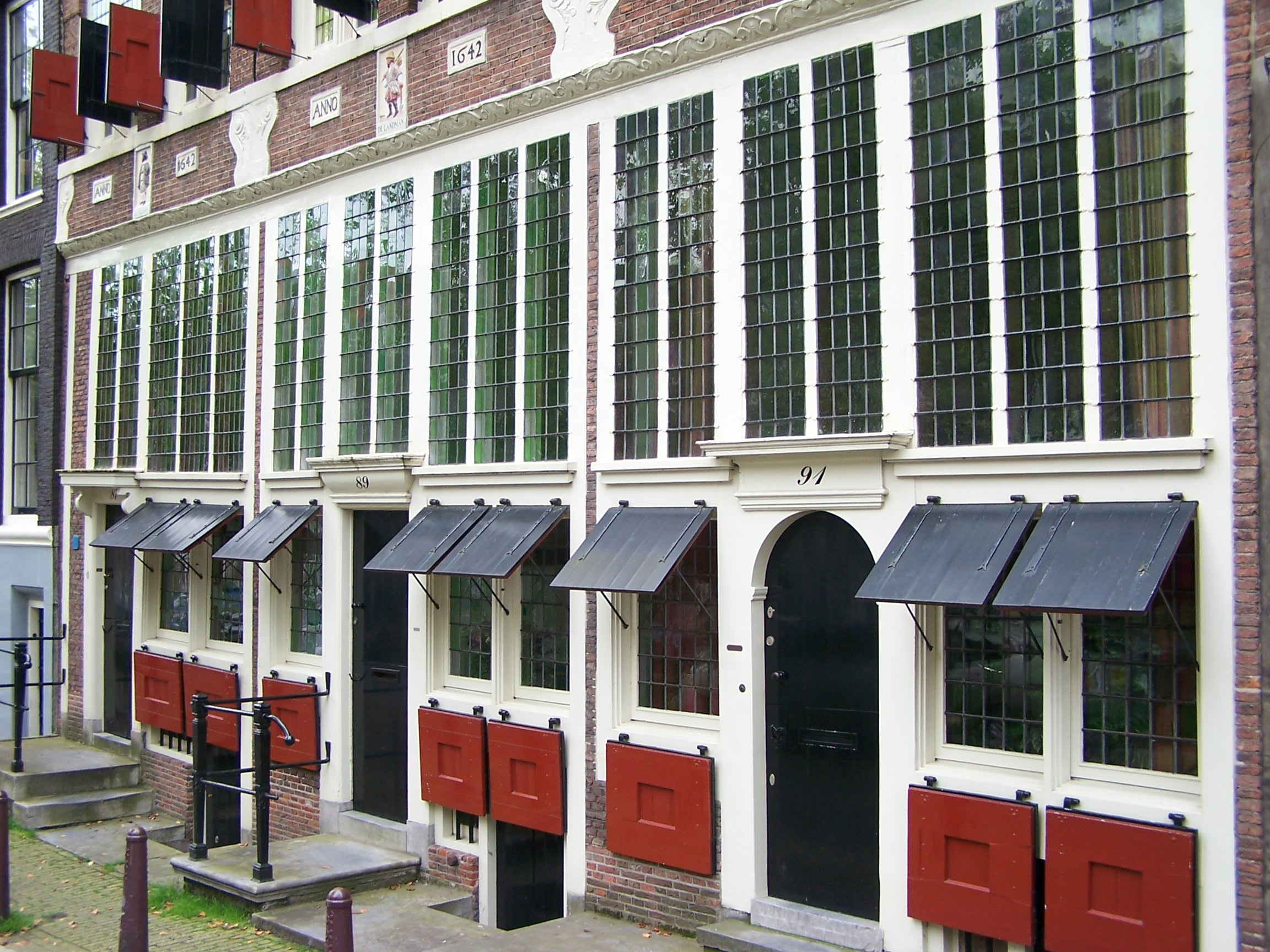
Amsterdam Bloemgracht 87, 89 and 91 angle

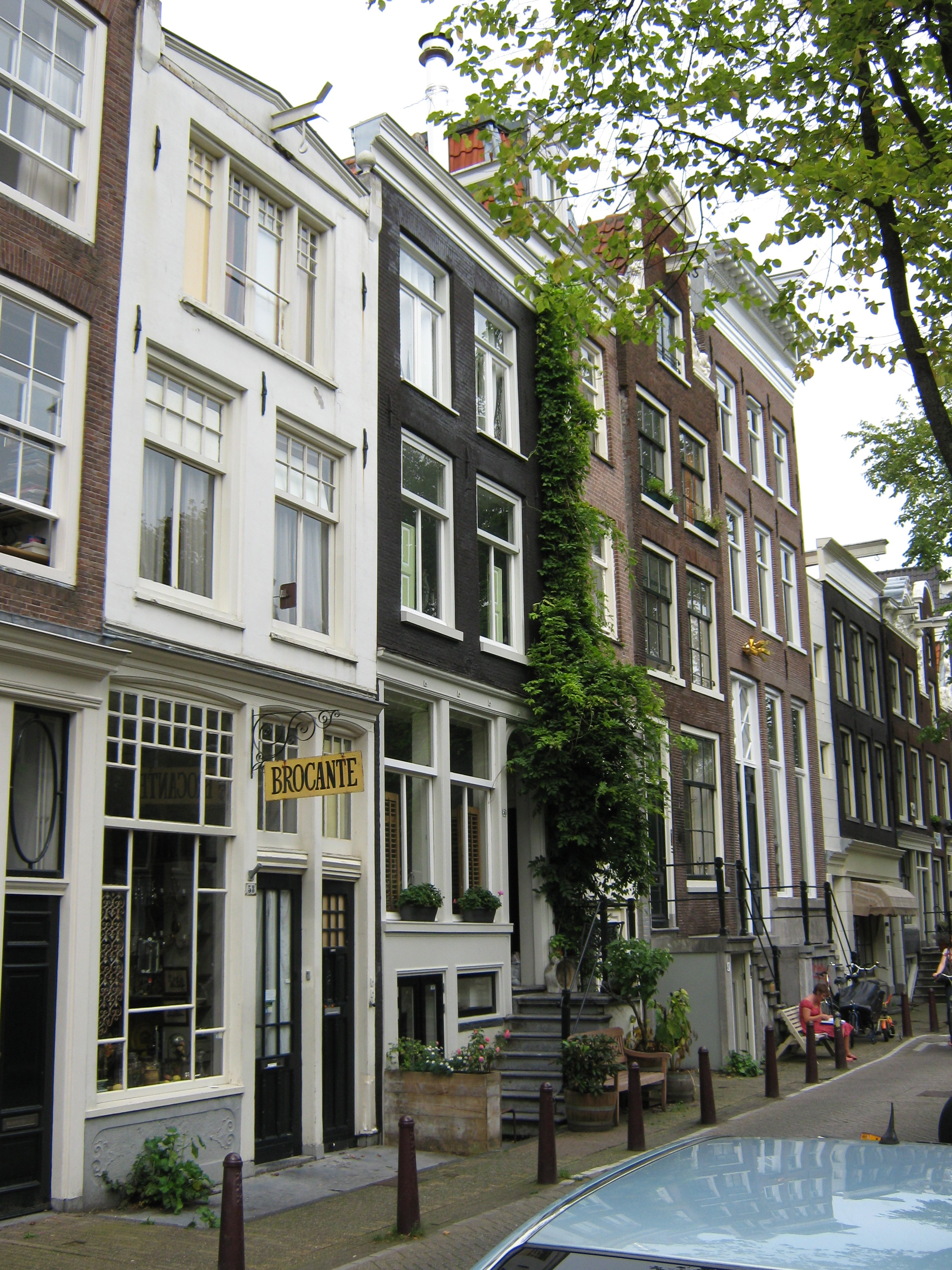
Bloemgracht 56

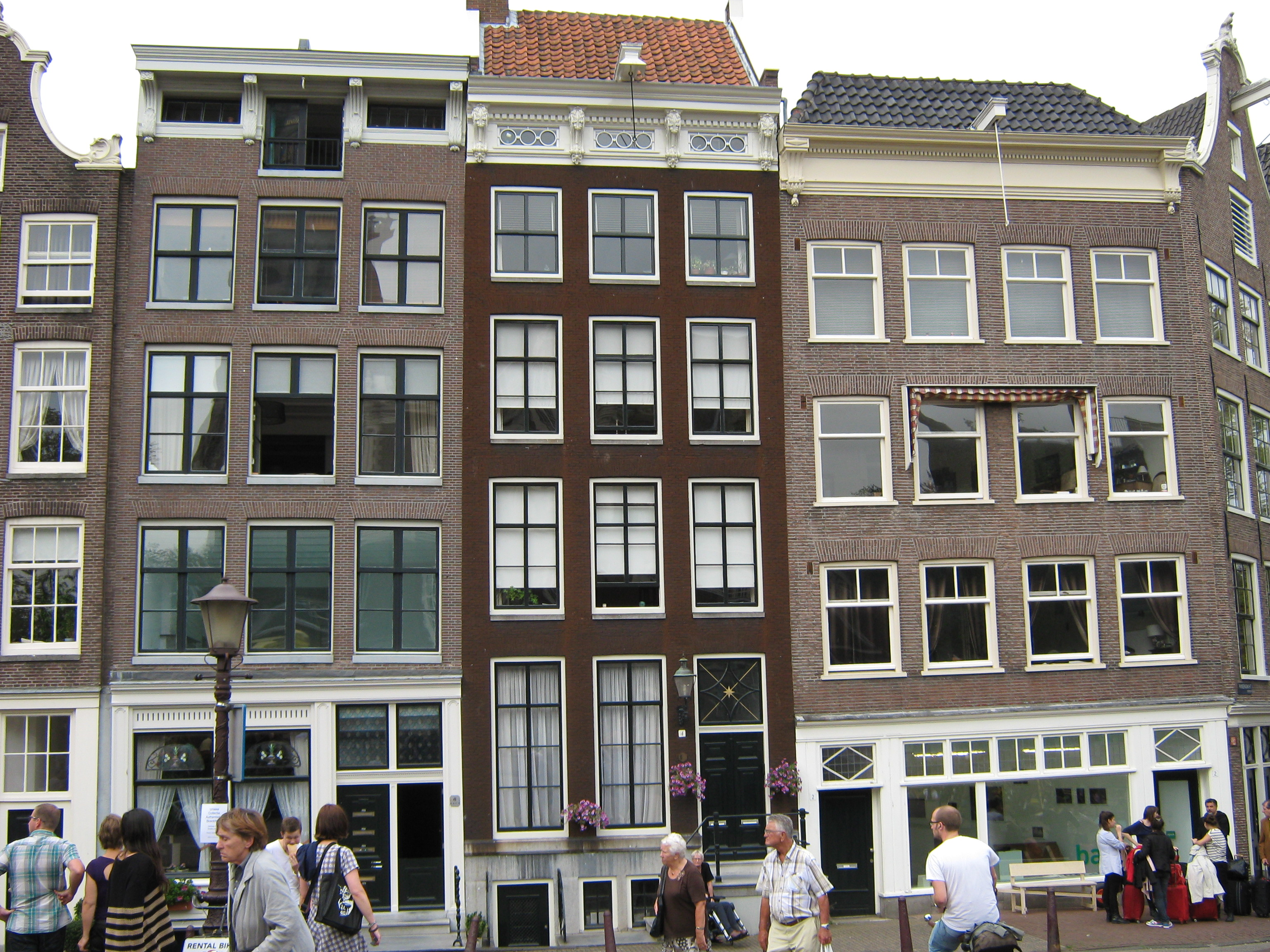
Bloemgracht 4

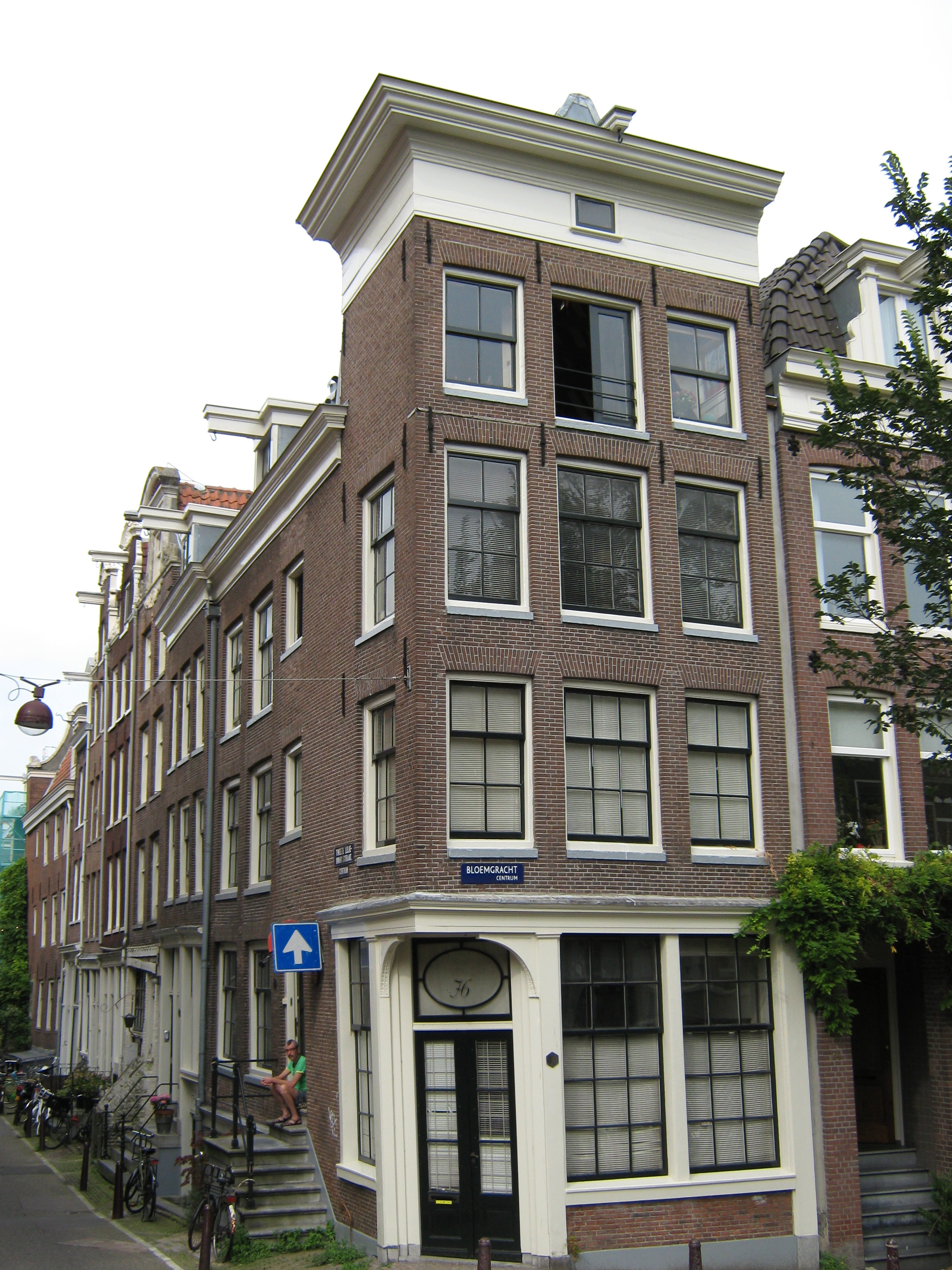
Bloemgracht 76

== Architecture ==
- Bloemgracht 13 has a clock gable with fruit and flower garlands. Clock facades are generally very austere. They mainly date to the period 1680–1690. The year of construction of Bloemgracht 13 is unknown.
- Bloemgracht 87, 89 and 91, also called "De Drie Hendricken", with their typical stepped gables and frequent use of glass, were built in 1642. The gable stones show a farmer, an urban dweller and a sailor. The stone façade begins above the wooden lower part of the store-house. The stone facade often rests on a "puibal", which primarily has a constructive function; the wooden bottom wall must have a stone façade. During restorations, the wooden base is often reinforced with an iron support beam, which is concealed behind a wooden covering.
- On the Bloemgracht 108, built in 1644, there is a Philips Vingboons imitation: a so-called miniature Vingboons with a pilaster neck gable simply executed in brick with some austere ornaments.

== Bridges ==
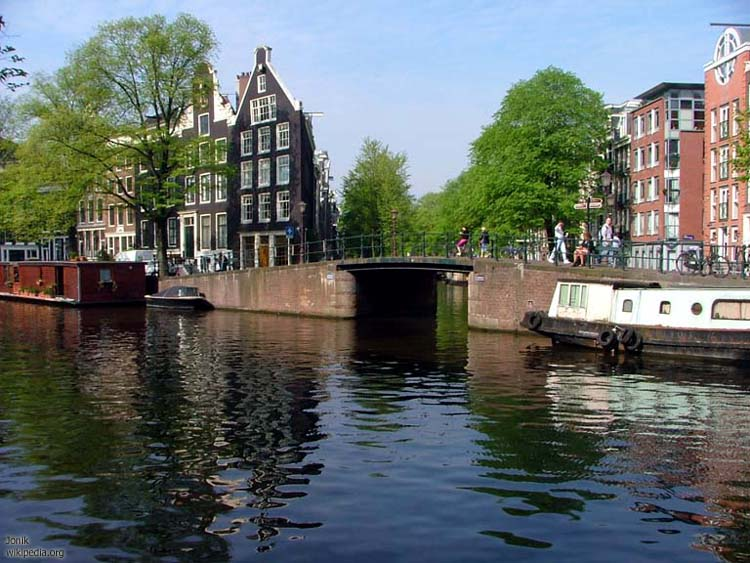
De Kees de jongenbrug, Prinsengracht entrance to Bloemgracht in the Jordaan

The Bloemgracht is spanned by five bridges, all fixed:

Bridge number	Name	Use	Passage Width	Passage Height	Manager
119		Lijnbaansgracht	10,00	1,85	Centrum
120	Atlasbrug	Tweede Bloemdwarsstraat	8,74	1,73	Centrum
121	Rosa Overbeekbrug	Eerste Bloemdwarsstraat	8,74	2,04	Centrum
123	Kees de Jongenbrug	Prinsengracht	6,30	1,78	Centrum
160	Bullebaksluis	Marnixstraat	4,60	1,80	Centrale stad

The Kees de Jongenbrug (Bridge No. 123, corner Bloemgracht / Prinsengracht) and the Rosa Overbeek Bridge (Bridge No. 121, corner Tweede Leliedwarsstraat) are named after characters in the work of writer Theo Thijssen, for whom there is a museum in Eerste Leliedwarsstraat. The Anne Frank House is opposite the Kees de jongenbrug, in the shadow of the Westertoren on Prinsengracht 263.

== Notable residents ==
- Sebastiaen Jansen Krol (1595–1674), governor of New Netherland (1632–1633)
- Jan den Uyl (1596–1639), still life painter
- Anthoni van Noordt (1619–1675), organist and composer
- Thomas Asselijn (1620–1701) poet and playwright
- Jan van Noordt (1623–1676), history and portrait painter
- Jacobus Heiblocq (1623–1690) poet and rector of the Latin School
- Frederik Ruysch (1638–1731), anatomist, zoologist and botanist
- Jan van Huchtenburg (1647–1733), horse and war painter
- Cornelis Calkoen (1639–1710), wholesaler and captain
- Jan van Huchtenburg (1646–1733), painter
- Jurriaen Andriessen (1742–1809), wallpaper painter and draftsman
- Anna Cramer (1873–1968), composer and pianist
- Chris Bolczek (born 1948), actor and singer
- Harry Slinger (born 1949 on the Bloemgracht), singer
- Leendert van den Muijzenberg (1905–87), engineer and resistance fighter during the Second World War rented out rooms in the 1960s to, among others: Frits Bolkestein, Johan Polak and Dolph Kohnstamm.
- Matthijs van Nieuwkerk (born 1960), journalist and television presenter
- Saskia Noort (born 1967), writer and journalist
- Wesley Sneijder (born 1984), soccer player and Yolanthe Cabau van Kasbergen, ( 1985 ) actress and presenter

== See also ==
- Canals of Amsterdam
