= Looiersgracht =

Canal in Amsterdam

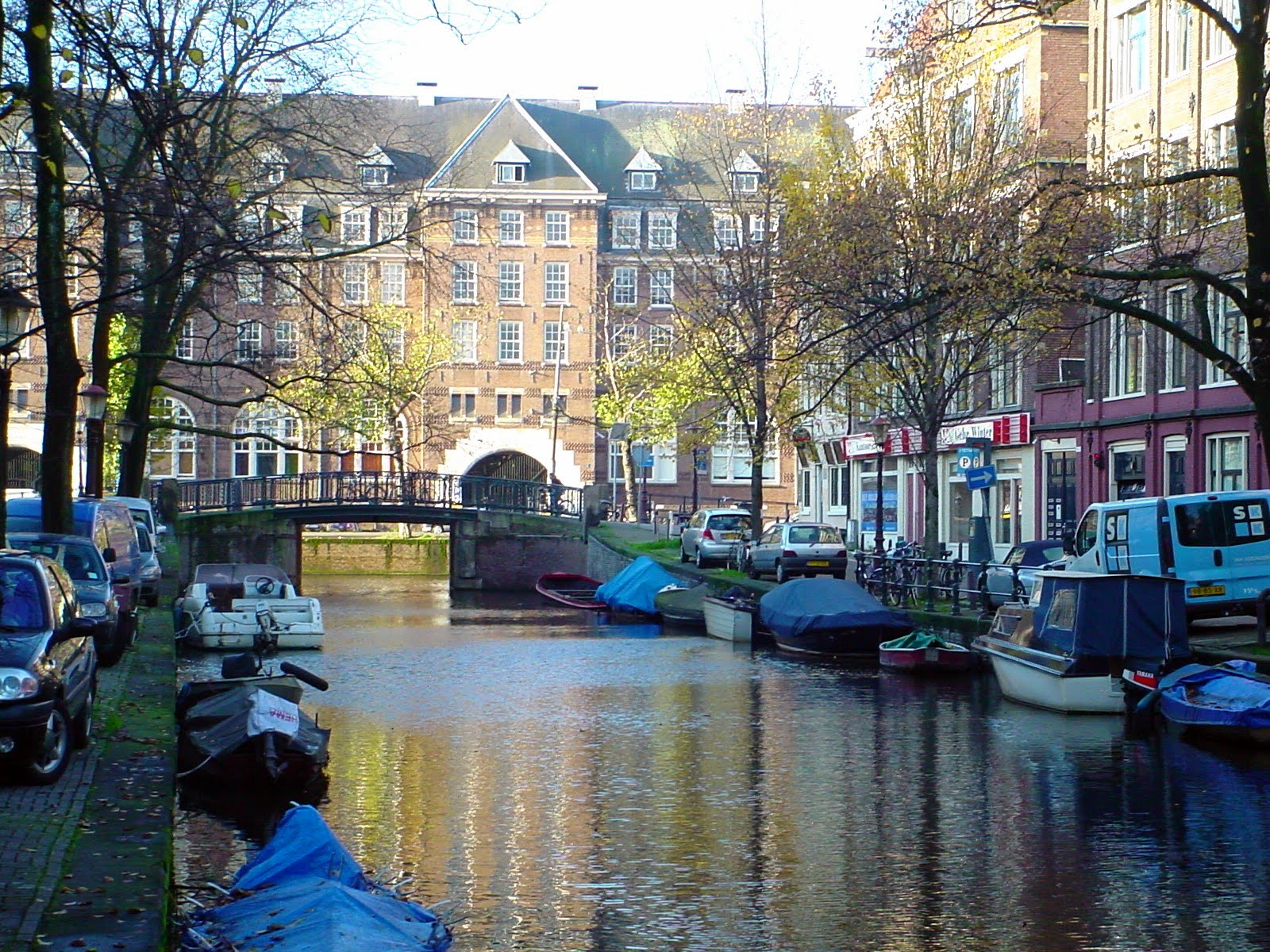

- Location of Looiersgracht (dark blue) in Jordaan
- Location: Amsterdam
- Postal code: 1016
- Coordinates: 52.368350°N 4.880887°E
- East end: Prinsengracht
- To: Lijnbaansgracht

The Looiersgracht (Dutch pronunciation: [ˈloːi.ərsˌxrɑxt]; Tanners' Canal) is a short canal in Amsterdam, between Prinsengracht (at no. 334) and Lijnbaansgracht (no. 206) in the Jordaan neighborhood of the Amsterdam-Centrum district. The Looiersgracht borders the Grachtengordel (canal belt). The Oude Looiersstraat runs parallel to the canal, and the Eerste, Tweede and Derde Looiersdwarsstraat are side streets entering the north side.

== History ==
The canal originated when the canal belt was dug south from the Brouwersgracht starting in 1612. From the outset, the Looiersgracht was predestined for tanneries. The city council wanted to concentrate these factories in one place due to the highly adverse effects on the environment of local residents.

Due to the city expansion the tanneries, which were still located outside the city in the sixteenth century, gradually came to be within the city limits. In addition to the Looiersgracht, the Elandsgracht and the nearby Runstraat and the Huidenstraat also derive their names from this traditionally thriving industry around the trade in animal skins. After being filled in the Oude Looierssloot became the Derde Looiersdwarsstraat.

After 1658, the tanneries expanded on lands east of the Vijzelgracht, as in the Nieuwe Looiersstraat. The Nieuwe Looierssloot became the Fokke Simonszstraat after being filled in.

The smelter of silversmith Anthoni Grill (1607–75) for "investigating the content of gold or silver" was established between 1651 and 1661 on the Looiersgracht.

From the early 17th century the "Maze Garden" and image gallery: "The Old Maze" were located on the corner of the Looiersgracht / Prinsengracht. The amusement park with a maze of green hedges, a water feature and a gallery with mechanically moving images was in operation from before 1625 to 1862. Here, among other things, one saw images of David and Goliath which could roll their eyes. The images made by Albert Jansz Vinckenbrinck are now in the Schutters Gallery of the Amsterdam Museum.

Six of the eleven Jordanian canals were back-filled in the 19th century. Only the Bloemgracht, Egelantiersgracht, Lauriergracht, Looiersgracht and Passeerdersgracht remained besides the canal belt Prinsengracht, Keizersgracht, Herengracht, Singel, Lijnbaansgracht, Brouwersgracht, Leliegracht and Leidsegracht.

From the first half of the 19th century, the 'Hercules' building, on the Looiersgracht at nos. 45-55 and the adjacent buildings housed the Suikerwerkfabriek Klene. The factory was demolished in 1988–89. The 'Residence Le Jardin' apartment complex was built here on Lijnbaansgracht no. 208-210 and Looiersgracht no. 51-109.

In the building on Looiersgracht no. 58-60-62, which bears the inscription 'Bierbottelarij van Die Port van Cleve' on the façade, the 'Hollandsch Tafel Bier' (bottled beer) affiliated with Heineken and the Hulscher brothers was bottled. From 1894 the Cartonnage and advertising card factory FJ Schwendemann was located here.

At the end of the 19th century Looiersgracht no. 19 was the Public Lower Poor School 3.

Around 1900, at Looiersgracht no. 27-33, at the corner of Passeerdersstraat, the Pharmaceutical Chemical Factory was 'the Pharmaceutical Trade Association'. The current new building was built around 1985.

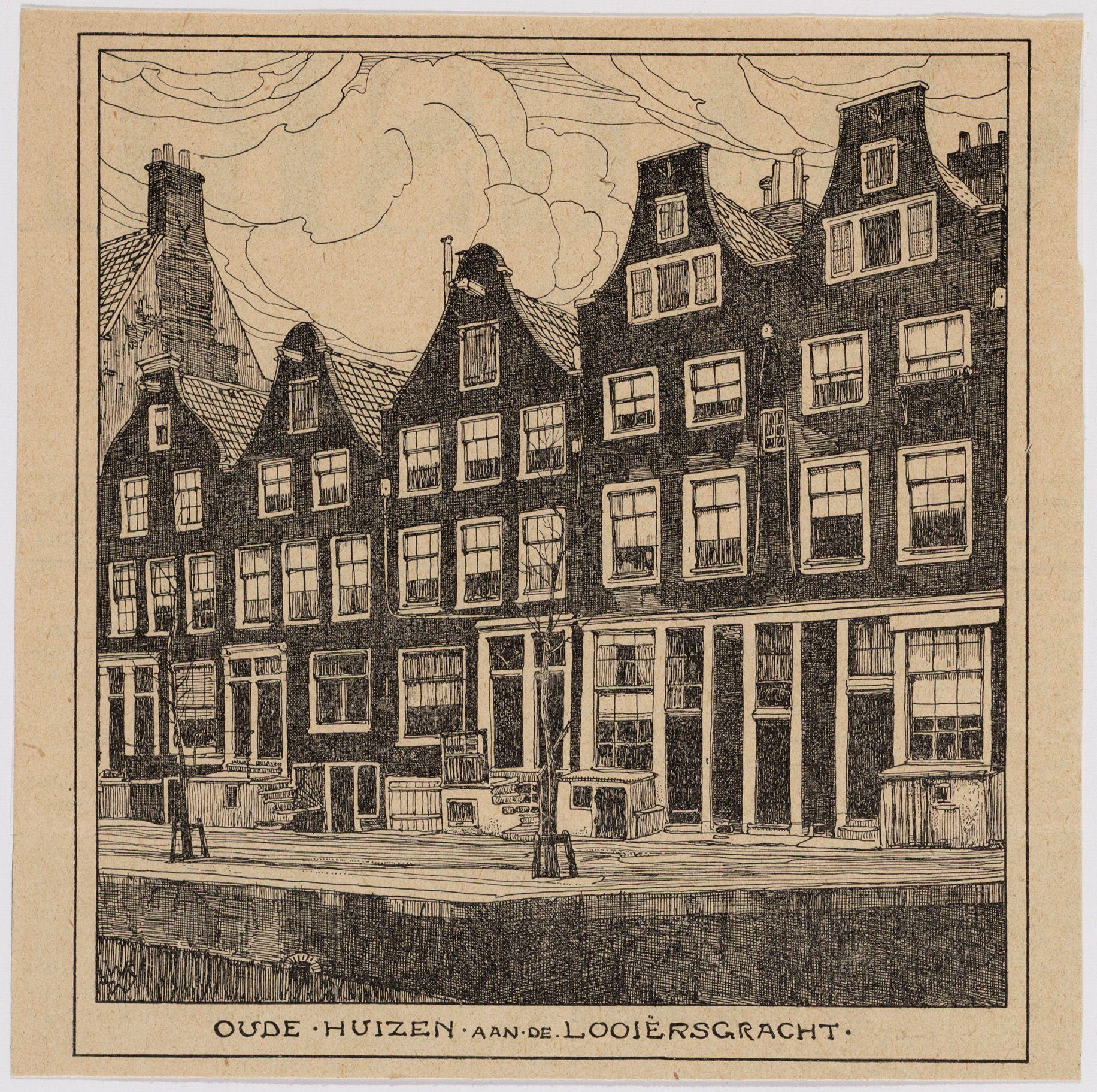
Looiersgracht 5-17 by Ludwig Willem Reymert Wenckebach (1906)

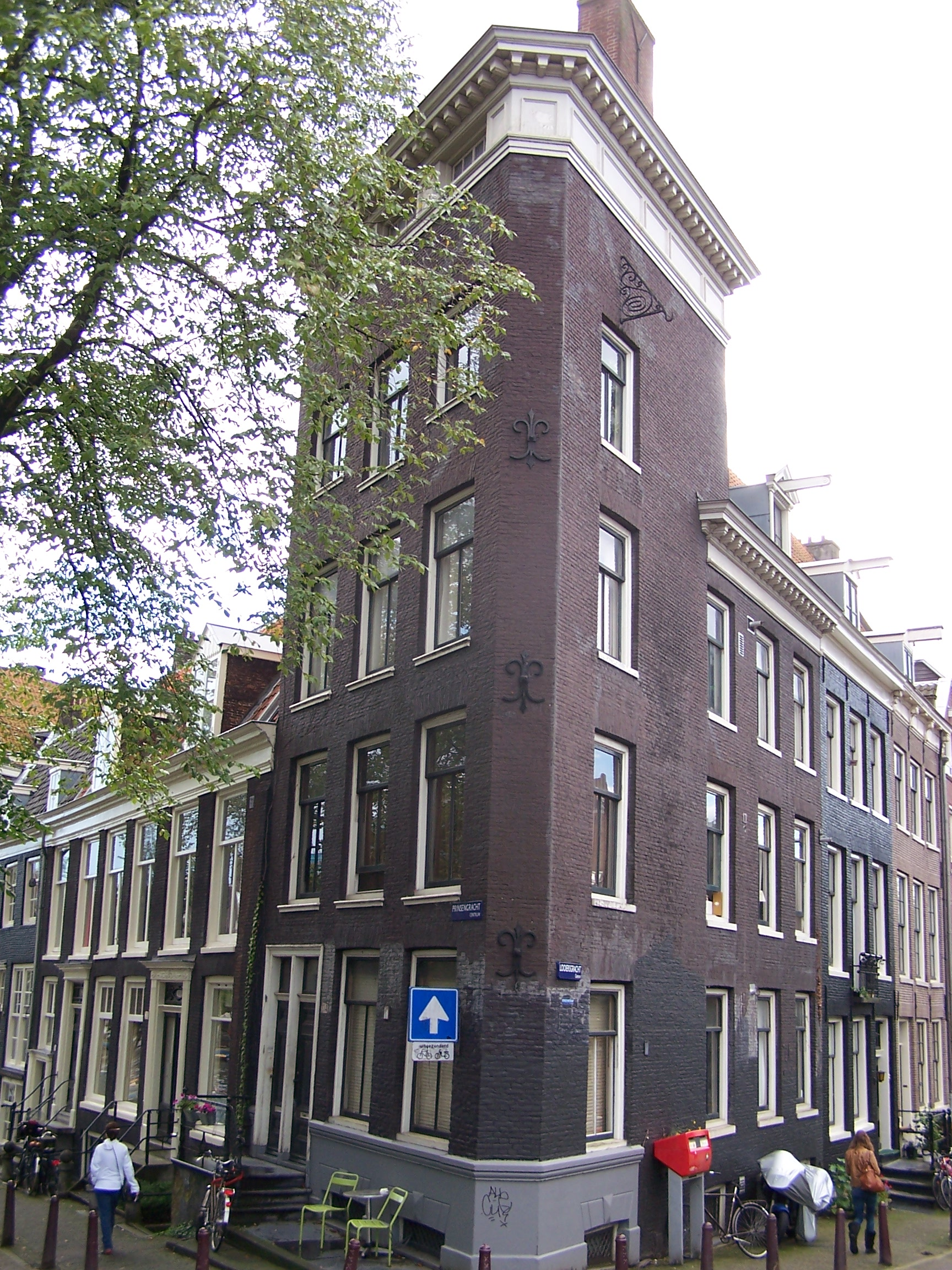
Hoek Looiersgracht with Prinsengracht

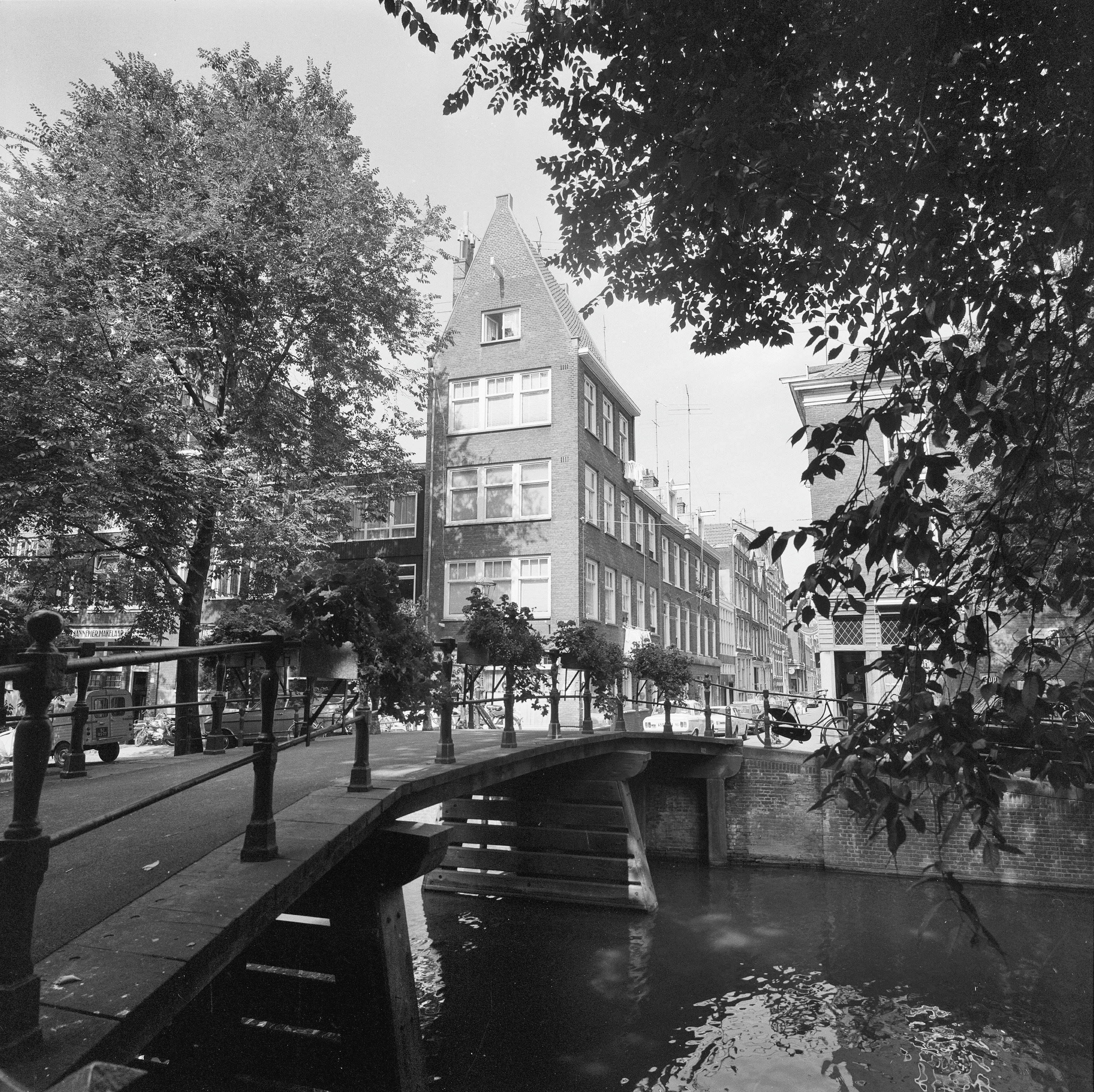
Footbridge

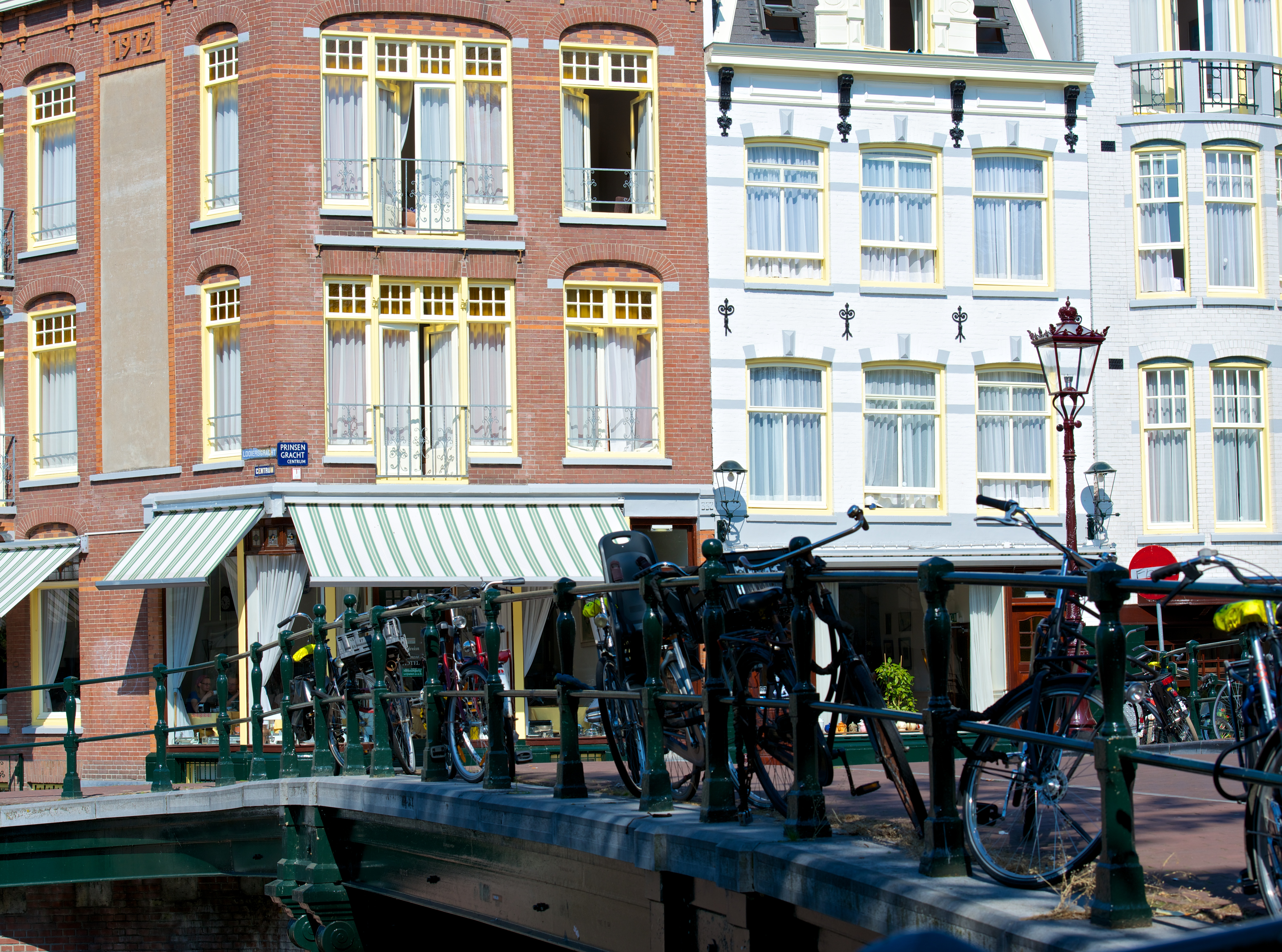
Hoek Prinsengracht, Looiersgracht

== Architecture ==
Most canal houses on the Looiersgracht are used as residential houses. An example of the neck gables that are popular in Amsterdam can be seen at Looiersgracht 21. This type from 1648 is sometimes referred to as a small Vingboons imitation or miniature Vingboons.

The former Looiersgracht church, also known as Simon de Looier, on Looiersgracht 70-72, is sandwiched between the houses and stands out only for its shouldered spout with high windows. The facade of this late 19th-century gallery church is divided into three parts by narrow brick pilasters. Inside, the simple space is particularly striking, since the galleries are supported by cast-iron columns. Because the church is crowded by houses, some of the lighting comes through windows in the barrel vault. The Bible Center "Bij Simon de Looier" is housed here. A bible shop is located in the entrance.

== Trivia ==
- The ' Looierssluis ' (bridge 103) is located over the Looiersgracht at the Prinsengracht.
- Bridge 100 is located on the Lijnbaansgracht and at Eerste Looiersdwarsstraat there is (pedestrian) bridge 102, they are both municipal monuments.
- The MV Looiersgracht is a cargo ship from the Spliethoff charter office.
- From 1992 to 1997 the Osho's Supernova Cultural Center Archive in Amsterdam was located in a former carpentry factory on Looiersgracht (no. 43).

== See also ==
- Canals of Amsterdam

== Sources ==
- Alles over straatnamen: Looiersgracht
- Rijksmuseum over de timmerfabriek aan de Looiersgracht
- Binnen de grachtengordel mochten geen ambachten uitgeoefend worden
