= Egelantiersgracht =

Canal in Amsterdam, Netherlands

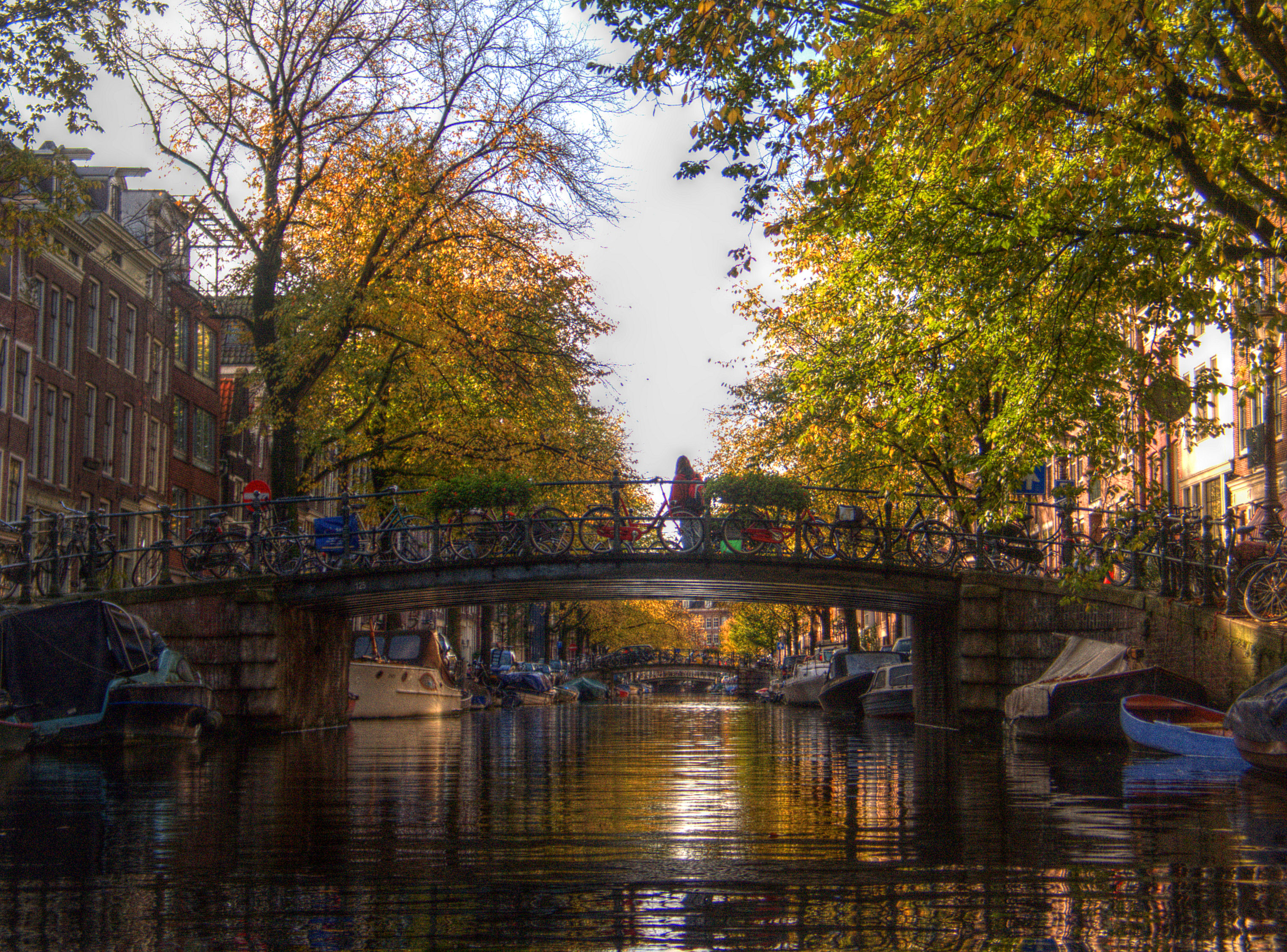
- Hilletjesbrug

- Location of Egelantiersgracht (dark blue)
- Location: Amsterdam
- Postal code: 1015
- Coordinates: 52°22′33″N 4°52′51″E
- From: Prinsengracht
- To: Lijnbaansgracht

Construction
- Construction start: 17th century

The Egelantiersgracht in Amsterdam is a canal in the Jordaan neighbourhood in the Amsterdam-Centrum borough. The canal lies between the Prinsengracht and the Lijnbaansgracht.

== History ==
The Jordaan, between the outer canal and the town wall, was part of a major urban development at the start of the 17th century. The canals and streets were not laid out on a new plan, but were enlargements of the existing polder ditches and pathways. In the Jordaan many canals and streets are named after flowers. This canal is named for an eglantine rose (Rosa rubiginosa). During construction of the canal belt, a pattern was followed that curved around the old city center in a semicircle. As a result, the Egelantiersgracht is slanted in relation to the canal belt and does not connect directly to the bridges over the Prinsengracht.

The houses in this neighborhood were partly built for artisans and skilled tradespeople. The houses are built on a smaller scale than the great mansions on Herengracht, Keizersgracht and Prinsengracht. For this reason, they are in great demand as residences. There has been some new development, but the Egelantiersgracht has kept much of its original character.

Six of the eleven Jordaan canals were filled in during the 19th century. The Egelantiersgracht, Bloemgracht, Lauriergracht, Looiersgracht and Passeerdersgracht maintained open water connections between the Prinsengracht and the Lijnbaansgracht.

== Architecture ==
- The St. Andrieshofje at Egelantiersgracht 107-114 was built in 1617. The passageway to its courtyard is splendidly decorated in blue and white tiles.
- Egelantiersgracht 8, built in 1649, is a typical example of austere Amsterdam renaissance, with the upper sections of the front gable in original condition. It has two gable stones, one of St Willibrord and one of a brewer. Onno Boers, in his 2007 monograph of gable stones in Amsterdam, explains more fully: the Willibrord stone is copied from an engraving by Cornelis Bloemaert, ca. 1640, which features a wine barrel and a bottle: the barrel signifies a miracle performed by the saint, who once replenished a monastery's empty wine barrel by putting his crozier in it, and the bottle another miracle, when 12 or even 40 monks drank from a bottle he miraculously refilled. That, in combination with the stone with the brewer, leads Boers to conclude the house must have been a drinking establishment.
- Egelantiersgracht 66, which was demolished in the Hunger Winter, was rebuilt between 1963 and 1964 by the Diogenes Foundation. The neighboring buildings Egelantiersgracht 68 and 70 have been restored.
- Also on the Egelantiersgracht there were so-called corridors in several places between the houses . These narrow alleys provided access to the (often illegally) built-in backyards behind the row of houses, where the less fortunate lived in dilapidated shelters.

== Famous residents ==
- The pedagogue John Amos Comenius (1592–1670), lived in Egelantiersgracht 62.
- The tobacco pipe maker Eduard Bird (c. 1610–65) owned a house on the corner of Egelantiersgracht and the last cross street.
- Jan Bouman (1706–76), architect of the Dutch quarter in Potsdam, grew up on the Egelantiersgracht.
- The writer Theun de Vries (1907-2005) lived in Egelantiersgracht 66.

== See also ==
- Canals of Amsterdam

== Sources ==
- Catling, Christopher; Pascoe, Robin (2 April 2013), DK Eyewitness Travel Guide: Amsterdam, DK Publishing, ISBN 978-1-4654-1108-2
- De Roever, Margriet (1 January 1987), "The Fort Orange "EB" Pipe Bowls", in Blackburn, Roderic H.; Kelley, Nancy A. (eds.), New World Dutch Studies: Dutch Arts and Culture in Colonial America, 1609-1776 : Proceedings of the Symposium, SUNY Press / Albany Institute of History and Art, ISBN 978-0-939072-10-1
- "Egelantiersgracht, Canal in Jordaan & the West", Lonely Planet
