= Deutzen Hofje =

17th-century almshouses in Amsterdam

Coordinates: 52.3628°N 4.8902°E

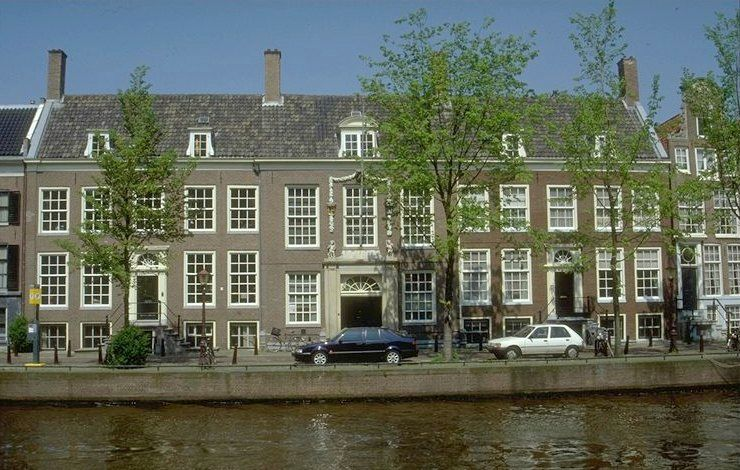
Front gate building on the Prinsengracht

The Deutzen Hofje or Deutzenhofje is a 17th-century hofje on the Prinsengracht 857 in Amsterdam. It is the largest hofje built in the 17th century.

== Building ==
Three double canal mansions on the Prinsengracht are part of the hofje, but only the richly ornamented middle gate was used by the hofje pensioners. The two outer double houses are rental homes that add to the hofje's income. The gatehouse is an unusual canal mansion because the entrance is at street level, meant for use by the pensioners. Generally Amsterdam canal mansions have a staircase leading to the bel-etage.

== History ==
The hofje was built in 1692 from the proceeds of the bequest by Agneta Deutz, who had purchased the land and named the regents before her death. She intended it to be used by old servants and poor relations. On the gablestone in front is inscribed:

Agneta Deutz laat hier haar liefde en godsdienst blijken
Den Armen tot een troost, tot voorbeeld aan de rijken
Anno 1695

On the top floor the regent's room has a view over the canal. There a portrait of Agneta can still be seen. The hofje had room originally for 19 pensioners. The garden has an old pump and is planted with flowers in the summer months. In 1964 it was expanded to 31 pensioners homes. Old women are still welcome to live there.
