= Jan Ligthart =

Dutch teacher and philosopher

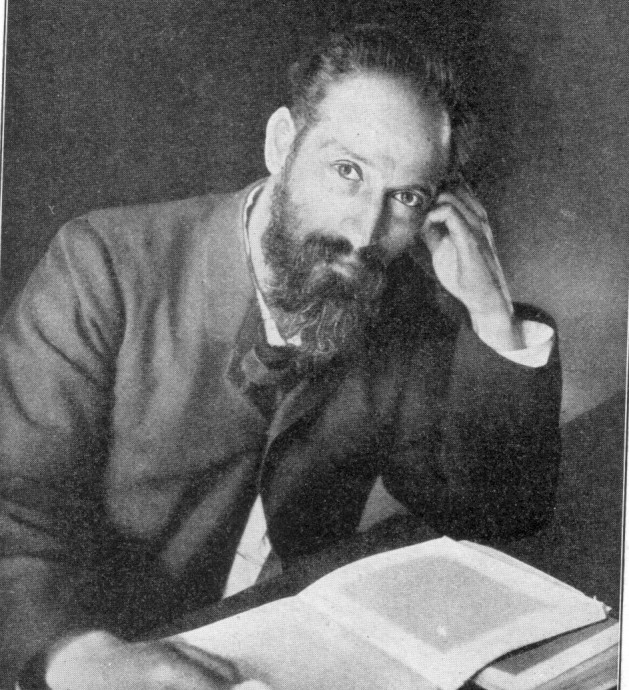
- Jan Ligthart, c. 1890
- Born: 11 January 1859; Amsterdam, Netherlands
- Died: 16 February 1916 (aged 57); Laag-Soeren, Netherlands
- Occupations: Teacher and philosopher
- Spouse: Marie Cachet
- Parent(s): Cornelis Ligthart; Anna van Spall
- Relatives: Juliana of the Netherlands (student)

Jan Ligthart (11 January 1859 - 16 February 1916) was a Dutch teacher and philosopher. He became known for his innovative educational methods and the modernisation of the Dutch education system. He wrote many articles and books about education.

== Biography ==
Jan Ligthart was born on 11 January 1859 in Amsterdam, in the Jordaan district. His father Cornelis Ligthart, was a carpenter and grocer, who suffered from epileptic seizures. His mother Anna van Spall, daughter of a pastor, came from Klundert. Both of his parents died during his childhood. Ligthart graduated from the Reformed Christian college of Bloemgracht. Afterwards he worked in several schools as a teacher. In 1886, he married Marie Cachet, with whom he had three children, two daughters and one son. Due to his illnesses he was put in a sanatorium. On 16 February 1916 he died after falling in a canal and drowning.
