= Anna Cramer =

Dutch composer (1873–1968)

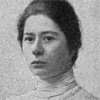
Anna Cramer

Anna M. Cramer (15 July 1873 – 4 June 1968) was a Dutch composer.

== Life and career ==
Anna Cramer was born in Amsterdam and studied at the Conservatory of Music in Amsterdam. After graduating in 1897, she studied composition in Germany with Wilhelm Berger and Max von Schillings. After completing her studies she worked successfully as a composer and had several works performed in 1906–07. Cramer published her songs Op. 1–4 in Germany between 1907 and 1910.

Cramer lived in Munich and Berlin from 1910 to 1925, and then moved to Vienna. In Austria she collaborated with poet and composer Walter Simlinger, who wrote the libretti for her two opera, Der letzte Tanz and Dr. Pipalumbo (1926–1927).

Cramer suffered from mental health problems and in 1930 was committed to a mental institution. She was released in January 1931 and returned to The Netherlands, but then withdrew from public life. No more of her songs were published in her lifetime. However, she continued composing, and in 1958 she stored a suitcase of manuscripts at a bank in Amsterdam.

Her mental health problems grew worse, and in 1960 she was hospitalized again, remaining in a nursing home until her death at the age of 94. The suitcase containing her manuscripts was donated to Haags Gemeentemuseum, and her compositions are currently stored in the Nederlands Muziekinstituut in The Hague. She died in Blaricum.

== Works ==
Cramer often incorporated folk themes and cabaret into her works and wrote a number of lieder. The Sechs Lieder, op. 4, have been orchestrated by Jeppe Moulijn.

Selected compositions include:

- Fünf Gedichte, op. 1
  - Bispill
  - Bussemann
  - Wa heet se doch?
  - De Jäger
  - Int Holt
- Schlafliedchen für’s Peterle
- Sechs Lieder, op. 4
  - Erwachen in den grellen Tag
  - Ave Rosa
  - Michel mit der Lanze
  - Vale
  - Auftrag
  - Waldhornklänge
- Wenn der Abend sinkt
- Wenn die Linde blüht
- Zehn Gedichte
  - Souvenir de Malmaison
  - In einer grossen Stadt
  - Blümekens
  - Briefwechsel
  - Spruch
  - Meiner Mutter
  - Auf einer grünen Wiese
  - Nach dem Balle
  - Siegesfest
  - Fatinga
- Zwei Notturnos
  - Im Pavillon
  - Am Meer
- Der letzte Tanz, opera
- Dr. Pipalumbo, opera
