= Lijnbaansgracht =

Canal in Amsterdam, Netherlands

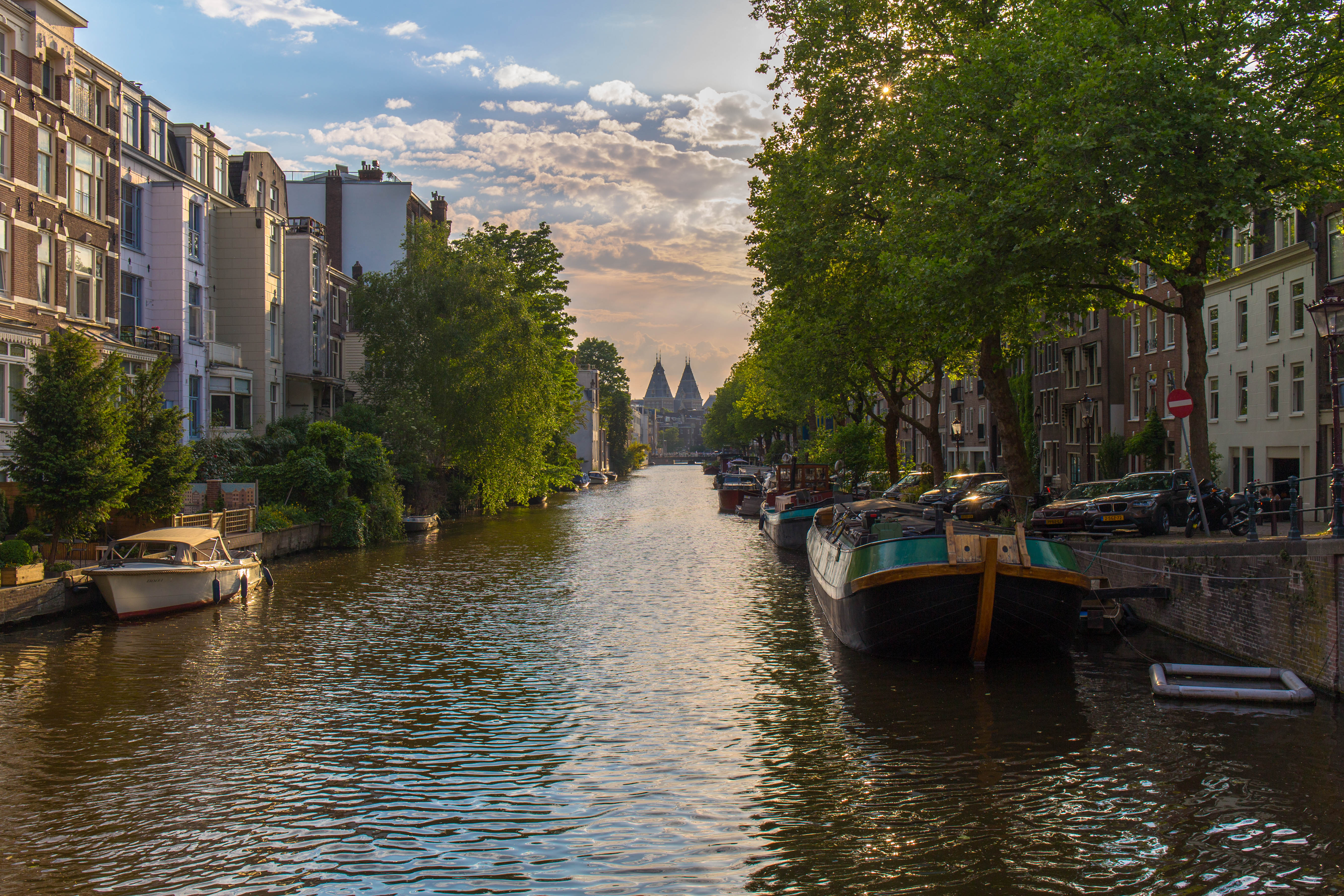
- Lijnbaansgracht from Reguliersgracht, Rijksmuseum in the background Part of the Lijnbaansgracht on the west border of Jordaan
- Location: Amsterdam
- Postal code: 1015, 1016, 1017
- South end: Brouwersgracht
- North end: Reguliersgracht

Lijnbaansgracht (Dutch pronunciation: [ˈlɛimbaːnsˌxrɑxt]) is a partly filled-in canal in Amsterdam which bends beyond the boundary of the center, Amsterdam-Centrum. The canal runs parallel to the Singelgracht, between the Brouwersgracht and the Reguliersgracht.

== History ==
The Lijnbaansgracht is named after the ropewalks ("lijnbanen") of the ropemakers, which needed a lot of space and were located here on the former edge of the city. Construction of the canal started in 1612 during the first stages of the construction of the canal belt.

== Filled in parts ==
The Lijnbaansgracht ran through the Schans to the Muiderpoort until the 19th century. In the 19th century parts were filled in, overlaid.

- The Raamplein and the Raamdwarsstraat are on the filled in part between the Passeerdersgracht and the Leidsegracht (between Lijnbaansgracht 217 and 219).
- The Leidseplein and the adjacent Kleine Gartmanplantsoen lie on the filled in part between Lijnbaansgracht 243 and nr. 245. The work around the Kleine-Gartmanplantsoen began in 1909.
- Parts of the canal went up in the Frederiksplein.
- East of the Reguliersgracht to the Amstel River, the Amstelgrachtje, also considered part of the Lijnbaansgracht, was filled in 1866, and is now the Maarten Jansz.
- More eastern, beyond the Amstel, the Nieuwe Lijnbaansgracht extended to the Muidergracht and beyond, at Artis, the Plantage Lijnbaansgracht to the Entrepotdok. The Nieuwe Lijnbaansgracht is completely filled in, here lies the Valckenierstraat. The Muidergracht and Plantage Lijnbaansgracht are now called Plantage Muidergracht.

== Shore ==
Only the built-up bank on the center of the canal was called Lijnbaansgracht. The opposite shore was named differently.

- The Westerkade forms the western shore between the Westerstraat and Bloemgracht (opposite Lijnbaansgracht 65 to 98).
- Part of the Marnixstraat (opposite Lijnbaansgracht numbers 117 to 217) forms the western shore of the canal between Rozengracht and Raamplein.
- The Zieseniskade (opposite Lijnbaansgracht 245 to 284) forms the southern bank of the canal between the Kleine Gartmanplantsoen and the Spiegelgracht.

== Buildings ==
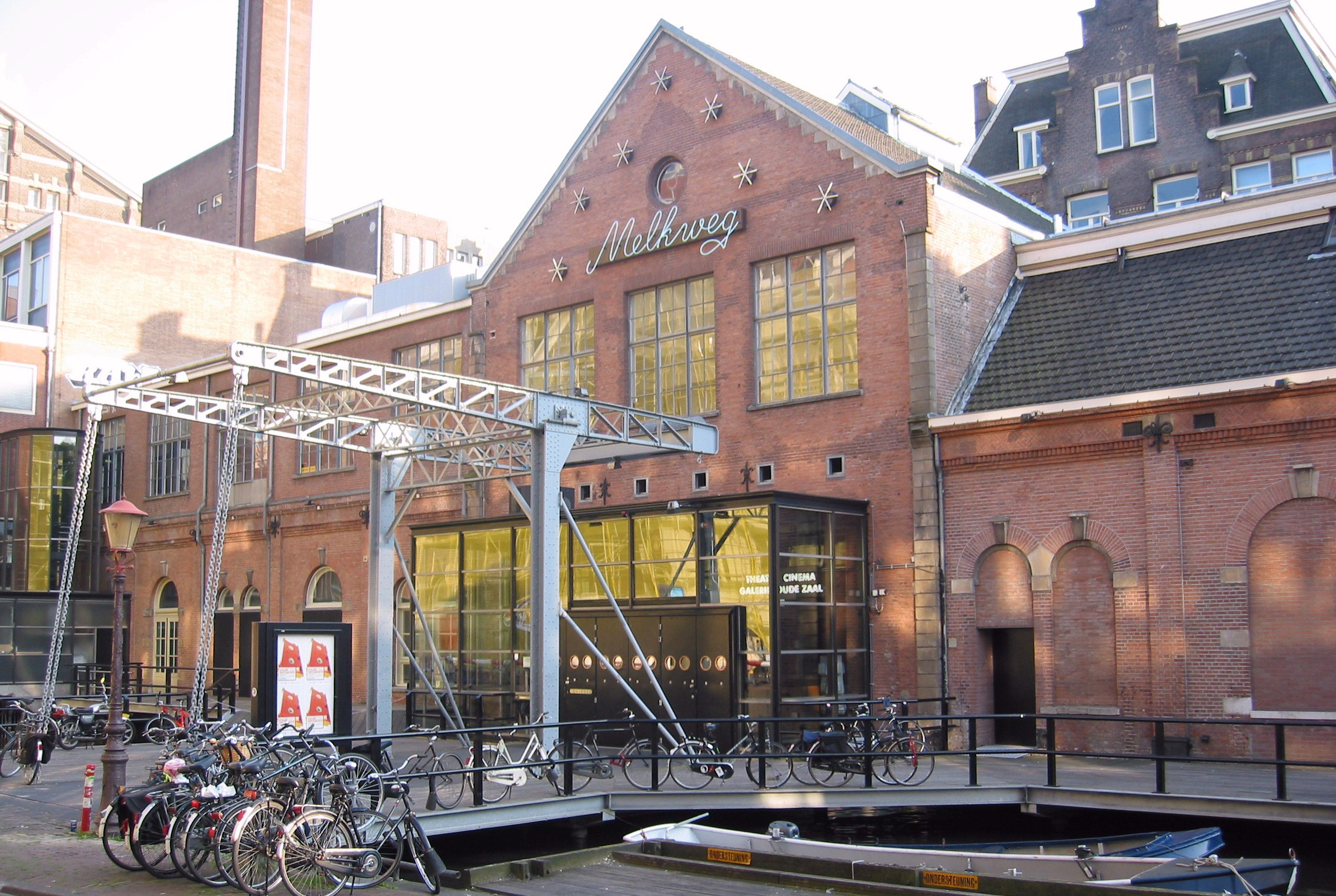
Melkweg at nr. 234

From north to south:

- On the Lijnbaansgracht former 2 to 5, the national monument the town warehouses, which Houses received the address Brouwergracht 887-925
- On the Lijnbaansgracht 15 corner Palmgracht 74, a municipal monument, a former school
- On the Lijnbaansgracht 18A-C, a national monument
- On the Lijnbaansgracht 23-24 corner Palmstraat 101, a municipal monument, laborers houses
- On the Lijnbaansgracht 25-27 corner Willemsstraat 212–226, a municipal monument, workers' houses
- Over the Lijnbaansgracht for the Willemsstraat brug 142, municipal monument
- On the Lijnbaansgracht 31–32, the remains of the Nassaubioscoop
- On the Lijnbaansgracht 47-48 corner Tichelstraat 8–10, a municipal monument, Tichelkerk
- On the Lijnbaansgracht 55-57 corner Gietersstraat 5-57, a municipal monument, apartments and a factory building
- On the Lijnbaansgracht 61, a municipal monument
- Over the Lijnbaansgracht for the Westermarkt / Marnixplein: brug 128 the image Volksvrouw and the Liberation Line of the Earth's Children
- On the Lijnbaansgracht 63-65, Westerstraat 327-405
- On the Lijnbaansgracht, Westerkade 1-9, Municipal monument
- Over the Lijnbaansgracht, in front of the Garden Street: Bridge 130, a municipal monument
- In the Lijnbaansgracht, across the Egelantiersgracht: brug 127
- At the Lijnbaansgracht 93-94] ], a national monument
- On the Lijnbaansgracht, rear of the Hamer en Bouwershofje, Westerkade 21 / Marnixstraat 281, municipal monument
- On the Lijnbaansgracht 95, a national monument
- On the Lijnbaansgracht 99 / Bloemgracht 288-298, a municipal monument
- Over the Lijnbaansgracht for the Bloemgracht: brug 118
- In the Lijnbaansgracht over Bloemgracht: brug 119
- Sgracht, rear façade of Marnixstraat 307-315, former city bank of a loan, a municipal monument
- On the Lijnbaansgracht, rear façade of Marnixstraat 317, former hbs, a municipal monument
- On the Lijnbaansgracht, corner Bloemstraat 191], a national monument
- On the Lijnbaansgracht, rear of Marnixstraat 327-329, a municipal monument
- Over the Lijnbaansgracht for the Rozengracht: brug 117, a municipal monument
- On the Lijnbaansgracht, Marnixstraat 214-220, a municipal monument
- On the Lijnbaansgracht, Marnixstraat 222-232, a municipal monument
- On the Lijnbaansgracht, Marnixstraat 234-244, a municipal monument
- On the Lijnbaansgracht, Marnixstraat 240, Europarking
- On the Lijnbaansgracht 166, national monument
- On the Elandsstraat 179-205 / Lijnbaansgracht 173-181 / 28 Lijnbaansstraat, Concordia-Zuid, municipal monument
- On the Lijnbaansgracht 182 / Lijnbaansstraat 31-33, municipal monumental
- Over the Lijnbaansgracht for the Elandsgracht: Bridge 107
- On the Lijnbaansgracht: corner building Elandsgracht 113, municipal monument
- Cross on the Lijnbaansgracht Elandsgracht 117, police headquarters
- On the Lijnbaansgracht 185-193 at the Elandsgracht lies antique De Looier.
- Over the Looiersgracht in the eastern quay: Brug 100, municipal monument
- On the Lijnbaansgracht, [msterdamsch Huis voor Arbeiders on the Marnixstraat, national monument
- In the Lijnbaansgracht across the Lijnbaansgracht, Brug 99, Municipal monument
- On the Lijnbaansgracht 211-218, apartment complex, municipal monument
- In the Lijnbaansgracht across the Passeerdersgracht, Brug 98, municipal monument
- On the Raamplein 1, a piece of muted Lijnbaansgracht, A former school building, a national monument
- On a piece of unpaved Lijnbaansgracht Leidsegracht 108, a national monument
- In the Lijnbaansgracht on the Leidsegracht, Brug 94
- The Lijnbaansgracht 219 is The police station Lijnbaansgracht located.
- On the Lijnbaansgracht 234-A (at the Leidseplein, behind the Stadsschouwburg) is Melkweg, a multimedia center for pop music, dance, theater, film and visual arts, and also a tea house, restaurant and gallery. It used to be a factory hall of a huge sugar refinery, which was located here from 1854 to 1921. One of the directors was the philanthropist Willem Spakler. From 1920 to 1969 it was a milk factory.
- Cinema Cinecenter is located opposite of Melkweg at number 236.
- The corner house Lijnbaansgracht / Vijzelgracht 63 is a carefully composed collection of architecture motifs from various style periods. The architect, D. van Oort Hzn. designed in historical styles, but from 1900 more in the style of Hendrik Petrus Berlage and the Art Nouveau. The property, completed in 1893, has a rarity because of the detail, in particular the Imperial Portraits and the Lucerne. The lucerne were derived from the sixteenth-century French Renaissance, and the emperors portraits were applied in Amsterdam by the German architects FG Henkenhaff and JF Ebert on the Weesper side 33 -34.
- Brug 198 across the Lijnbaansgracht at the Kleine Gartmanplantsoen from 1913, the first bridge was designed by Jan van der Mey (architect) Jan van der Mey] in the style of the Amsterdamse School.
- The former court of Nooteboome Uytkijk from 1774 is located at Lijnbaansgracht 287, at the Spiegelgracht.

== Various ==
- From 1956 to 1969 the author JJ Voskuil lived with his wife on Lijnbaansgracht 84-hs. He wrote his debut novel Upon closer inspection. Author Onno-Sven Tromp drew attention for his book What do you do in my city?
- The Lijnbaansstraat borders the Lijnbaansgracht between Elandsgracht and the Elandsstraat. The city layout of 1612 also featured a lane track.
- The MV Lijnbaansgracht is a freighter from 1987, owned by the company Spliethoff. The home is Amsterdam. The ship is still docked.
