= Prinsengracht =

Canal in Amsterdam

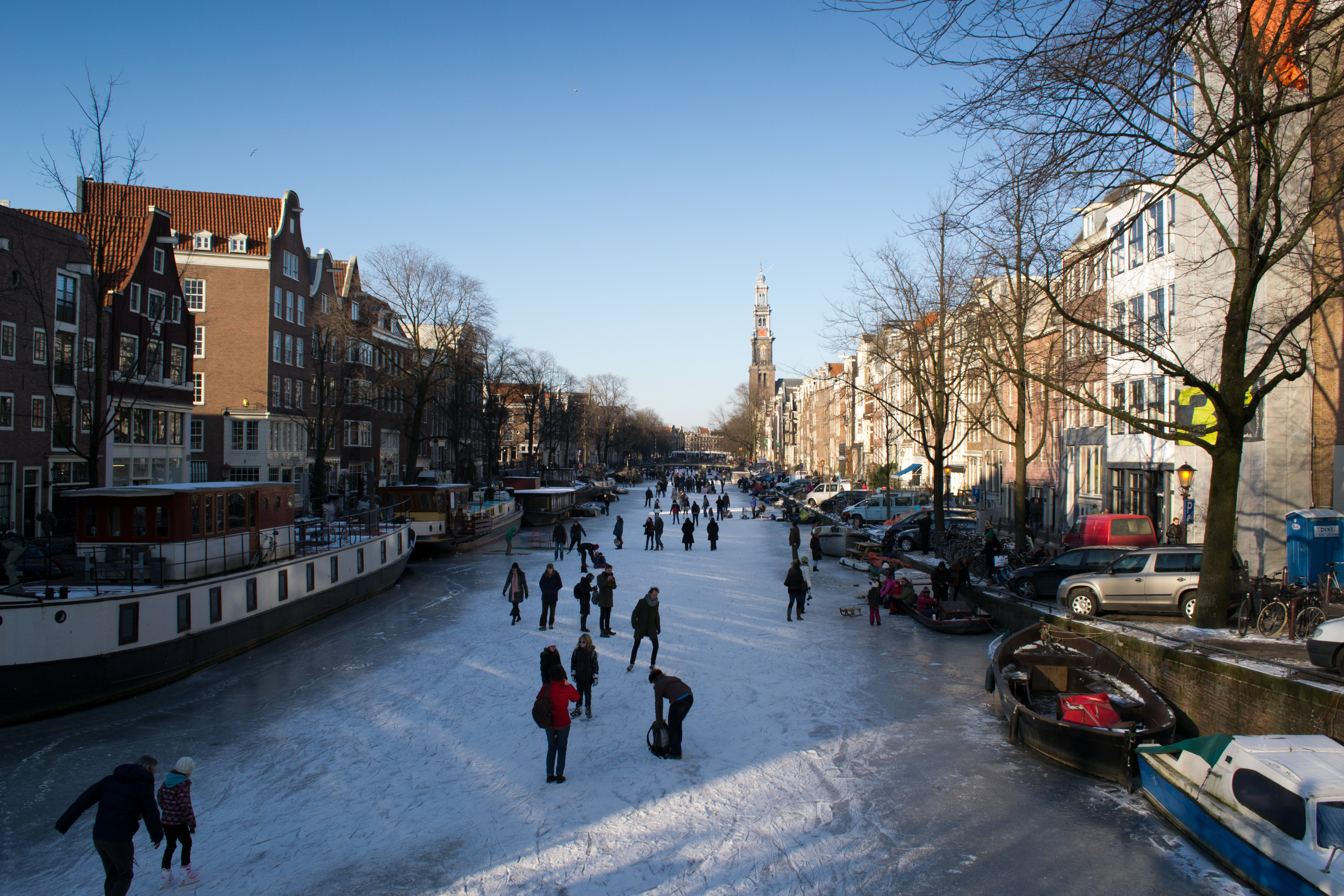
- Prinsengracht with Westertoren, winter

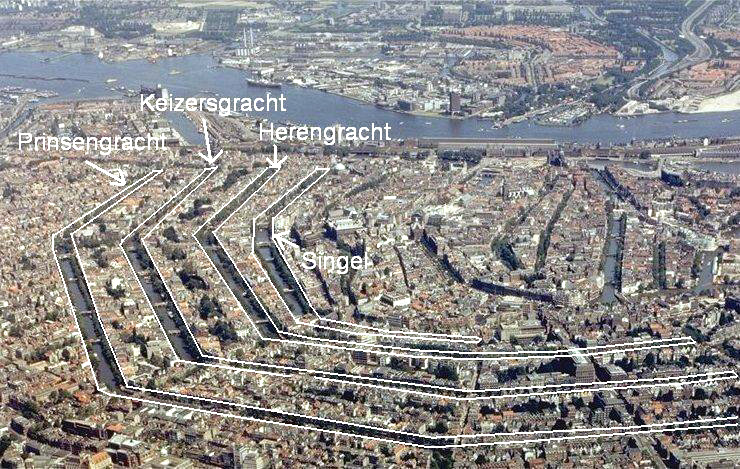
- Location of Prinsengracht in the Canal belt
- Length: 3.2 km (2.0 mi)
- Location: Amsterdam
- Postal code: 1015, 1016, 1017
- East end: Brouwersgracht
- To: Amstel

Construction
- Construction start: 17th century

The Prinsengracht is a 3.2-kilometer (2.0 mi)-long canal that runs parallel to the Keizersgracht in the center of Amsterdam. The canal, named after the Prince of Orange, is the fourth of the four main canals belonging to the canal belt.

== History ==
Construction started in 1612 on the initiative of Mayor Frans Hendricksz Oetgens, after a design by city carpenter Hendrick Jacobsz Staets and city surveyor Lucas Jansz Sinck.

The part between the Leidsegracht and the Amstel was developed during the city expansion of 1658. The section to the east of the Amstel was constructed during the last expansion. This part was named Nieuwe Prinsengracht. The Korte Prinsengracht is in the extension of the Prinsengracht between the Brouwersgracht and the Westerdok.

The Prinsengracht was a key part of Amsterdam’s urban planning during the Dutch Golden Age, serving as a trade route and expanding the city’s economic potential. The entire canal belt was designated a UNESCO World Heritage Site in 2010 for its innovative hydraulic engineering and urban design.

== Architecture and monuments ==
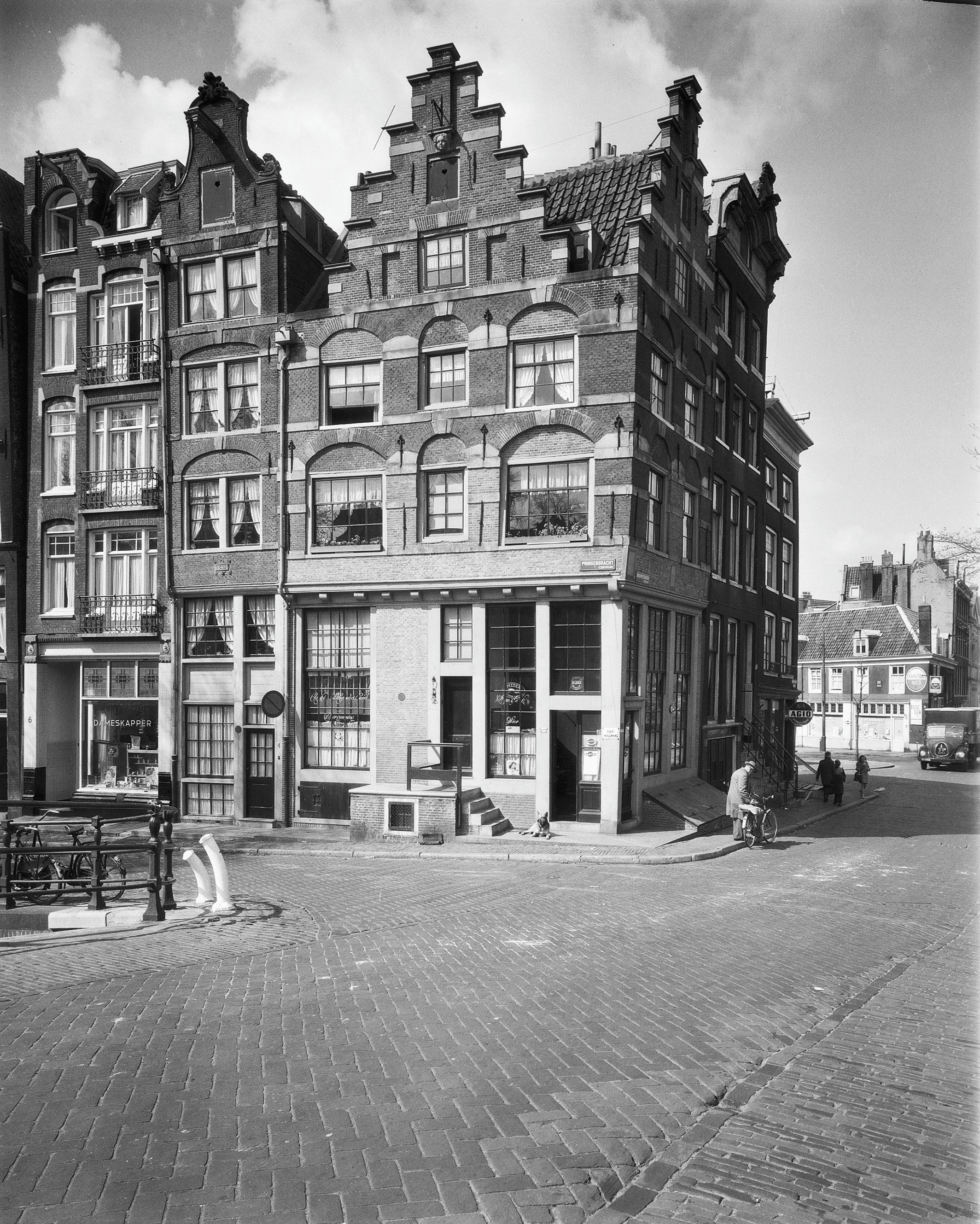
In 1615 Gerrit Reynst became the owner of an empty plot, now Prinsengracht 2-10; his heirs, two daughters who married Samuel Blommaert and Isaac Coymans, sold the lots in 1617, 1618 and 1622.

There are many monuments and monumental canal houses on the Prinsengracht, including:

- A crow-stepped gable on the corner with the Brouwersgracht at Prinsengracht 2–4.
- The van Brienenhofje, or Rk. St Van Brienens Founded The Star at Prinsengracht 89–133.
- A frame facade at Prinsengracht 124.
- 't Casteel van Beveren from around 1720 at Prinsengracht 299.
- The Anne Frank House from 1635 with the Secret Annex from 1740 at Prinsengracht 263 (near the Westertoren), later internally connected to expanded museum space in the adjacent Prinsengracht 265-267.
- 'De Roode Vos' with a clock gable at Prinsengracht 300.
- The Palace of Justice from 1829 at Prinsengracht 436.
- A typical example of a 19th-century so-called Ojief spout facade at Prinsengracht 556.
- The Prinsengracht Hospital at Prinsengracht 769.
- The best-preserved copy of five identical neck gables from 1701 at Prinsengracht 849.
- The 17th-century Deutzen Hofje at Prinsengracht 899.

=== Churches ===
- Between Prinsengracht 16 and 18 - at Westerstraat - there is the Noordermarkt with the Noorderkerk built around 1623.
- The Westerkerk with the Westertoren on Prinsengracht 281 (on the Westermarkt).
- Between Prinsengracht 1047 and 1049 - at the Utrechtsestraat - there is the Amstelveld with the special Amstelkerk, built as a temporary ‘Wooden barn’ in 1670.
- Prinsengracht 756 contains the De Duif church building from 1858. (Until 1974 it was the Catholic Sint-Willibrorduskerk within the Veste.)
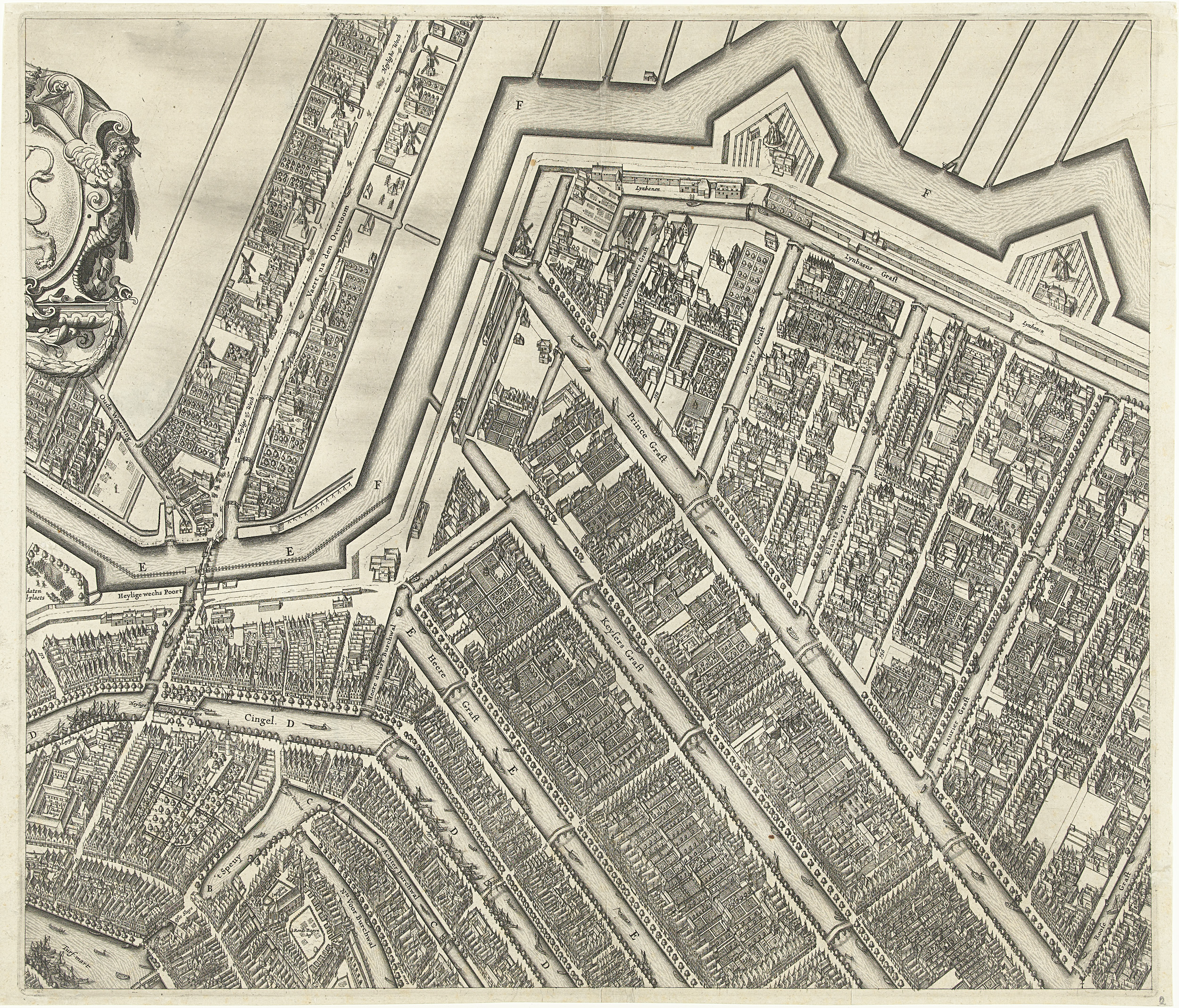
Map of Amsterdam by Balthasar Florisz. van Berckenrode (1625). Detail of the larger map with the still short Prinsengracht ending at the Leidsegracht (top center).

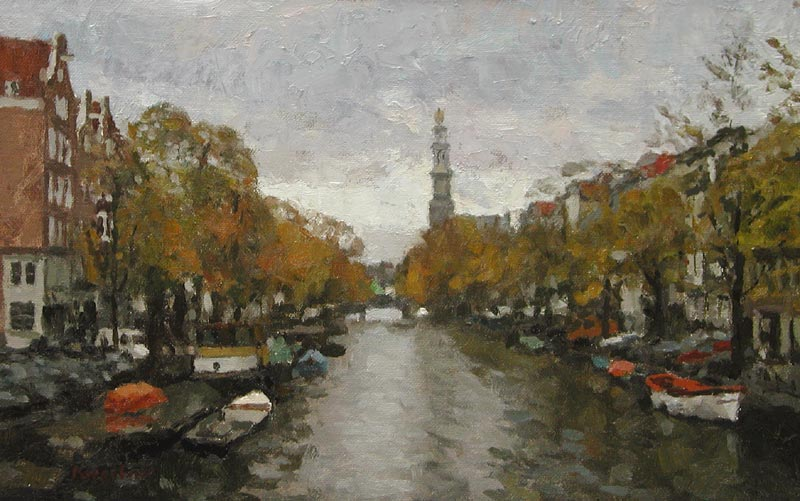
Prinsengracht with Westertoren, fall. Frans Koppelaar

== Numbering and orientation ==
The Prinsengracht starts in the north at the Brouwersgracht, bends parallel to the Keizersgracht to the southeast and flows into the Amstel. The odd numbered side of the canal is on the side of the heart of the city (Dam Square).

- At Prinsengracht 182 and 281 is the intersection with Rozengracht and Raadhuisstraat respectively
- At Prinsengracht 444 and 707 you will find the intersection with Leidsestraat (Filmtheater de Uitkijk is at number 452)
- At Prinsengracht 644 and 927 is the intersection with Vijzelgracht and Vijzelstraat respectively
- At Prinsengracht 806 and 1055 is the intersection with Utrechtsestraat
- To the east of the Prinsengracht, between the Raadhuisstraat and the Leidsegracht are the so-called Negen Straatjes (Nine Small Streets).

== Bridges ==
The Prinsengracht is spanned by 14 bridges, all fixed:

Number	Name	Street	Passage width	Passage height	Vertical clearance at 4m width	Managed by
59	Lekkeresluis	Brouwersgracht	6,95	2,79	2,30	Centrum
60	Prinsensluis	Prinsenstraat	6,82	2,10		Centrum
61	Leliesluis	Leliegracht	6,82	2,04		Centrum
63	Nieuwe-Wercksbrug	Westermarkt	7,00	2,10		DiVV
64	Reesluis	Reestraat	6,84	2,10		Centrum
65	Berensluis	Berenstraat	6,85	2,10		Centrum
66		Runstraat	6,84	2,06		Centrum
67	(Kleine Brouwerssluis)	Leidsegracht	7,00	2,05		Centrum
68	Aalmoezeniersbrug	Leidsestraat	7,19	2,02		DiVV
69	Antiquairbrug	Nieuwe Spiegelstraat	6,50	2,10		Centrum
70	Walenweeshuissluis	Vijzelstraat	6,85	2,10		DiVV
71	De Duifbrug	Reguliersgracht	6,70	2,64	2,14	Centrum
75		Utrechtsestraat	6,88	2,11		DiVV
76	Frans Hendricksz. Oetgensbrug	Amstel	7,00	2,70	2,26	Centrum

== See also ==
- Canals of Amsterdam
- Prinsengrachtconcert
