= Herman Hendrik Baanders =

Dutch architect (1849–1905)

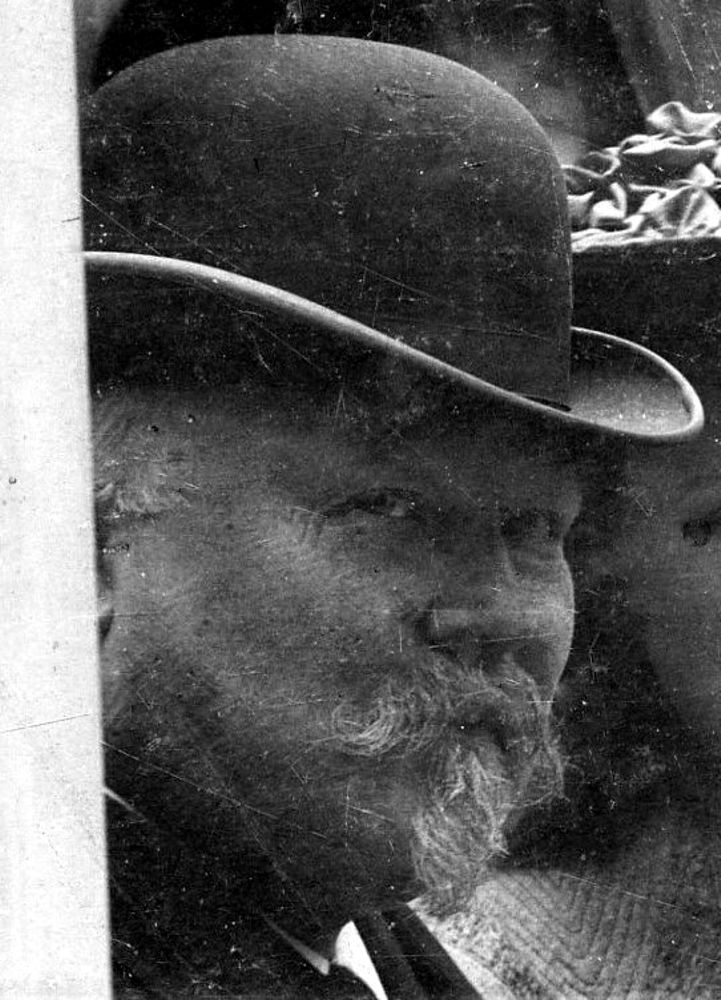
Herman Hendrik Baanders, c. 1890s

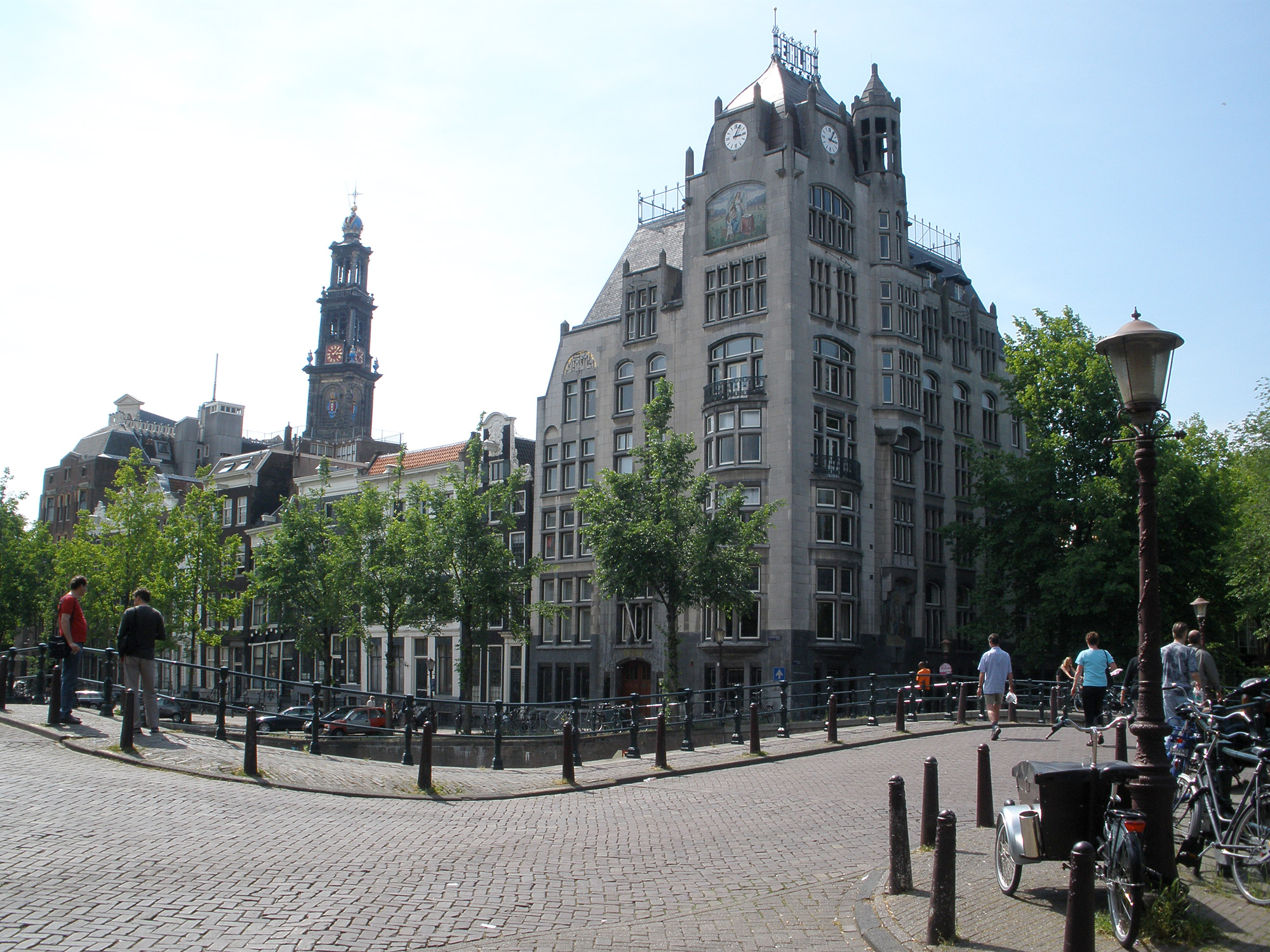
The Astoria building in Amsterdam

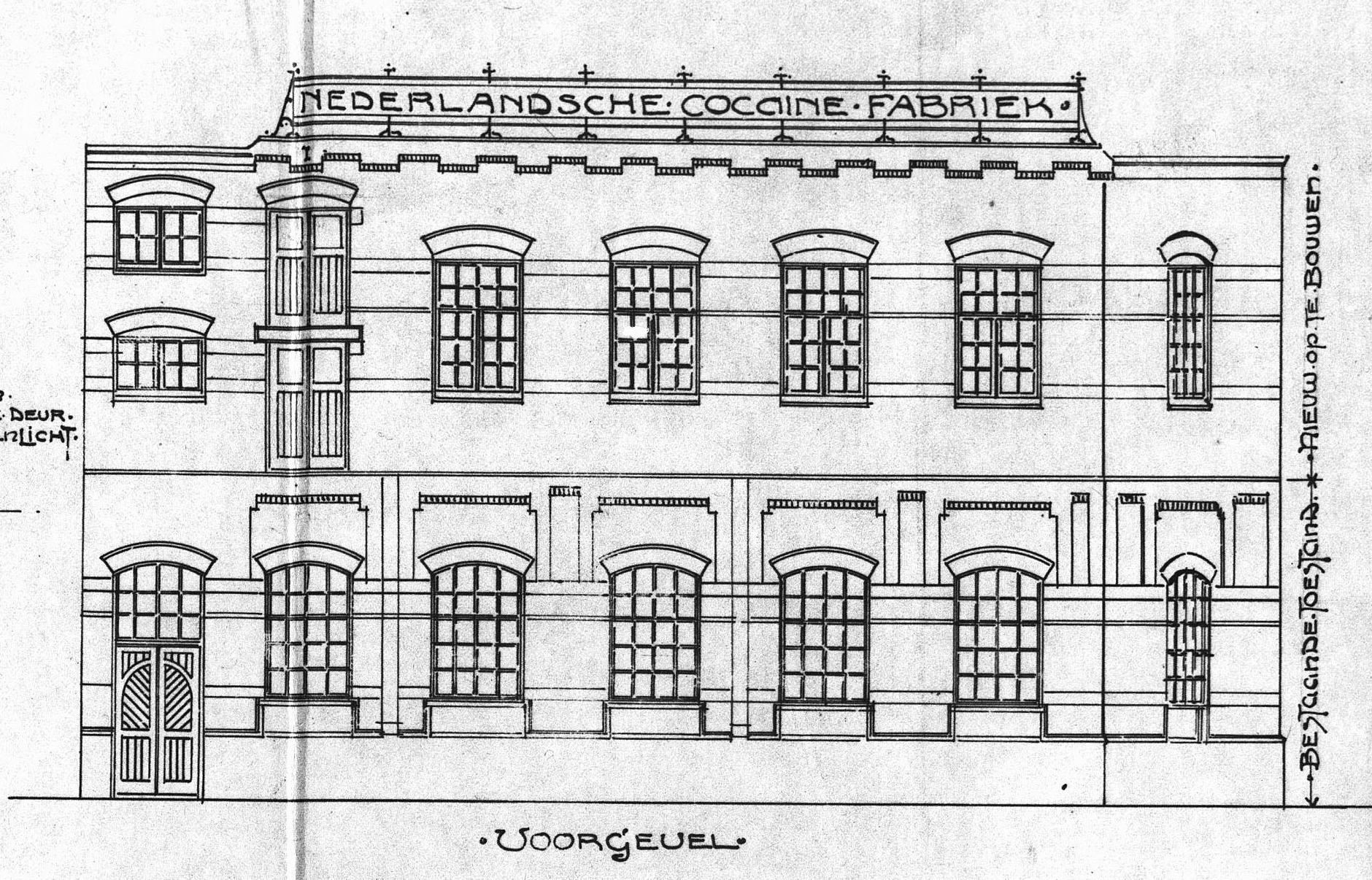
Designs for the 1902 expansion of the Nederlandsche Cocaïnefabriek, said to be the world's largest cocaine factory

Herman Hendrik Baanders (22 August 1849, in Zutphen – 31 March 1905, in Amsterdam), also known as Hermanus Hendrikus Baanders and H.H. Baanders, was a Dutch architect who was primarily active in Amsterdam.

Like many other architects around the fin de siècle, Baanders had an eclectic and historicizing style of architecture. For instance, he would use a traditional Dutch facade such as a neck-gable, but combine it with Jugendstil elements that were considered very new and modern at that time. Despite these Jugendstil elements, his work was grounded in the Neo-Renaissance of the 19th century, characterized by a high level of detail.

His most prestigious design was the Astoria building (1904–1905), a Jugendstil office building at Keizersgracht 174–176 in Amsterdam, built as the headquarters of the Eerste Hollandsche Levensverzekerings Bank insurance company. With six floors and a maximum height of 37 metres, the Astoria building was one of the first office towers in the Netherlands. Baanders designed this building together with Gerrit van Arkel. In 2001 it gained rijksmonument (national monument) status. Another design by Baanders and Van Arkel, a double house at Korte Marnixkade 4 (1893), has rijksmonument status as well.

Baanders also designed a number of houses with shops along Leliegracht canal as well as the Nederlandsche Cocaïnefabriek (1900, further expanded in 1902) which in 1910 was said to be the world's largest cocaine factory.

His sons Herman Ambrosius Jan Baanders (1876–1954) and Jan Baanders Sr. (1884–1966) were prominent architects of the Amsterdamse School style, and his daughter Tine Baanders (1890–1971) was a well-known graphic artist.

== Life and career ==
Baanders, the son of a weaver, was born and raised in the provincial town of Zutphen and trained as a carpenter. In 1871 he left Zutphen to try his luck in the capital of Amsterdam. While working as a carpenter in Amsterdam, he studied architecture (bouwkunde) in the evenings at the Industrieschool van de Maatschappij voor den Werkenden Stand. The first mention of Baanders as an architect was around 1885, although the first known design by him – for a house in the Swammerdamstraat in Amsterdam – dates to 1880, presumably made while he was still training to become an architect.

Initially, Baanders worked for other architects, but around 1890 he established himself as an independent architect. His first commissions were mainly houses in the new residential districts of Amsterdam that were under construction and expansion in the late 19th century, as well as factories and industrial complexes in Amsterdam and elsewhere.

In 1889, he was invited to join the architects' society Architectura et Amicitia. After that, he received more prestigious commissions, starting with a house at Lauriergracht 122 in 1889. In this later period, he designed villas and mansions in upscale parts of town like the suburb of Watergraafsmeer and the areas around the Vondelpark and Concertgebouw, as well as large housing blocks. In his final years (1904–1905) he worked with Gerrit van Arkel on the Astoria building, one of the first office towers in the Netherlands.

Baanders' company was located at Eerste Jan van der Heydenstraat 185 in Amsterdam. In 1892 the offices moved to Tweede Jan van der Heydenstraat 19, a year later to Sarphatipark 125, and finally, in 1904, to Ruysdaelkade 27. Baanders also had a workshop at Reguliersgracht 50.

He remained in Amsterdam until his death, with the exception of a brief period in Baarn around 1885. In 1875, he married Lena van den Berg (1848–1914) in Rotterdam. They had eight children. From 1903 he worked closely with his eldest son, Herman Ambrosius Jan Baanders (1876–1954), who took over the company after his death in 1905. Herman Ambrosius Jan Baanders and his brother Jan Baanders were prominent architects of the Amsterdamse School style and together designed the Blauwe Theehuis ("Blue Tea House") pavilion in the Vondelpark, among others. Herman Ambrosius Jan Baanders also designed the Amsterdams Lyceum. In 1953 the company was taken over by Jan Baanders' oldest son, Jan Baanders Jr.

H.H. Baanders' daughter Tine Baanders (1890–1971) was a graphic designer and illustrator who was a frequent contributor to the art magazine Wendingen. She exhibited her work in Amsterdam (1913, 1917), Rotterdam (1918), Haarlem (1919) and Paris (1925). At the Exposition Internationale des Arts Décoratifs et Industriels Modernes (1925 world's fair) in Paris, she was awarded a Diplôme de Médaille de Bronze.

== Buildings ==
Buildings in Amsterdam designed by Baanders include:

- House at Lauriergracht 122 (1889)
- Double house at Korte Marnixkade 4 (1893), with Gerrit van Arkel
- House at Leliegracht 24 (1895)
- House at Leliegracht 12 (1896)
- House at Schippersgracht 5 (1897)
- House at Leliegracht 22 (1899)
- Nederlandsche Cocaïnefabriek at Eerste Schinkelstraat 30 (1900)
- Double house at Paulus Potterstraat 40-42 (1901)
- Three villas at Van Eeghenstraat 84-88 (1902)
- House at Vijzelgracht 27 (1902)
- House at Leliegracht 31 (1903–1904)
- Astoria building at Keizersgracht 174-176 (1904–1905), with Gerrit van Arkel
