= Expo 2015 pavilions =

Coordinates: 45°31′7″N 9°6′24″E

This article contains the details of the pavilions in Expo 2015. The 2015 World Expo Milan covers more than 2.9 square kilometers and contains more than 70 exposition pavilions. More than 145 countries and 50 international organizations registered to participate in the 2015 Milan Expo.

== Theme pavilions ==
Pavilion Zero

There are 5 theme areas:

- Pavilion Zero, which serves as an introduction to the Expo;
- Future Food District which displays a modern and hyper-technological supermarket
- Children's park, an area dedicated to kids exploring the Expo theme
- a Biodiversity Park which includes a garden and two pavilions
- Arts & Foods: rituals since 1851 exhibition hosted at the satellite venue Triennale di Milano.

In addition the Media Center, which looks exactly like Pavilion Zero, welcomes visitors at the west entrance of the exhibition.

== National pavilions ==
147 of the world's 196 nations were represented at Expo 2015, either in stand-alone pavilions or within larger pavilions.

Country	Image	Designer	Description	Award(s)
=== Afghanistan ===		Fiera Milano	Eating for Longevity, Afghanistan Amazingly Real, a 125-metre section within the Spices cluster.	
=== Albania ===		Eduard Agostini (Edi Hila)	Our Food, Our Story, Our Mystery... within the Bio-Mediterraneum cluster	
=== Algeria ===	Mosaic on display in the Algerian pavilion	Studio De Ferrari Architetti and Buonomo Veglia	This pavilion's theme was Agricultural Heritage and Technological Development for Food Self-Sufficiency and describes how difficult hunting and obtaining water is in its arid conditions. There was also a food area which served cous cous and other offerings from the national cuisine.	
=== Angola ===		Paula Nascimento and Antonio Gameiro		BIE award 2nd place for theme development (over 2000 metres); 1st prize of the World Association of Agronomists
=== Argentina ===	The cafe area at Argentina pavilion	PICO	Theme 'Argentina feeds you'. The pavilion was designed to resemble four silos	
=== Austria ===	A wall within the Austrian pavilion	Klaus K. Loenhart of terrain:loenhart&mayr	The pavilion was a lush outdoor forest, giving visitors the opportunity to meander through and enjoy a breath of fresh air.	Exhibitor Magazine best pavilion honorable mention Exhibitor Magazine best interpretation of theme honorable mention BIE award winner for best display (under 2000 metres)
=== Azerbaijan ===	Expo Milano 2015 - Azerbaidjan pavilion	Simmetrico Network	Theme 'Protection of Organic Food and Biodiversity for Future Generations'	Exhibitor Magazine best small pavilion winner Honorable mention sustainability award for Design and Materials
=== Bahrain ===	Crockery from the 2nd and 3rd centuries	Designed by Anne Holtrop and Anouk Vogel	Contained 10 connected fruit gardens	Honorable mention sustainability award for Design and Materials; BIE award 2nd place for architecture and landscape (over 2000 metres)
=== Bangladesh ===			Theme 'Sustainability in Rice Production for Better Life Under Changing Climate' Includes information about rice capable of adapting to climate change developed by the Bangladesh Rice Research Institute	
=== Belarus ===			Theme: The Wheel of Life	
=== Belgium ===		Designed by Patrick Genard in collaboration with Marc Belderbos, construction by Besix - Vanhout		Exhibitor Magazine best exhibit honorable mention for The Cave; Honorable mention sustainability award for Design and Materials
=== Benin ===			Theme: At the Heart of Benin's Cuisine, Nutrition for a Life Bursting with Energy	
=== Bolivia ===			Theme: Quinoa, a Future Sown Thousands of Years Ago	
=== Brazil ===		Studio Arthur Casas		Exhibitor Magazine best 'Elements & Detail' honorable mention for The Net
=== Brunei ===			Theme Science and Technology for Food Safety, Security and Quality. Part of the spices cluster	
=== Burundi ===			Theme A Discovery of the Five Senses: Burundi, part of the coffee cluster	
=== Chile ===	Chile Pavilion	Undurraga Devés Arquitectos	The pavilion is a wooden box: a suspended structure with a large wooden lintel enclosed by a frame of crossed beams and supported by four concrete pillars that create an intermediate space and a clear horizon.	BIE award 2nd place for architecture and landscape (under 2000 metres)
=== China ===	China pavilion	Studio Link-Arc	The building's predominant feature is its complex roof form. From the front it appears to be a series of curves, while at the back it forms a row of rectilinear shapes.	Exhibitor Magazine' best exterior design honorable mention BIE award 3rd place for architecture and landscape (over 2000 metres)
=== Colombia ===	Colombia pavilion	Theme Concept: Mauricio Cárdenas, Studio Cárdenas; Architecture Concept: Manuel Villa Arquitectos; Architectural Design: Mauricio Cárdenas, Studio Cárdenas	The Colombia Pavilion theme was "Naturally Sustainable", a concept that was experienced throughout the exhibition of the five thermal floors the country has: hot, temperate, cold, moorland and perennial snow. The possibility of having a stable temperature during 365 days, allows the country to be a constant food producer, a breadbasket of the world. The archietecture of the pavilion was inspired in Colombia's geography having 4 modules of different height and extension.	Colombia Pavilion received second place in the category "Best heritage for future generations" special prize given by the World Association of Agronomists at the Class Expo Pavilion Heritage Award.
=== Czech Republic ===	Czech Pavilion	Chybík + Kristof		BIE award 3rd place for architecture and landscape (under 2000 metres)
=== Dominican Republic ===			Theme: Empowering Family Farmers so They Can Feed Themselves, Their Communities, and the World and part of the coffee cluster. The pavilion was run by the Laboratorio de Arquitectura Dominicana (LAD)	
=== Egypt ===			Theme EGYPT, the Never Ending Story	
=== Estonia ===	Estonia	Kadarik Tüür Arhitektid	Theme Gallery of	BIE award 3rd place for best display (under 2000 metres)
=== France ===		XTU Architects		Exhibitor Magazine editor's choice honorable mention BIE award winner for architecture and landscape (over 2000 metres)
=== Germany ===	PVC membrane trees with integrated photovoltaic cells German pavilion	Schmidhuber	The German pavilion attempted to reproduce the landscape of the typical rural areas of its country; stylized trees emerged from the ground alongside the external exhibition area. The largest pavilion at Expo 2015	Exhibitor Magazine best pavilion winner Exhibitor Magazine best activity/interactive winner for Seed Boards; Exhibitor Magazine best use of technology honorable mention for Photovoltaic Cells; BIE award winner for theme development (over 2000 metres)
=== Guatemala ===			Theme The Heart of the Mayan World. Part of the coffee cluster.	
=== Hungary ===	Pavilion of Hungary	Attila Ertsey and Herczeg Ágnes Sándor Sárkány	Theme From The Purest Sources	
=== India ===			India participated via the Basmati pavilion in the rice cluster	
=== Indonesia ===			Theme The stage of the world	
=== Iran ===				BIE award 2nd place for best display (under 2000 metres)
=== Ireland ===				BIE award 3rd place for theme development (under 2000 metres)
=== Israel ===	The Israeli field wall covering the pavilion The Israeli pavilion's entrance	David Knafo	The Israeli pavilion introduced the technological agriculture in Israel, was called "Fields of Tomorrow", and its presenter was Israeli Moran Atias	Exhibitor Magazine best exterior design honorable mention Honorable mention sustainability award for Design and Materials
=== Italy ===		Nemesi & Partners		
=== Japan ===	Japan Pavilion (with Monaco's beyond)	Hakuhodo Design Inc.	The pavilions symbol was 6 iwaibashi (chopsticks with two thin ends) arranged to form an 'E' The pavilion was designed to represent a 'bowl of diversity' and constructed with three-dimensional wooden grid made by combining traditional Japanese wooden framework with recent understanding of compressive strain	Exhibitor Magazine best presentation winner for Harmony; BIE award winner for best installation (over 2000 metres)
=== Kazakhstan ===		Facts and Fiction GmbH		Exhibitor Magazine best activity/interactive honorable mention for Interactive Floor Relief; Exhibitor Magazine editor's choice winner BIE award 3rd place for theme development (over 2000 metres)
=== Kuwait ===				Exhibitor Magazine best 'Elements & Detail' honorable mention for Dhow Sails; Exhibitor Magazine people's choice honorable mention
=== Lebanon ===			Theme: Cuisine: the Lebanese Art & Soul, part of the Bio-Mediterraneum cluster.	
=== Lithuania ===	Expo Milano 2015 - Lituania		Theme: Well of Knowledge: Experienced Future	
=== Malaysia ===	pavilion		Theme Towards a Sustainable Food Ecosystem; The pavilion comprises 4 structures designed to resemble seeds, and made is from glued laminated timber	
=== Mexico ===	Mexico	Francisco Lopez Guerra	The pavilion is a volume wrapped by structures that resemble the dried corn husks	Exhibitor Magazine best use of technology honorable mention for Bar Code Stickers; Exhibitor Magazine editor's choice honorable mention BIE award 2nd place for theme development (under 2000 metres)
=== Monaco ===	Jellyfish aquarium in the Monaco pavilion	Enrico Pollino was the architect and Facts and Fiction designed the space.	After Expo 2015 the pavilion was intended to be dismantled and re-erected in Burkina Faso as a Red Cross building	Exhibitor Magazine best interpretation of theme honorable mention
=== Morocco ===			2nd or 3rd prize of the World Association of Agronomists	
=== Nepal ===		Implementing Expert Group (IEG) (who also designed Nepal's pavilions at the 1988, 1990, 2000 and 2010 expos	Theme Food security and sustainable development	
=== Netherlands ===		Totems Amsterdam	The pavilion is a sort of Luna Park composed of a sequence of spaces of different sizes and colours, each one able to host exhibitions and events in an open, free-flowing arrangement.	Award for "Less expensive and most commercial pavilion"
=== Oman ===				
=== Poland ===	Expo Milano 2015 - Pavilion of Poland	Piotr Musiałowski		
=== Qatar ===				Exhibitor Magazine best activity/interactive honorable mention for Interactive Food Table; Exhibitor Magazine people's choice winner
=== Romania ===				
=== Russia ===		Speech Architecture		BIE award 3rd place for best installation (over 2000 metres)
=== Slovakia ===	Slovakia pavilion	Karol Kállay	Slovakia. Recharge yourself	
=== Slovenia ===	Slovenia pavilion	SoNo Arhitekti	Theme I feel SLOVENIA. Green, active and healthy	
=== South Korea ===	South Korea display	Archiban	Theme Hansik, Food for the Future:You are What You Eat. The pavilion is inspired by traditional Korean pottery, being built in the form of an enormous "Moon Jar"	BIE silver award for exhibition design or for best installation (over 2000 metres)
=== Spain ===	Expo Milano 2015 - Spain	Designed by b720 - Fermín Vázquez Arquitectos		
=== Switzerland ===	Commodities given away at the Swiss pavilion	Netwerch		Exhibitor Magazine best exhibit honorable mention for San Gottardo — Acqua per l'Europa; Exhibitor Magazine best interpretation of theme winner
=== Thailand ===	Thailand entrance			
=== Turkey ===			The pavilion consisted of 3 main divisions of indoor, semi-outdoor and outdoor venues on a total area of 4.170-square-meter, which includes 7 semi-outdoor distinct chambers	
=== United Arab Emirates ===		Foster and Partners	After Expo 2015 the pavilion is to be demounted and reerected in Masdar City	Exhibitor Magazine best pavilion honorable mention Exhibitor best exterior design winner*Exhibitor Magazine people's choice honorable mention
=== United Kingdom ===	Outside the UK pavilion	Wolfgang Buttress	The pavilion is called "The Hive"	Exhibitor Magazine best exhibit winner for The Hive; International Jury prize BIE award winner for architecture and landscape (under 2000 metres)
=== United States ===	Vertical farm on the outside of the USA pavilion	Designed by Biber Architects	The pavilion is a multi-level building which includes a vertical farm	Exhibitor Magazine best 'Elements & Detail' winner for Vertical Farm
=== Vatican City ===	Vatican Pavilion	Quattro Associati	Theme Not by Bread Alone. At the Lord's Table with all Mankind	BIE award winner for theme development (under 2000 metres)
=== Vietnam ===	Vietnam pavilion	Vo Trong Nghia	Theme Water and Lotus	

== Clusters ==
Expo 2015 was the first universal expo at which countries that didn't self-build were grouped by theme or supply chain rather than geography into one of nine clusters.

Cluster	Image	Designer	Theme	Participants
=== Arid zones ===	Arid Zones Cluster		Agriculture and Nutrition in Arid Zones (Supply chain)	Djibouti, Eritrea, Jordan, Mauritania, Mali, Palestine, Senegal, Somalia and the UN
=== Bio-Mediterraneum ===	Bio-Mediterraneum		Bio-Mediterraneum - Health, Beauty and Harmony (Theme)	
=== Cereals and Tubers ===	Cereals and tubers		Cereals and Tubers – Old and New Crops (Supply chain)	
=== Cocoa and Chocolate ===		Fabrizio Leoni, Mauricio Cardenas, and Cesare Ventura for the concept and exhibition layout	Cocao and Chocolate – the Food of Gods (Supply chain)	Cameroon, Côte d'Ivoire, Cuba, Gabon, Ghana, São Tomé and Príncipe and the UN
=== Coffee ===	Coffee cluster		Coffee - the Engine of Ideas (Supply chain)	
=== Fruits and Legumes ===	Cluster fruits and legumes		Fruits and Legumes (Supply chain)	
=== Islands, Sea, and Food ===			Islands, Sea, and Food (Theme)	
=== Rice ===	Rice	Agnese Rebaglio, Davide Crippa, Barbara Di Prete and Francesco Tosi	Abundance and Security (Supply chain)	Bangladesh, Cambodia, Lao People's Democratic Republic, Myanmar, Sierra Leone, the Basmati Pavilion and a UN display
=== Spices ===	Spices cluster	The World of Spices (Supply chain)		

== Corporate pavilions ==
The Milan World Expo had a number of corporate pavilions.

Company	Image	Designer	Description
=== Coca-Cola Company ===			
=== Coop ===			
=== Enel Pavilion ===			
=== Love It - Copagri ===		EMBT	
=== OVS and Coin Excelsior Pavilions ===		Zito+Pedron Architects	The pavilions designed by Marco Zito and Alessandro Pedron consist of two semi-identical "L" rotated by 180° and placed next to each other, almost interlocking. The metal façades are made of brushed aluminum and etched corten sheets. It serves as the official gift shop for the Expo.
=== Slow Food Pavilion ===		Herzog & De Meuron	
=== Vanke ===		Daniel Libeskind	
=== Waterstone - Intesa Sanpaolo Pavilion ===		aMDL	
=== Intesa Sanpaolo Bancomat Pavilion ===		D2U	

== Other pavilions ==
Almost 50 international organisations participanted in the expo, some had their own pavilions, and some were shared.

Organisation	Image	Notes
=== Caritas ===	Caritas's pavilion	Caritas's pavilion was designed by Piuarch consisted of stacked white boxes
=== Don Bosco ===		At the end of the expo the pavilion was intended to be dismantled then transported to Ukraine to continue Don Bosco's work
=== Duomo factory ===	Duomo factory pavilion	A pavilion for the Venerable Factory of the Duomo of Milan
=== EU ===	The EU pavilion	Received an honorable mention for its presentation The Golden Ear,
=== Save the Children ===	Save The Children	Save the Children
=== UN ===	One of the UN's displays	
=== WAA-CONAF ===	WAA-CONAF pavilion	A pavilion designed by Enzo Eusebi shared by World Association of Agronomists and CONAF

== Taiwan Pavilion ==
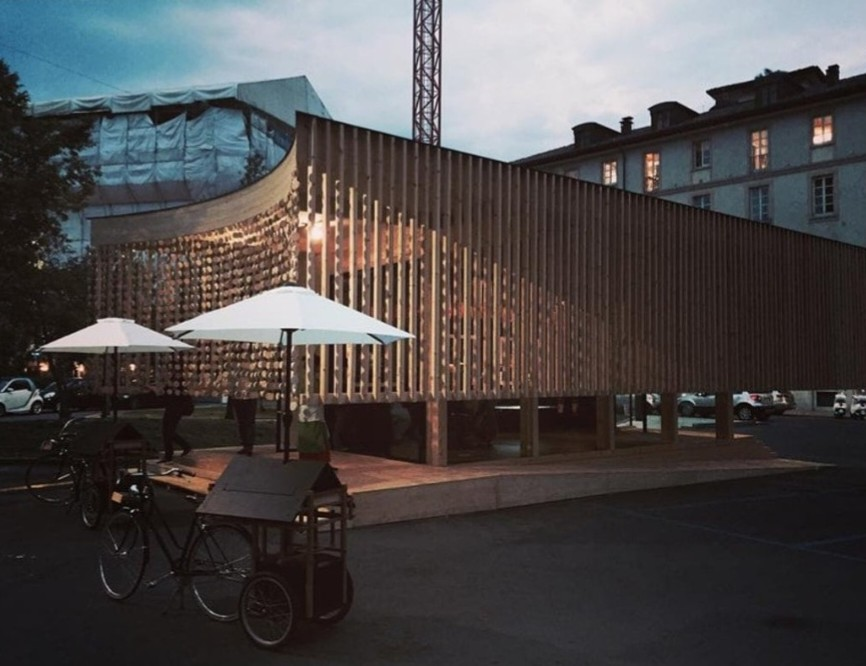
Taiwan Pavilion
