= Herman Ambrosius Jan Baanders =

Dutch architect (1873 - 1953)

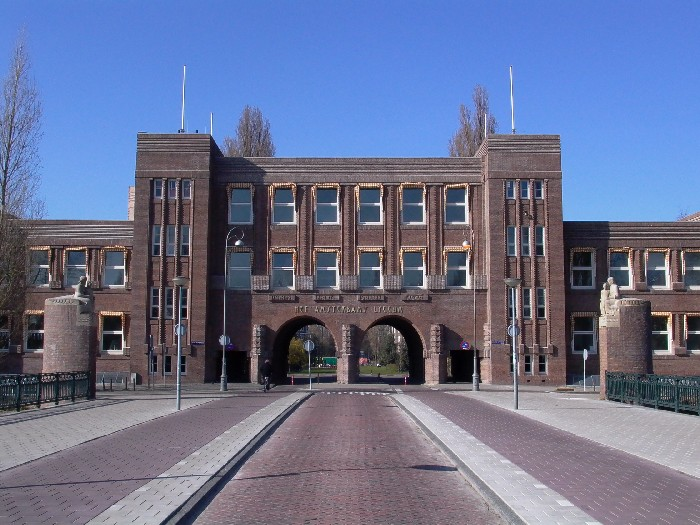
The Amsterdams Lyceum (1917-1920)

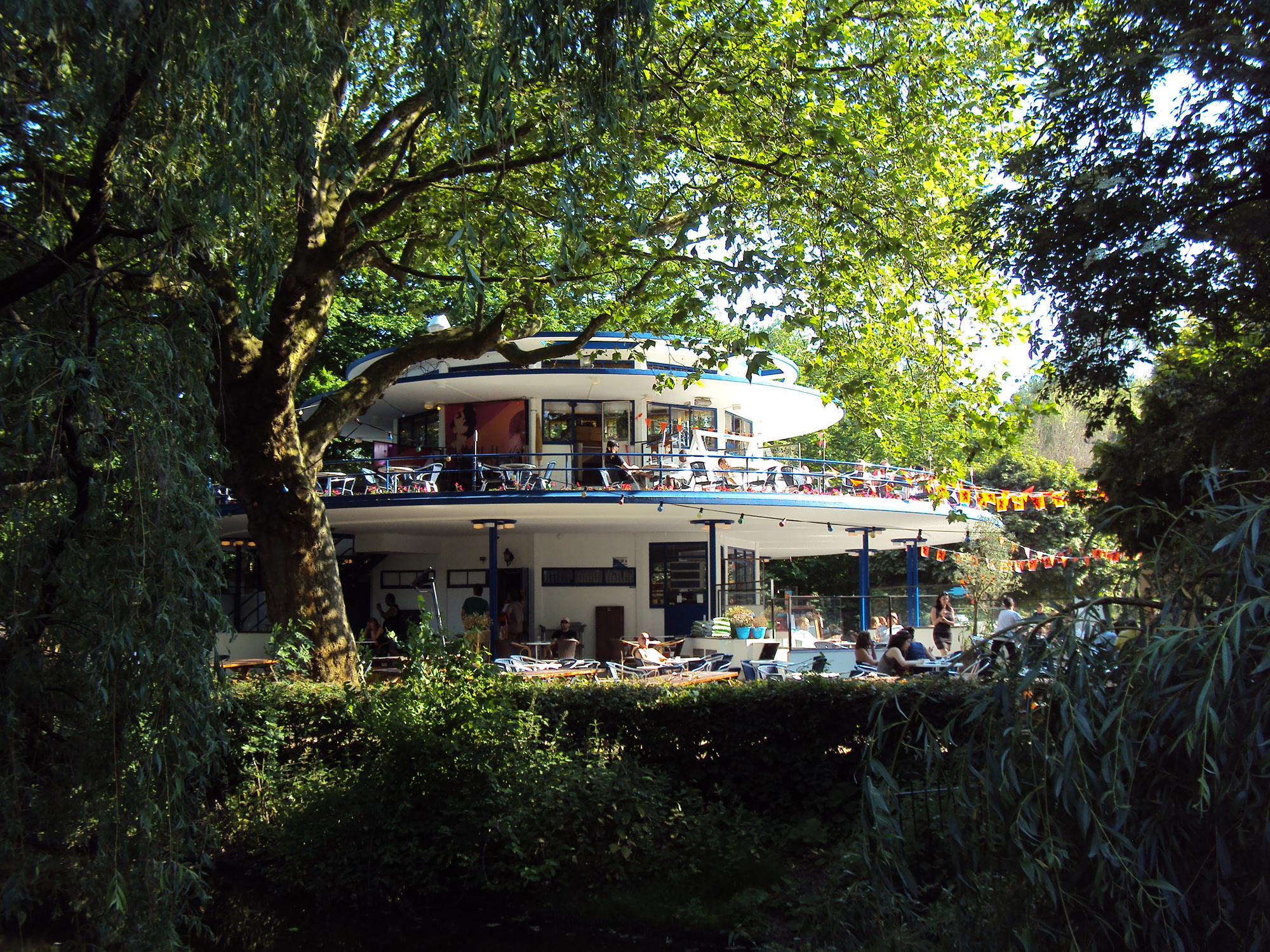
The Blauwe Theehuis (1937)

Herman Ambrosius Jan Baanders (Amsterdam, 13 February 1876 – Amsterdam, 27 May 1953), also known by his initials as H.A.J. Baanders, was a Dutch architect, designer and entrepreneur who was active in the Amsterdamse School style of architecture. He designed the Amsterdams Lyceum, among others.

Baanders' most significant contribution to the development of the Amsterdamse School style was a number of buildings outside Amsterdam during the early phase of the movement. His firm was also the starting point for the careers of a number of prominent Amsterdamse School architects, such as Michel de Klerk, Cornelis Blaauw, J. Zietsma, and Willem Maas.

In Amsterdam a street has been named for him, the H.A.J. Baanderskade in Zeeburg.

== Life and career ==
H.A.J. Baanders followed in the footsteps of his father, the architect Herman Hendrik Baanders (1849–1905). Like his father, he studied architecture (bouwkunde) at the Industrieschool van de Maatschappij voor den Werkenden Stand in Amsterdam. After completing his studies, he worked for his father as well as for the architect Pierre Cuypers. In 1899 he settled in The Hague, where he was employed by the government agency in charge of schools and other educational buildings. In 1903 Baanders returned to Amsterdam to assist his father.

In addition to architecture, he was also active in furniture and interior design. He was instructed in batik design by Maurits Greshoff and showed his batik work at an exhibition of Dutch decorative arts held in 1904 at the Museum of Decorative Arts in Copenhagen. He also wrote an article on batik, "Over de toepassing der batik-kunst in Nederland" ("On the Application of Batik Art in the Netherlands"), published in the volume De batik-techniek (1900).

After the death of his father in 1905, Baanders took over his father's architectural firm and carpentry workshop. The first mention of Baanders as an independent architect was in 1906, when he moved his offices from Ruysdaelkade 27 to Prinsengracht 955, in a building designed by Baanders himself. From 1909, his offices were at Herengracht 495. The company moved next-door, to Herengracht 493, in 1924. After World War II, the company returned to Herengracht 425.

In 1906 he co-founded a real estate investment bank, the Nederlandsche Grondbriefbank. He also chaired the Amsterdam architects' society Architectura et Amicitia, succeeding Willem Kromhout. After joining the board of Architectura et Amicitia in 1907, he became secretary in 1908, vice chairman in 1909 and chairman in 1910, serving until 1912. His business network as head of the Nederlandsche Grondbriefbank and his prominence in the architects' society Architectura et Amicitia led to larger and more prestigious commissions, and in the years that followed, the company grew to become one of the largest architectural firms in Amsterdam. In 1911 his brother Jan Baanders joined him as a partner in the firm and from 1915 the company operated under the name "Architectenbureau H.A.J. en Jan Baanders".

Baanders mainly designed offices and factories, both in Amsterdam and other towns, as well as villas and country homes for the wealthy owners of the companies that commissioned those offices and factories. These stately homes were located mainly around the Vondelpark and in affluent areas around Amsterdam, such as Bloemendaal, Aerdenhout and the Gooi. Major projects of the firm in the period up to the mid-1920s included the district of Heijplaat in the harbour of Rotterdam (1912-1921) — originally built as a garden city (tuindorp) to house the employees of the Rotterdamsche Droogdok Maatschappij shipping company — and the Amsterdam secondary school Amsterdams Lyceum (1917-1922). The building projects in this period were clearly influenced by the Amsterdamse School. From the mid-1920s onwards, Baanders' firm also worked on large-scale housing projects in Amsterdam.

The firm remained active during the crisis years of the 1930s. The Baanders brothers' designs in this period include the Blauwe Theehuis ("Blue Tea House"), a Modernist circular pavilion in Amsterdam's Vondelpark (1937). The firm also worked on large-scale housing projects around Den Helder and Wieringermeer. During World War II, the firm's output dropped considerably, and it remained low even after the end of the war. By this time, Baanders had reached his seventies.

Most likely, H.A.J. Baanders had wished his son Frans Baanders to succeed him as head of the company. After his death in 1953, however, his brother Jan Baanders took over as sole director, and ultimately Jan's son (Jan Baanders Jr.) became head of the firm.
