= Brouwerij 't IJ =

Dutch brewery

- Location: Amsterdam, Netherlands
- Coordinates: 52°22′0″N 4°55′35″E
- Opened: 1985
- Parent: Duvel Moortgat
- Website: www.brouwerijhetij.nl

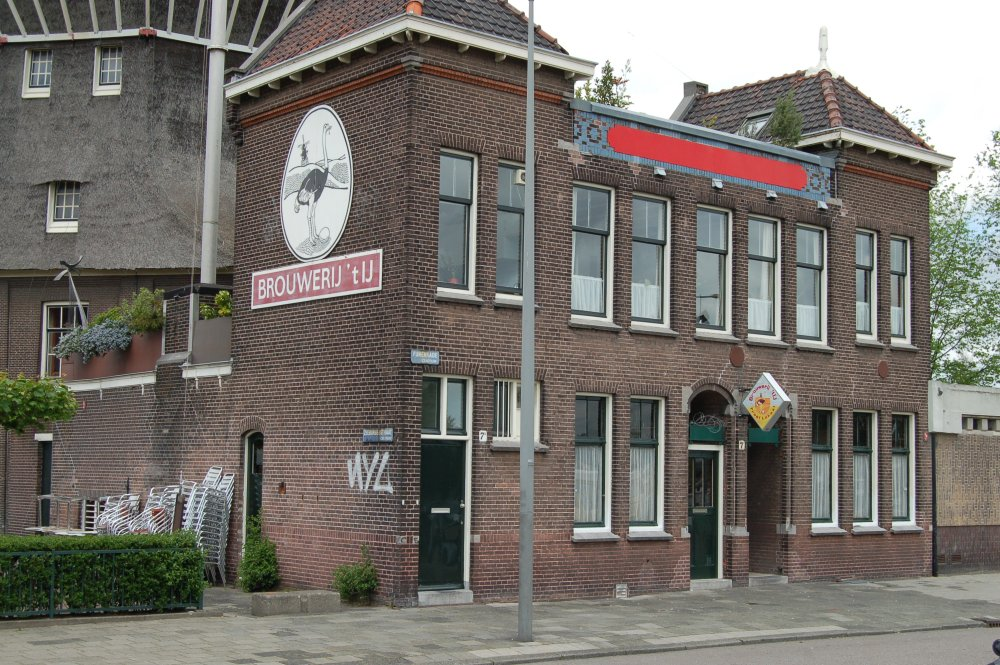
Brewery and pub in 2006

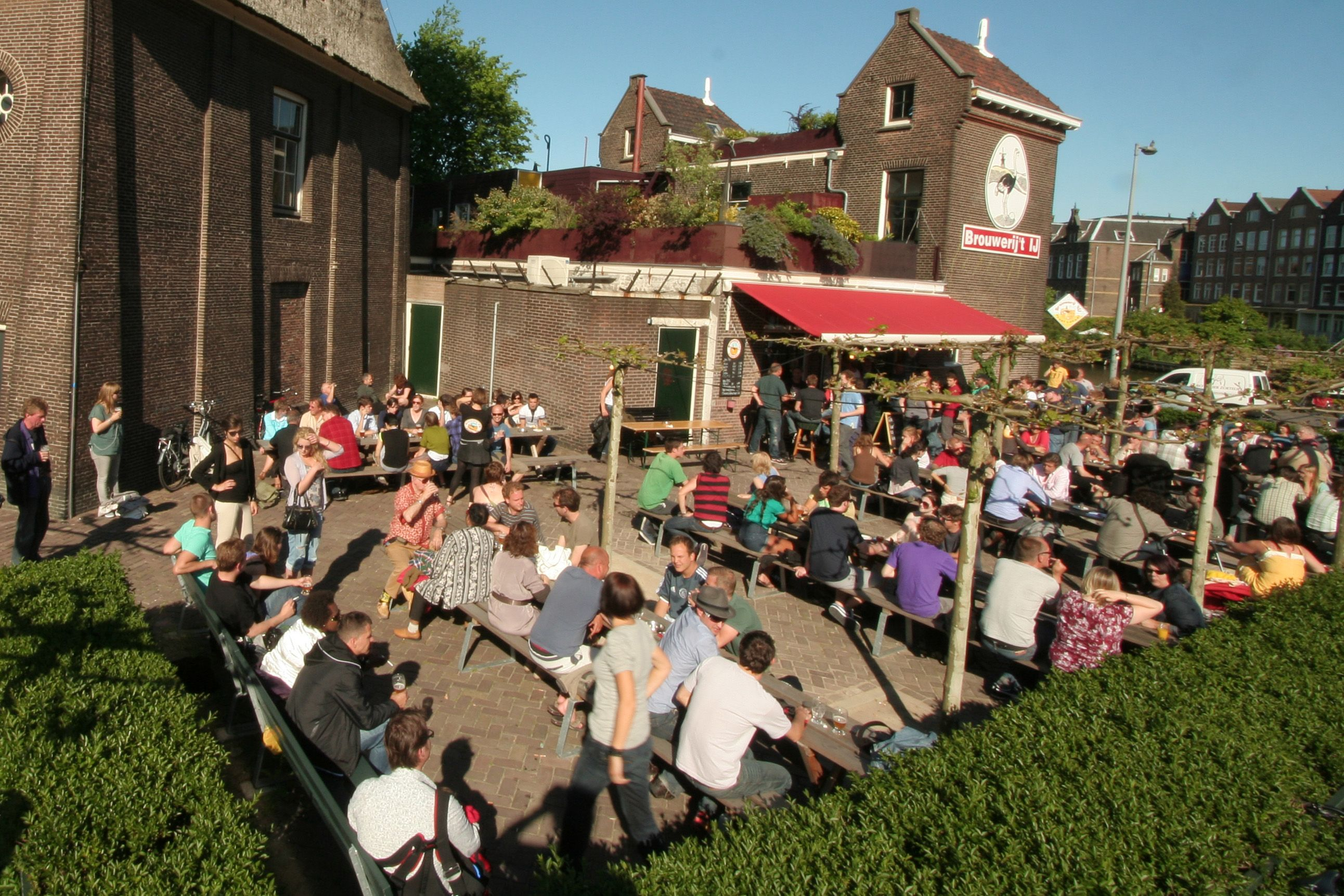
Outdoor area of the pub in 2010

Brouwerij 't IJ (Dutch pronunciation: [ˌbrʌu.əˈrɛi ət ˈɛi]; English: The IJ Brewery) is a small brewery in Amsterdam, Netherlands. It is located in a former bath house named Funen, next to the De Gooyer windmill. Its name is a reference to the IJ in Amsterdam, a body of water considered to be city's waterfront. The brewery was opened by Kaspar Peterson, a former musician, in October 1985 and was one of several small breweries that opened in cities around the Netherlands in response to consumers' dissatisfaction with beer brewed by the larger companies. It brews twelve standard beers and three seasonal beers, besides limited edition beers.

The brewery allows tours and tastings, and has a pub with an outdoor terrace. It opens from 2 p.m. until 8 p.m. but no later, owing to local residents' objections to the noise. It brews in the pub basement and in a building in the nearby Zeeburgerpad. In 2019 it opened a second bar in the Blauwe Theehuis in the Vondelpark.

The brewery's logo features an ostrich, with an egg, and a distant windmill.

== Beers ==
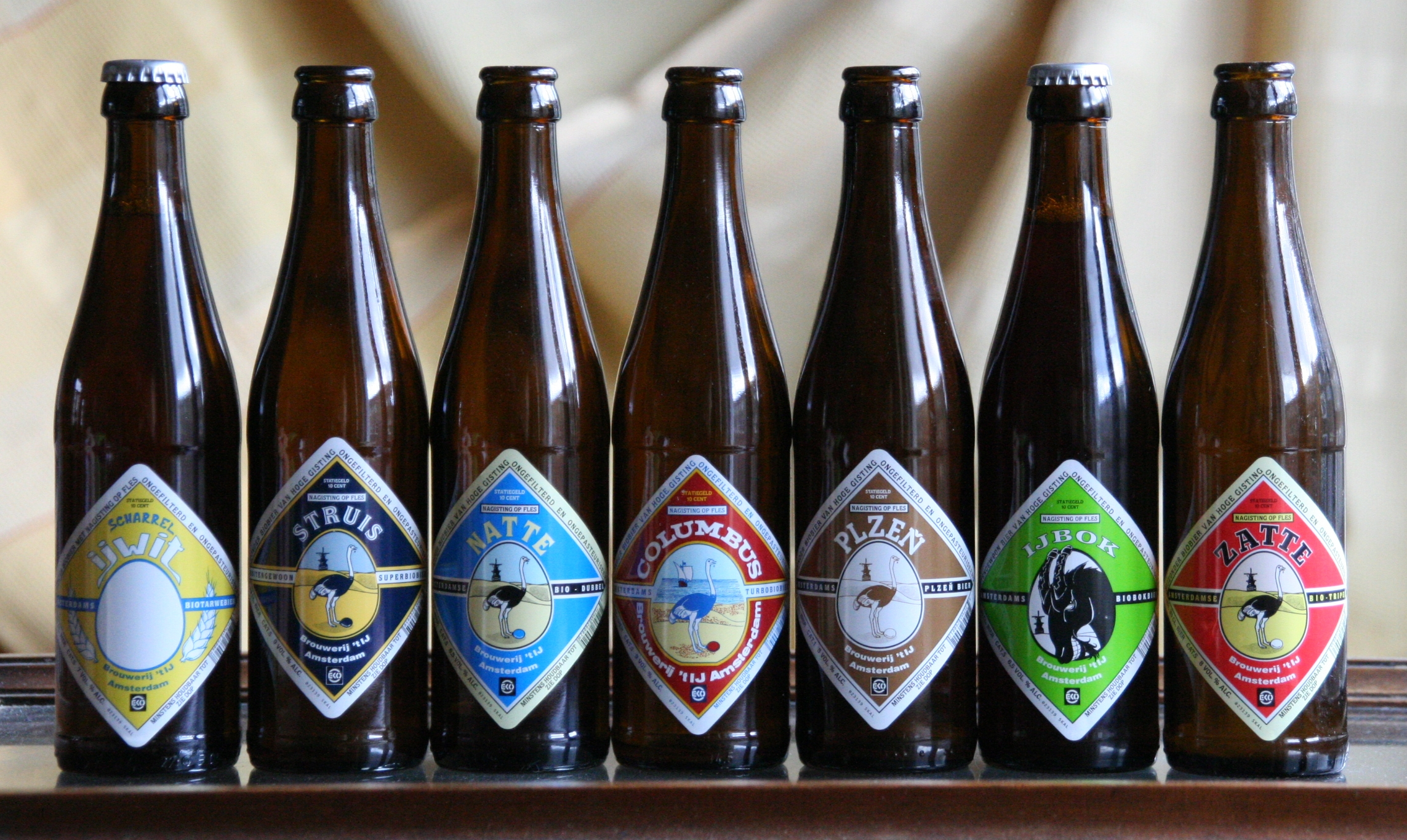
The IJ range in 2008

The brewery produces twelve standard beers and three seasonal beers. The standard beers Natte, Zatte, Columbus, and Struis are certified organic.

=== Standard beers ===
The twelve standard beers are:

- Blondie (5.8%)
- Biri (4.7%)
- Columbus (9%): amber with much hop
- Flink (4.7%)
- Free IPA (0.5%)
- I.P.A. (6.5%)
- IJwit (6.5%): white beer
- Natte (6.5%): a brown/red dubbel
- Session IPA (4%)
- Struis (9%): sweet and dark
- Vrijwit (0.5%)
- Zatte (8%): yellow/gold tripel

=== Seasonal beers ===
The three seasonal beers are:

- IJbock (6,5%): dark bock beer
- Paasij (7%): amber coloured springbock
- IJndejaars (Varies per year) (9%)
