= Astoria (Amsterdam) =

- Location within Amsterdam

General information
- Type: Office building, Historical landmark
- Location: Keizersgracht 174-176, Amsterdam, Netherlands
- Coordinates: 52.375363°N 4.885495°E

Website
- Astoria

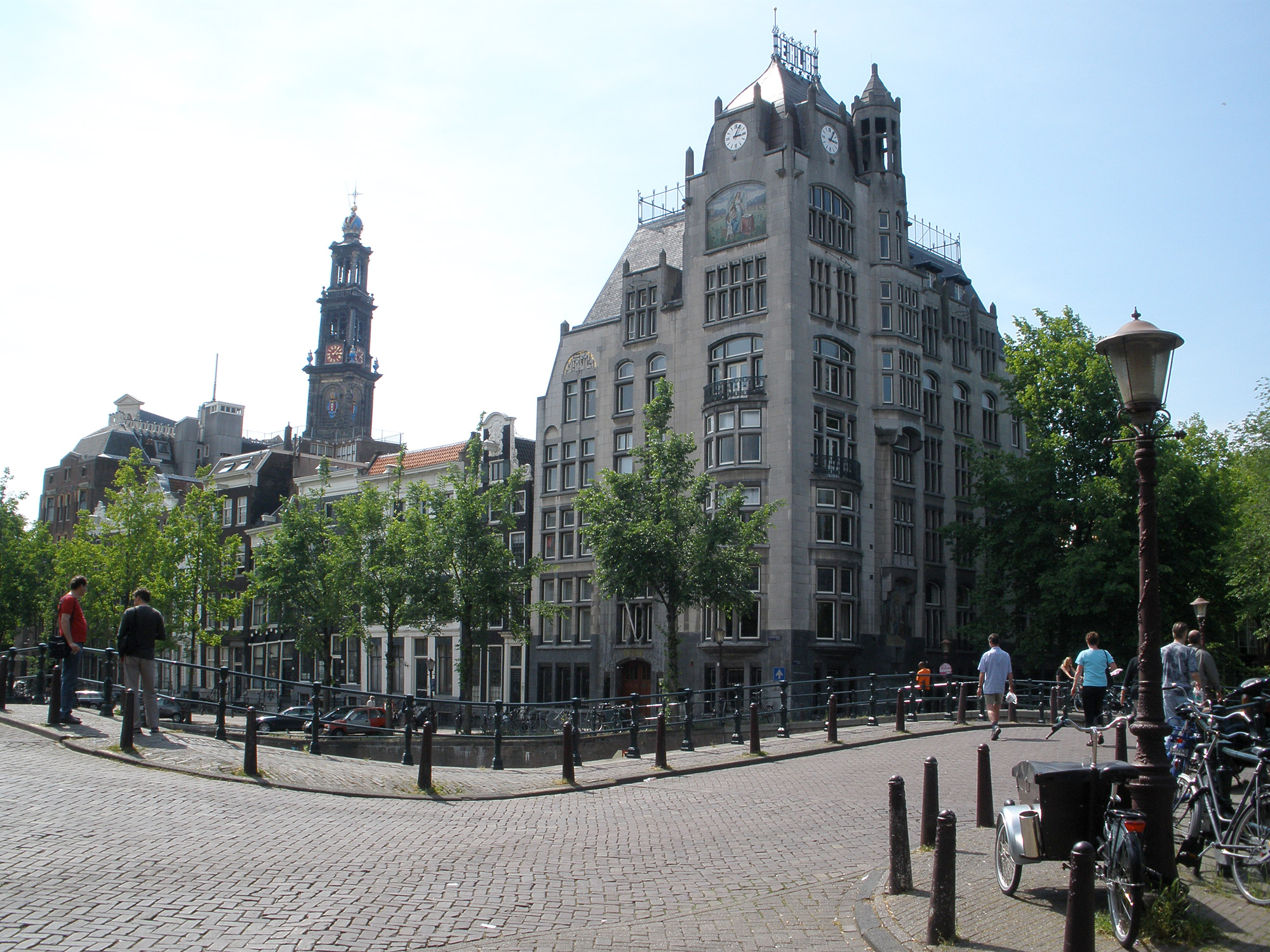
The Astoria building in Amsterdam

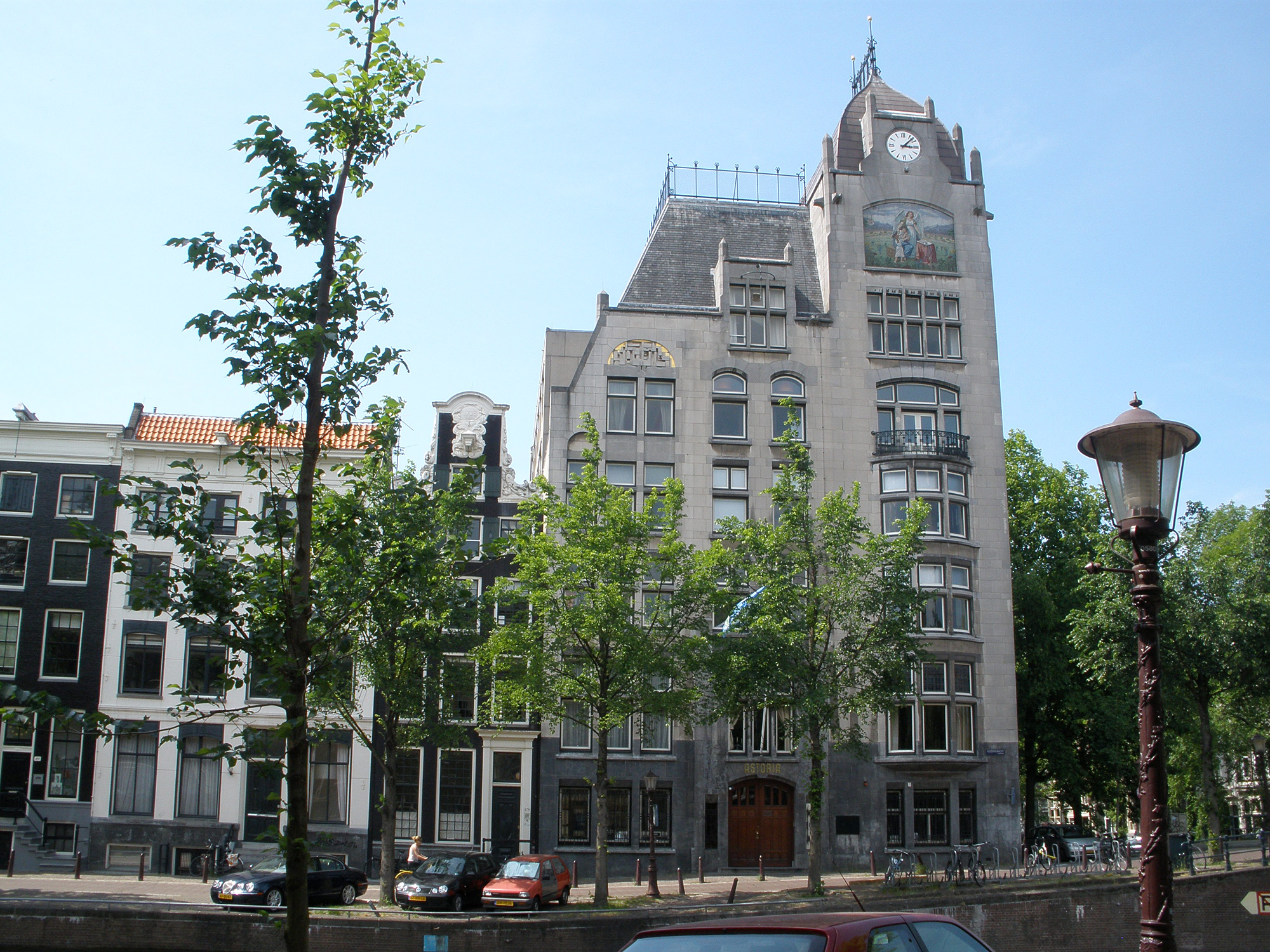
The Keizersgracht facade

Astoria is a Jugendstil office building at Keizersgracht 174–176 in Amsterdam, built in 1904–1905 as the headquarters of the Eerste Hollandsche Levensverzekerings Bank insurance company. The building, at the intersection of the Keizersgracht and Leliegracht canals, served as the international headquarters of Greenpeace for 15 years. In 2001, it gained rijksmonument (national monument) status.

== Description ==
With six floors and a maximum height of 37 metres, the Astoria building was one of the first office towers in the Netherlands. The building was a design by H.H. Baanders and Gerrit van Arkel, two architects who designed many buildings in Amsterdam in a sobre version of Jugendstil which later came to be known as Nieuwe Kunst ("New Art").

The Astoria building has a copper-plated roof with a small tower and decorative cast-iron fencing with EHLB (for Eerste Hollandsche Levensverzekerings Bank) in gold lettering. The mosaic on the Keizersgracht facade shows a guardian angel (intended to be symbolic of the insurance company) and two other figures.

In 1968–1969, the building was extended in the same style, after a design by architect C. Wegener Sleeswijk.

Astoria served for 15 years as the international headquarters of Greenpeace, from the founding of Greenpeace International in 1989. The building now houses various companies.

The Astoria building is on the same block as the Anne Frank House.

== Sources ==
- Amsterdam Bureau Monumenten & Archeologie (Dutch)
- Astoria, Keizersgracht 174-176 (En)
