= Nederlandsche Cocaïnefabriek =

Dutch pharmaceutical company

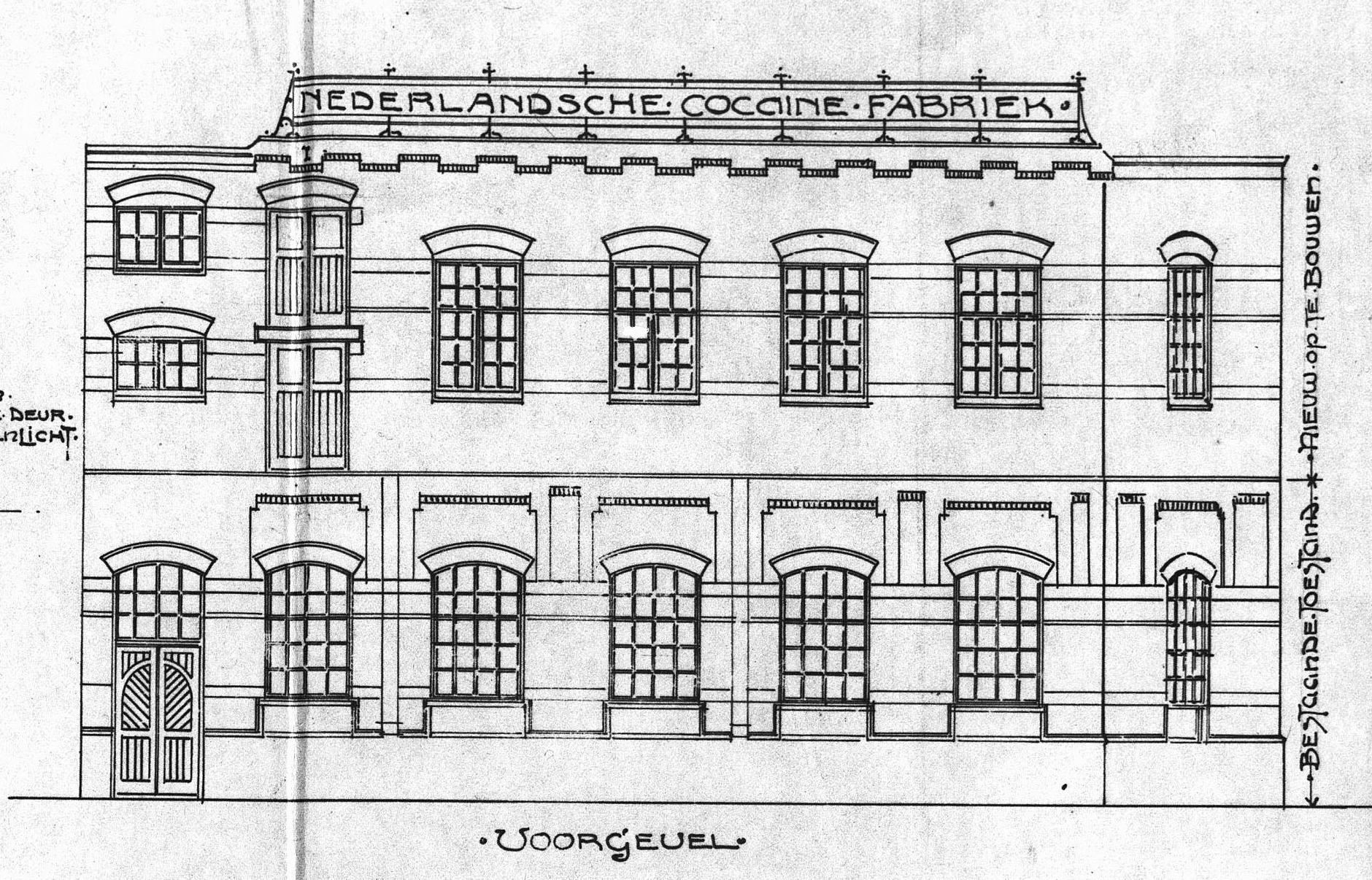
Detail of the architect's plans for the 1902 factory extensions

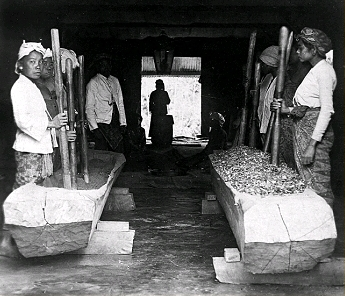
Workers in Java processing coca leaves

The Nederlandsche Cocaïnefabriek (Dutch pronunciation: [ˈneːdərlɑntsə koːkaːˈ(j)inəfaːˌbrik]; English: Dutch Cocaine Factory) or NCF was an Amsterdam-based company producing cocaine for medical purposes in the 20th century. It imported its raw materials mainly from the Dutch East Indies and sold its products across Europe, making good profits especially in the early years of World War I. The NCF produced morphine, heroin and ephedrine as well.

== History ==
In 1875, the first coca plants were transferred from Brazil to the colonial botanical garden "'s Lands Plantentuin te Buitenzorg" in Java. Shortly after, commercial production started in Java, Madura and Sumatra. Coca leaves were exported, mainly to Germany, through the Koloniale Bank in Amsterdam. This trader of agricultural produce moved between 34 and 81 tons of leaves annually from 1892 to 1900. Because of growing demand and a steady supply the Koloniale Bank decided to start production of cocaine in Amsterdam and it founded the Nederlandsche Cocaïnefabriek on 12 March 1900. Production started in a building designed by Herman Hendrik Baanders. The building was expanded in 1902, but in 1909 the factory moved to another location. Cocaine was sold as a medication for a variety of chest and lung ailments, but it was used as a recreational drug as well. The NCF soon became one of the major cocaine producers in Europe.

=== World War I ===
At first, the NCF profited from World War I by taking over markets established by German market leader Merck, which was hit by an export ban. A Dutch ban on selling medical supplies to warring parties was enforced, but the NCF got an exemption. The NCF had been selling some of its cocaine to Burroughs Wellcome & Co, which used it in its Forced March, a product that was advertised with: "Allays hunger and prolongs the power of endurance". Cocaine and opium were easily available to soldiers in for instance London's nightlife district of West End, until they were prohibited and brought under the Defence of the Realm Act in 1916. In 1917 unrestricted submarine warfare impacted the overseas imports, affecting the NCF just as well as others. According to Bosman, companies such as Merck produced an average of 7000 kg of cocaine per year in the period 1910-1914, while in 1918 they produced just 1700 kg. NCF in 1918 in the period 1910-1917 produced an average of 750 kg, and after the war from 1918 onwards 1500 kg.

=== Controlled substances ===
Conferences in Shanghai (1909) and The Hague (1912) laid foundations for control of narcotics. In the Dutch Opium Law of 1919 cocaine became a controlled substance. For the NCF this meant it had to get a permit to produce and sell - which it did. In the early 1920s the NCF produced 20% of the world's cocaine. At the International Opium Convention of 1925 a system of certificates was decided upon, to regulate exports of strictly medical and scientific cocaine only. In the Netherlands, further legal restrictions were imposed in 1928 to limit the selling of cocaine to medical uses. This also affected the NCF, but as not all surrounding countries ratified the decisions of the Convention (immediately), some free sales of cocaine continued. By 1930 however, cocaine had become a marginal product and the NCF was switching to other products.

=== Later years ===
In the early 1930s the NCF started to manufacture opiates like morphine and codeine to fill the gap left by the disappearing market for cocaine. The market situation for these products was not positive however, and margins were small. At the outbreak of World War II the NCF saw increased profits on its opiates, because of market shortages. After German troops entered the Netherlands on 10 May 1940, the NCF started producing ephedrine and amphetamine. A lack of raw materials (mainly opium) soon affected the company, and during the war opiates like morphine from poppy straw were mainly produced in Germany.

After the war production picked up again, with poppy straw imported from Turkey and Yugoslavia to produce morphine and other opiates. In 1962 the company's shares were acquired by Koninklijke Zwanenberg Organon (KZO, later Akzo). Soon after KZO was able to buy NCF's major Dutch competitor VPF as well. KZO reorganised and merged the production of both, shutting down the Amsterdam facility and transferring all alkaloid production activities to Apeldoorn. Since 1975, the NCF holding is included in Diosynth, a company held by AkzoNobel.

== Sources ==
- van der Hoogte, Arjo Roersch; Pieters, Toine (2013). "From Javanese Coca to Java Coca: An Exemplary Product of Dutch Colonial Agro-Industrialism, 1880-1920". Technology and Culture. 54 (1): 90–116. doi:10.1353/tech.2013.0045. S2CID 109164301. Project MUSE 500798.
- Bosman, H.H. (2012), The history of the Nederlandsche Cocaïne Fabriek and its successors as manufacturers of narcotic drugs, analysed from an international perspective, Foot & Playsted Pty. Ltd., Launceston, ISBN 978-0-9872751-2-7 (Volume 1) and ISBN 978-0-9872751-3-4 (Volume 2).
