= Lauriergracht =

Canal in Amsterdam

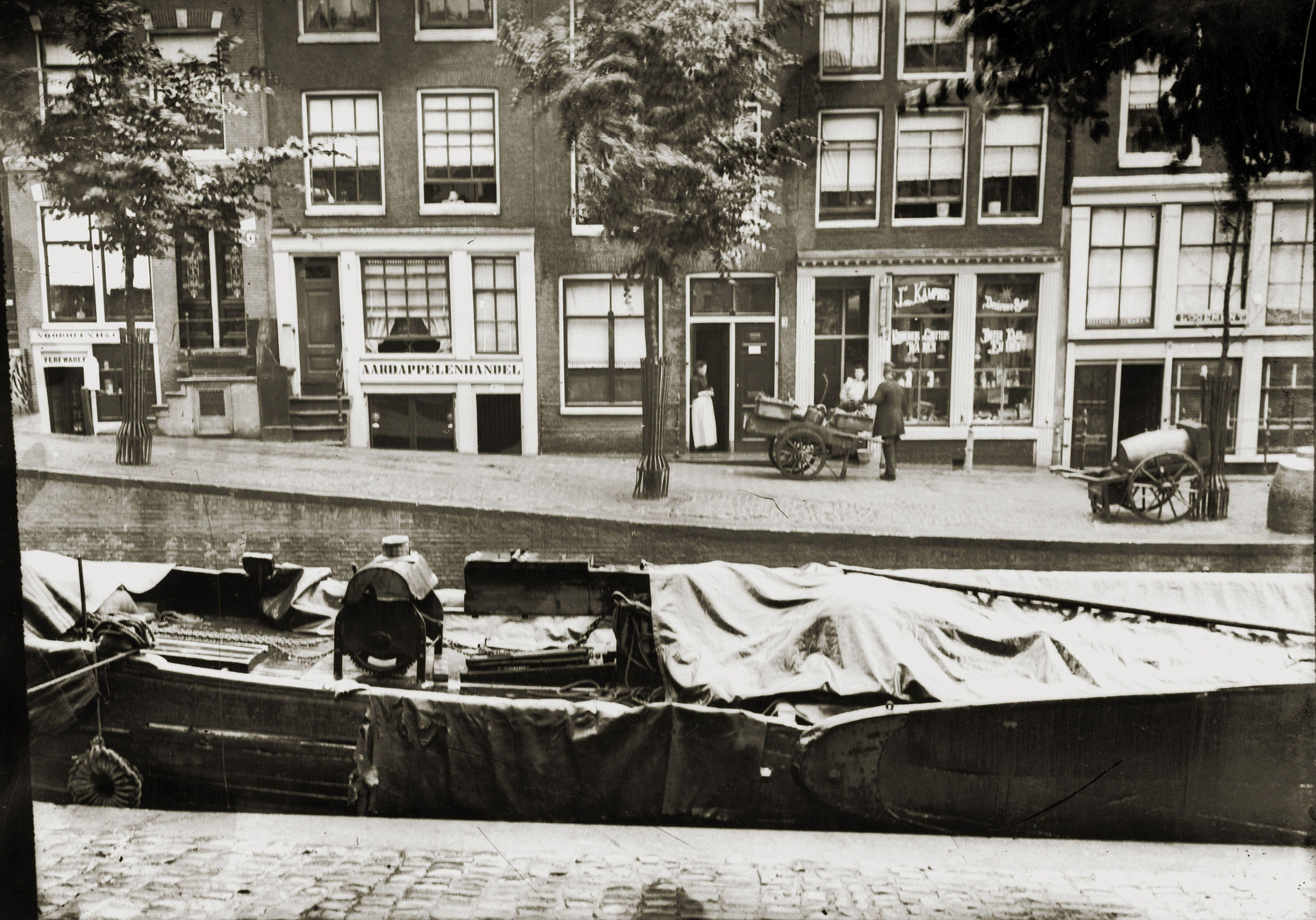
- Lauriergracht numbers 1 to 9, an 1895 photograph from the George Hendrik Breitner collection
- Interactive map of Lauriergracht
- Location: Amsterdam
- Country: Netherlands
- Coordinates: 52.3712°N 4.8800°E

The Lauriergracht (Dutch pronunciation: [lʌuˈriːrˌɣrɑxt]; literally "Laurel Canal") is one of the canals of Amsterdam, located in the Jordaan, west of the Grachtengordel.

== History and inhabitants ==
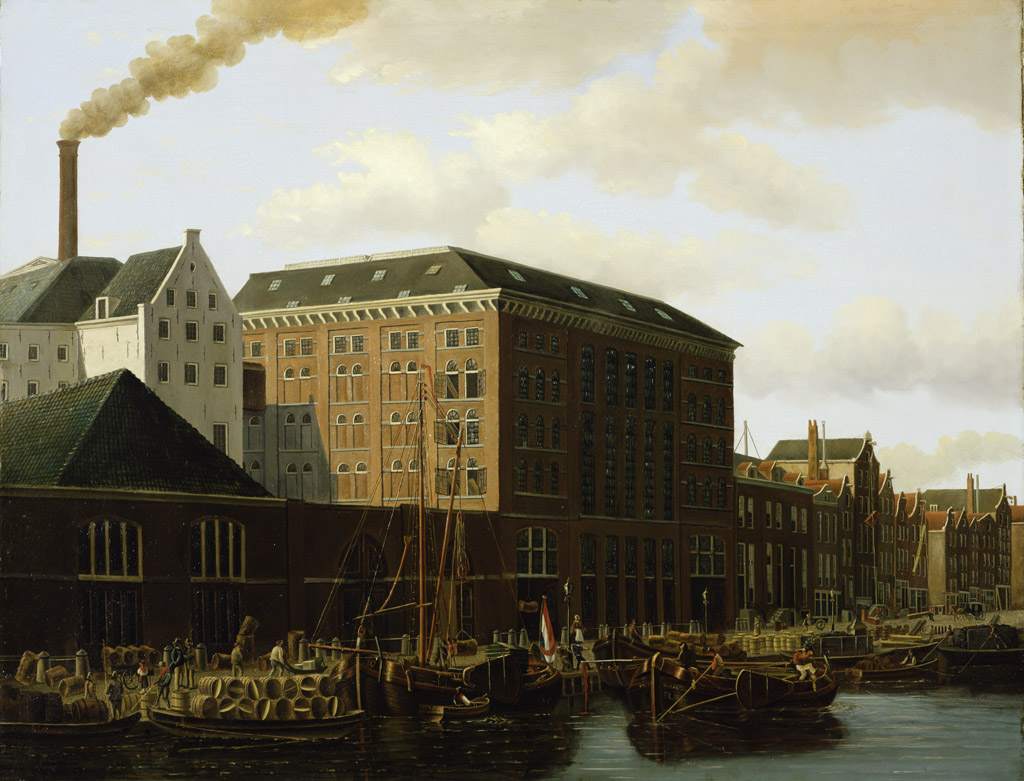
Johan Diderik Cornelis Veltens painting of the Beuker & Hulshoff sugar factory that used to be on the Lauriergracht, in the Amsterdam Museum

It was painted and photographed by George Hendrik Breitner who set up a studio on the canal, at number 8, in 1893 and stayed there until 1898. His De Lauriergracht bij de Tweede Laurierdwarsstraat (painted in 1917–1918) is in the Rijksmuseum. Prints of his paintings of Lauriergracht 1-15 are in the Stedelijk Museum.

At the end of the 17th century, the Lauriergracht had been the residence of several artists and their relatives.

Karel du Jardin's aunt Jaqueline lived there in 1661.

Govaert Flinck moved to the Lauriergracht in 1644, where his nephew Dirck already lived, and lived there until his death. He bought two adjacent houses, numbers 76 and 78. He initially worked at, and later took over from Rembrandt the management of, Hendrick Uylenburgh's workshop that was located on the canal.

One of the famous residents of the Lauriergracht is the fictional Batavus Droogstoppel, the unreliable narrator in Max Havelaar who is introduced in the first line of the book "Ik ben makelaar in koffie, en woon op de Lauriergracht nº 37". ("I am a coffee broker and I live at Number 37 Lauriergracht") which the character repeats over and over. In Dutch literature the address Lauriergracht 37 is as well known as James Joyce's 7 Eccles Street; in reality, it was an alley in the time of the author Dekker. From 1897 to 1984 it was the address of a Catholic institution for girls and women named "De Voorzienigheid" run by the Sisters of Providence; and then a block of flats, a gable stone by the main door of the flats proclaiming it to be the address of Last & Co., Makelaars in Koffie, Droogstoppel's fictional company.

The sugar factory on the painting by Johan Diedrik Cornelis Veltens burned down in 1880 (Lauriergracht 86; 7th january 1880).

The house on number 122 was built in 1889 by architect Herman Hendrik Baanders, the first of a series of successful and impressive designs by his hand.

Numbers 130 and 132 used to be a Christian Reformed Church; originally opened on 14 November 1900 and reopened on 21 December 1927 after an extension, the church was finally closed on 14 November 1985 and turned into apartments. The Evangelical Lutheran Church built an orphanage at numbers 112–118 in 1757.

Numbers 103 and 105 are another orphanage, a Roman Catholic one for boys that was built in the 17th century, run by the Brothers of Maastricht from 1845 to 1900, and by the aforementioned Sisters of Providence from then onwards.
