= Anouk Vogel =

Swiss-Dutch landscape architect (born 1977)

Anouk Vogel (born 1977, Geneva) is a Swiss Dutch landscape architect and designer based in the Netherlands. She trained in landscape architecture at Manchester Metropolitan University.

Her work includes gardens, public art installations, landscape projects, and architectural collaborations. Notable projects include the Mirror House in Almere (with architect Johan Selbing), the Vondelhappertjes (also known as Vondel Verses furniture) in Amsterdam’s Vondelpark, and the Bahrain Pavilion at Expo 2015 in Milan, along with a range of landscape and installation projects in Europe, United Arab Emirates and Japan.

She won the incentive prize for talented architects from the Netherlands with Johan Selbing the Prix de Rome in 2010. In 2012, she won the USM Mentor Prize by A&W by MVRDV.

== Work ==
=== Vondel Verses ===
In 2012, together with architect Johan Selbing, Vogel designed a series of cast-iron benches and drinking fountains for Vondelpark in Amsterdam. Known as the Vondelhappertjes, the fountains are engraved with Dutch sayings and literary fragments, linking everyday public infrastructure to cultural expression. The project formed part of a wider commission to renew the park’s furniture and facilities, and is frequently cited as an example of Vogel’s approach to combining functionality with narrative and symbolism in landscape design.

=== Mirror House ===
In 2013, Vogel collaborated with architect Johan Selbing on the Mirror House in Almere, the Netherlands. The compact dwelling was clad in reflective glass panels, designed to visually merge with its surroundings and blur the boundary between architecture and landscape. The project was the winning entry of a municipal competition for experimental housing and has been widely published in architectural media.

=== Bahrain Pavilion, Expo 2015 ===
Vogel contributed as part of the design team for the Bahrain Pavilion at Expo 2015 in Milan, Italy. The pavilion, designed by Dutch architect Anne Holtrop, featured a series of ten open-sided concrete “chapels” housing fruit trees, evoking the historic agricultural landscapes of Bahrain. The project was awarded the Silver Medal for Architecture and Landscape at the exposition. Vogel’s role focused on the integration of planting and landscape elements within the pavilion’s modular garden structures.

=== Gardens at Jameel Arts Centre ===
In 2018, Vogel designed a suite of seven courtyard gardens for the Jameel Arts Centre in Dubai, working with Serie Architects. Each garden represents a distinct desert biome (such as Arabian, Australian, Namibian, Chihuahuan, Socotran, Sonoran, and Madagascar’s Spiny Forest), and includes locally adapted or endangered plant species drawn from desert ecology. Vogel’s gardens at Jameel provide moments of quiet reflection between gallery spaces and help blur boundaries between built architecture and living landscape.

=== Westersingel Bridge ===
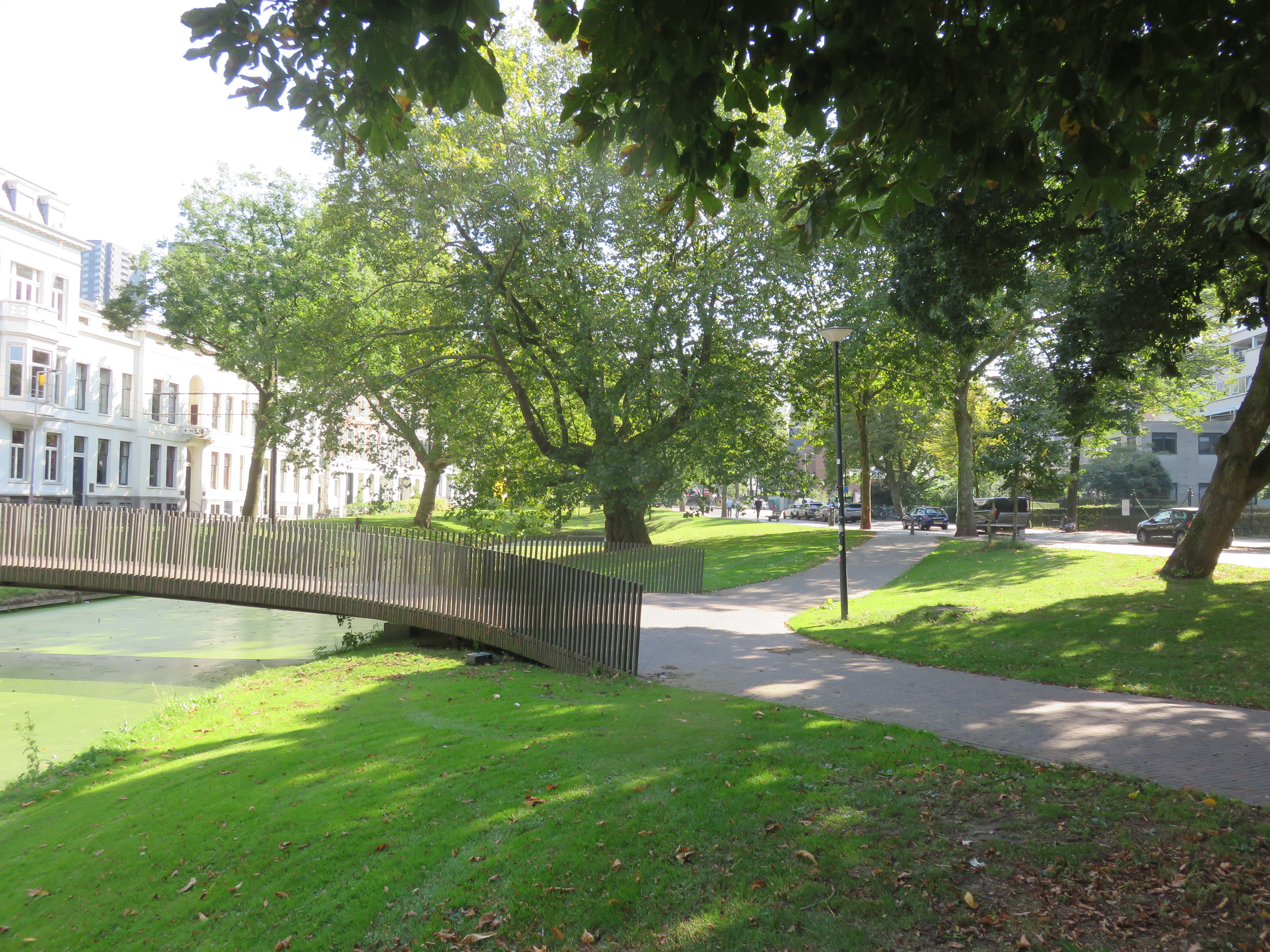
Westersingel Bridge, completed in April 2015

Westersingel Bridge in Rotterdam, located on the Westersingel near Kortenaerstraat. This bridge was designed by Studio Selva and Anouk Vogel Landscape Architecture.

== Publications ==
- Architecture Monogram #2 – Anouk Vogel – Soliloquy, published in 2019
