= Terrain:loenhart&mayr =

German architecture studio

terrain:loenhart&mayr is a German studio for architecture, landscape architecture and landscape urbanism, founded and based in Munich.

== History ==
The studio terrain:loenhart&mayr was established in 2003 by Klaus K. Loenhart and Christoph Mayr.

Loenhart (born 1965) studied architecture at the Munich University of Applied Sciences and Harvard Graduate School of Design in Cambridge (USA) after architectural practice for Herzog & de Meuron. 2006 he has been appointed full professor and head of the Institute for Architecture and Landscape at the Graz University of Technology

Christoph Mayr (born 1964) studied interior design Fachhochschule Rosenheim and architecture at the Munich University of Applied Sciences. Before founding terrain:loenhart&mayr he has been working for Uwe Kiessler.

== Selected Projects ==
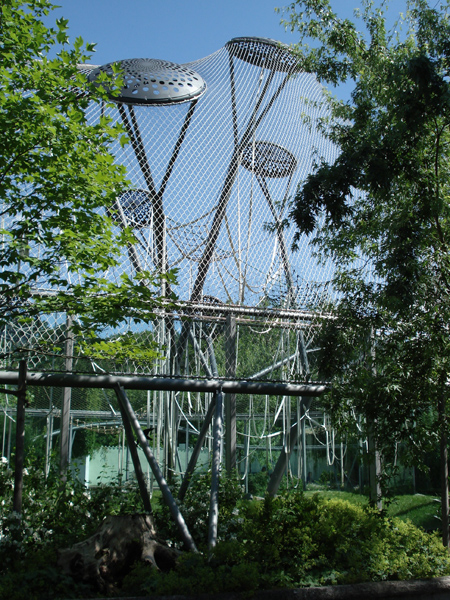
Hellabrunn Zoo Orang-Utan Large Outdoor Enclosure

- 2006-2008 Große Olympiaschanze in Garmisch-Partenkirchen Design and planning of the olympic ski jump, landing bridge and landscape architecture
- 2006-2007 Werkbundsiedlung Wiesenfeld, München in collaboration with Bernd Kniess Architekten Stadtplaner
- 2005-06 Zoo Hellabrunn: Orang-Utan Large Outdoor Enclosure, Munich in collaboration with Mayr + Ludescher
- 2005 TÜV SÜD, Testing Facility Prototype
- 2005 Exhibition Pavilion for BUGA National Garden Show 2005, Munich
- 2015 Austria's pavilion at Expo 2015

== Competitions ==
- 2008 Pavoreal Development at Graz World Heritage Site, Austria (3rd prize)
- 2006 Große Olympiaschanze Garmisch-Partenkirchen, Germany (1st prize)
- 2006-2007 Winning design scheme for Werkbundsiedlung Wiesenfeld Munich, Germany (1st prize)

== Awards ==
- 2009 Nomination for Mies van der Rohe Award for European Architecture
- 2008 Balthasar Neumann Preis (shortlist)
- 2008 Ingenieurbau-Preis Ernst und Sohn, (commendation)
- 2005 Renault Traffic Design Award for TUEV SUED
