= Blauwe Theehuis =

Coordinates: 52°21′32″N 4°52′21″E

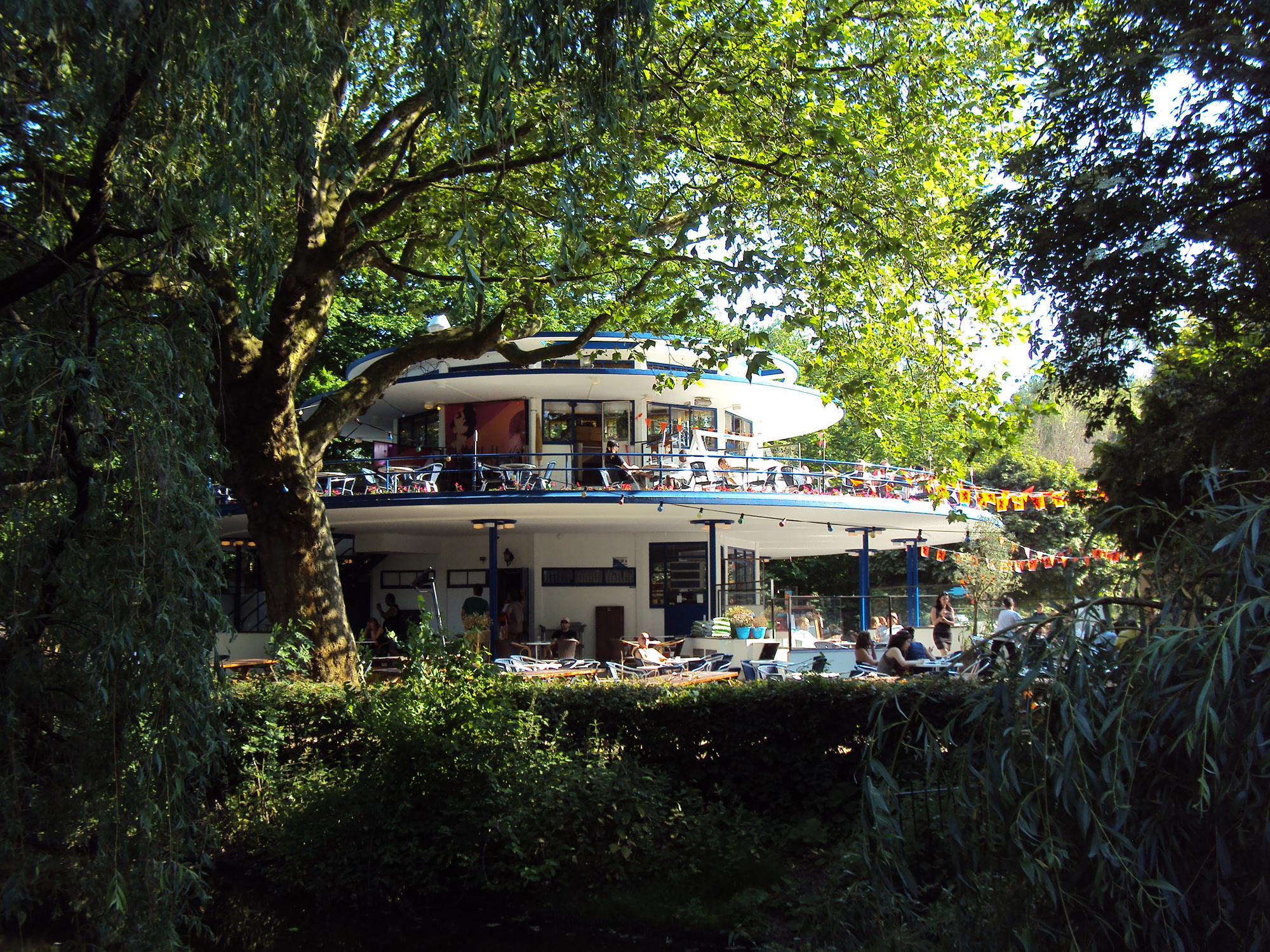
The Blauwe Theehuis

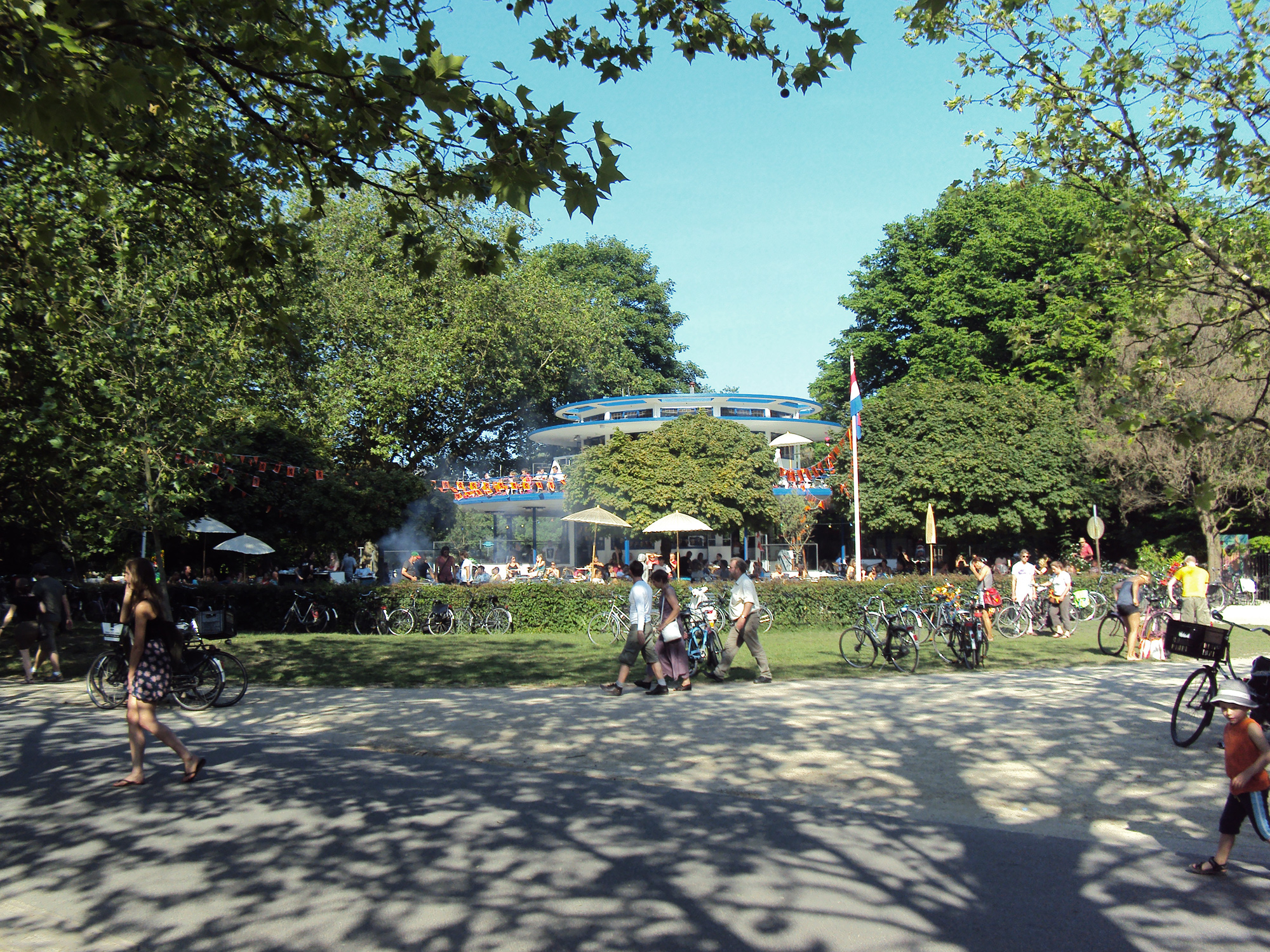
The Blauwe Theehuis

The Blauwe Theehuis ("Blue Tea House") is a 1930s Modernist pavilion in the Vondelpark in Amsterdam, the capital city of the Netherlands. It is a ring-shaped building, somewhat reminiscent of a flying saucer. Originally a tea house, it is in use as a café and restaurant, surrounded by outside seating. The Blauwe Theehuis is also used for theatre performances, festivals, weddings, and other events. The building has rijksmonument (national monument) status.

The building was constructed out of concrete, steel and glass. It consists of two circular floors stacked on top of each other, with a circular roof as the third "saucer". The octagonally shaped ground floor is topped by a 12-sided top floor which originally served as residence of the proprietor. A staircase on the outside of the building provides access to the top floor. The roof edges and balustrades and the 12 pillars supporting the top floor are painted blue.

== History ==
The Blauwe Theehuis was built in 1937, after the previous tea house on that spot was set on fire and burned down in the summer of 1936. The brothers H.A.J. Baanders and Jan Baanders designed the pavilion in the Modernist Nieuwe Bouwen or Nieuwe Zakelijkheid style of architecture, a Dutch take on Bauhaus.

On 3 May 1997, the then-owner of the Blauwe Theehuis, 55-year-old Piet Bosters, was found murdered in his residence on the top floor of the building. Apparently he had been the victim of a robbery, as 30,000 guilders had disappeared from the residence. However, there were no signs of forced entry, indicating that the perpetrator may have been an acquaintance of Bosters', or had somehow obtained a copy of the keys to the building. The case was never solved.

After the new owners purchased the building in 1998, the top floor was added to the restaurant.

In 2019 the building was taken over by Brouwerij 't IJ.

== See also ==
- List of tea houses
