= Vondelpark =

Park in Amsterdam, Netherlands

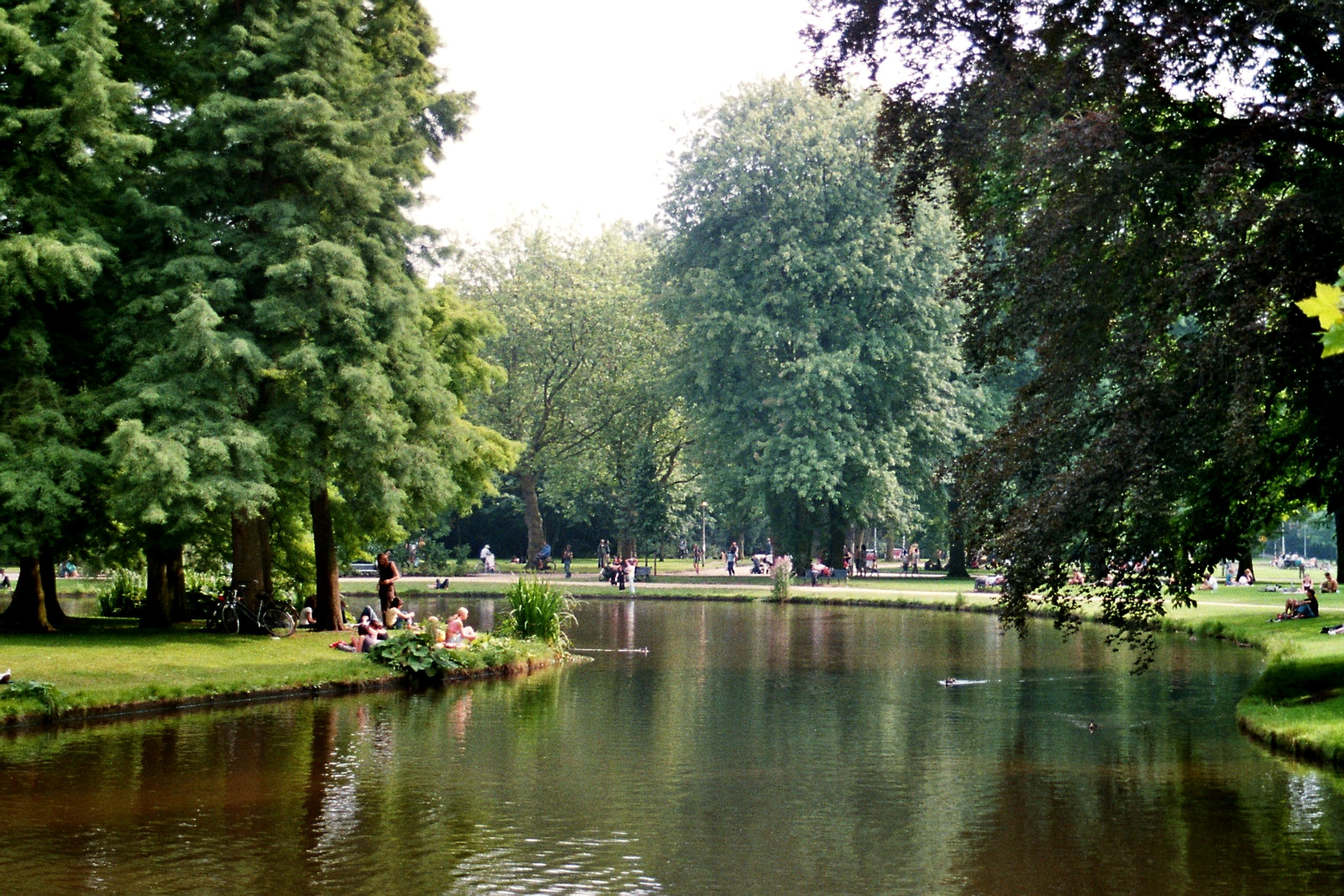
- A pond in the Vondelpark

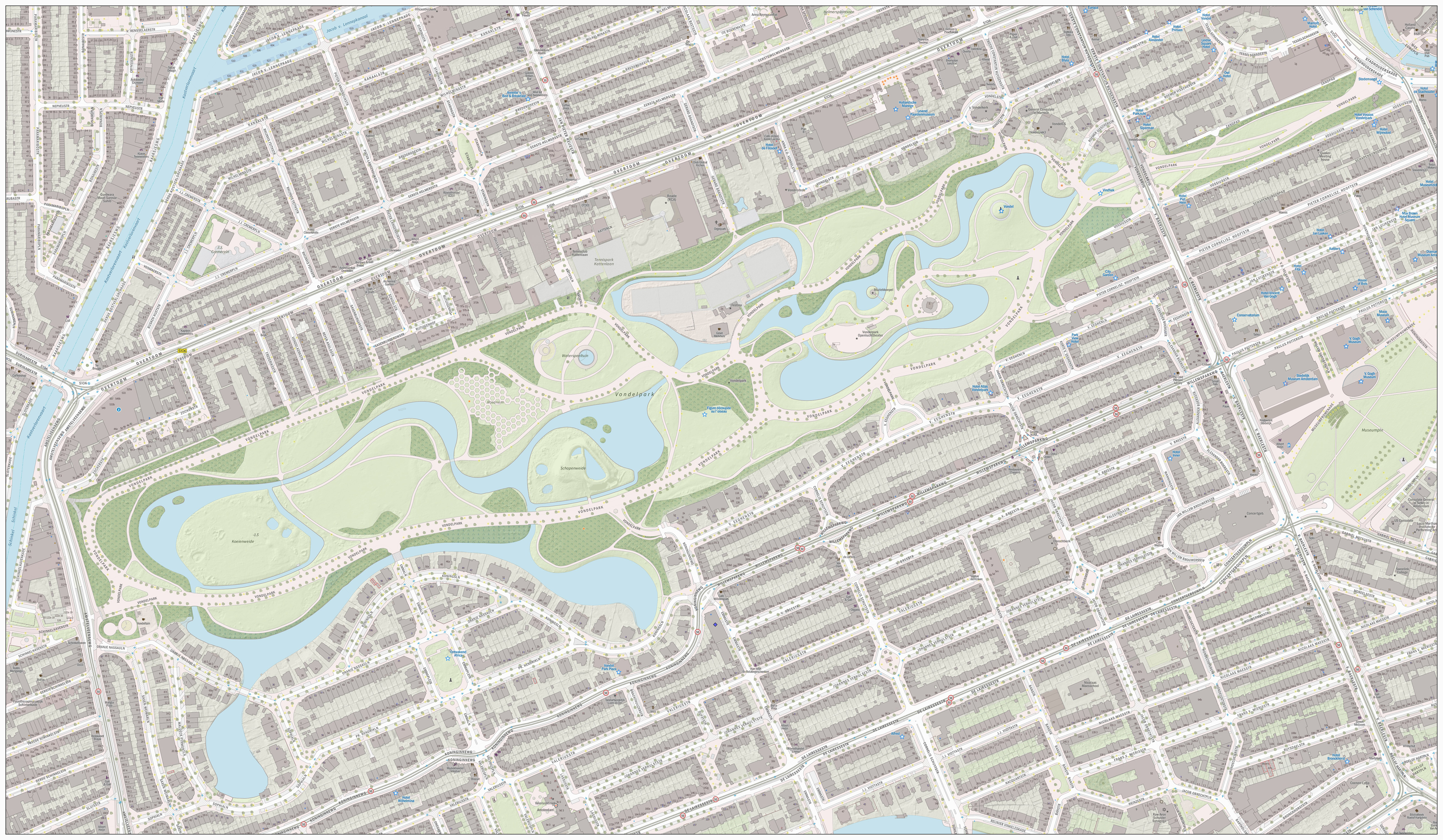
- Map of the Vondelpark
- Type: Urban park
- Location: Amsterdam, Netherlands
- Coordinates: 52.358°N 4.868°E
- Area: 47 ha (120 acres)
- Created: 15 July 1865
- Operator: Amsterdam-Zuid
- Visitors: 10 million
- Status: Open all year

The Vondelpark (Dutch pronunciation: [ˈvɔndəlˌpɑr(ə)k]) is a public urban park of 47 hectares (120 acres) in Amsterdam, Netherlands. It is part of the borough of Amsterdam-Zuid and situated west from the Leidseplein and the Museumplein. The park was opened in 1865 and originally named Nieuwe Park (English: New Park), but later renamed Vondelpark, after the 17th-century playwright and poet Joost van den Vondel. The park has around 10 million visitors annually. Within the park is an open-air theatre, a playground and several food service facilities.

== History ==
=== 19th century ===
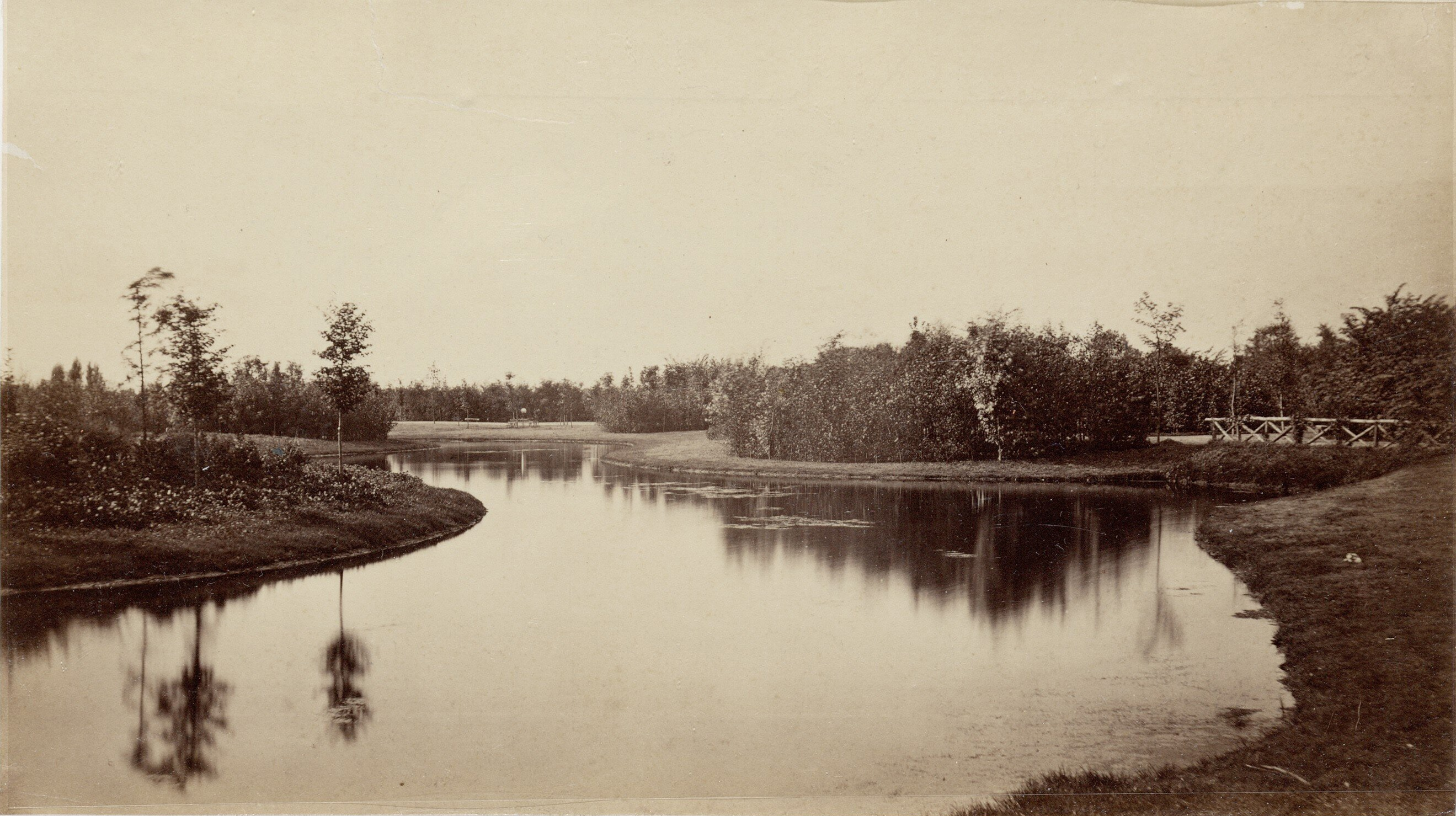
In 1868 the vegetation in the new park had yet to flourish.

The statue of Joost van den Vondel in the late 19th century

In 1864 a group of citizens led by Christiaan Pieter van Eeghen established the Vereeniging tot Aanleg van een Rij- en Wandelpark (English: Association for the Construction of a Park for Riding and Walking). They bought several hectares of grass-land and marshes at the rim of the city of Amsterdam, in order to create the new park. They assigned its design to the architect Jan David Zocher, and in 1865 "Het Nieuwe Park" (English: "The New Park") was opened free for members of the association and with other citizens paying an entrance fee.

Two years after the park opened, in 1867, a statue of writer and playwright Joost van den Vondel by sculptor Louis Royer was placed in the park on a stand designed by architect Pierre Cuypers. As a result, people started to call the park "Vondelspark" (English: "Vondel's Park").

In 1873, a bandstand was built. In the same year, brewer Gerard Adriaan Heineken was denied permission to open a bar in the park, so he built the Bierhuis Vondel (English: "Beer House Vondel") in a nearby street in what is now Vondelstraat 41.

The last part of the park was designed by Louis Paul Zocher, Jan David Zocher's son, and was realized from 1876 to 1877. The park then arrived at its current size of 47 hectares. The English garden style design of the Zochers has been roughly maintained, although in the late 19th century the elongated park had a stream of water running through it with many paths and bushes alongside it.

In 1878, the Pavillon (English: "Pavilion") was built to replace a wooden chalet built by Louis Paul Zocher. The Pavillon is currently known as the Vondelparkpaviljoen (English: "Vondelpark Pavilion"). The park's name officially became "Vondelpark" in 1880.

Already in the 1880s and 1890s cycling in the park was causing problems. The park management tried to resolve this with restrictive measures against cyclists, such as special bike paths, limited opening hours, and fines for cyclists that were going faster than a horse's trot. It was only after mediation of the Algemene Nederlandsche Wielrijders-Bond (English: "General Dutch Cyclists Union"), that helped fund the park, that a park guard was installed and cyclists were again permitted to cycle normally.

=== 20th century ===
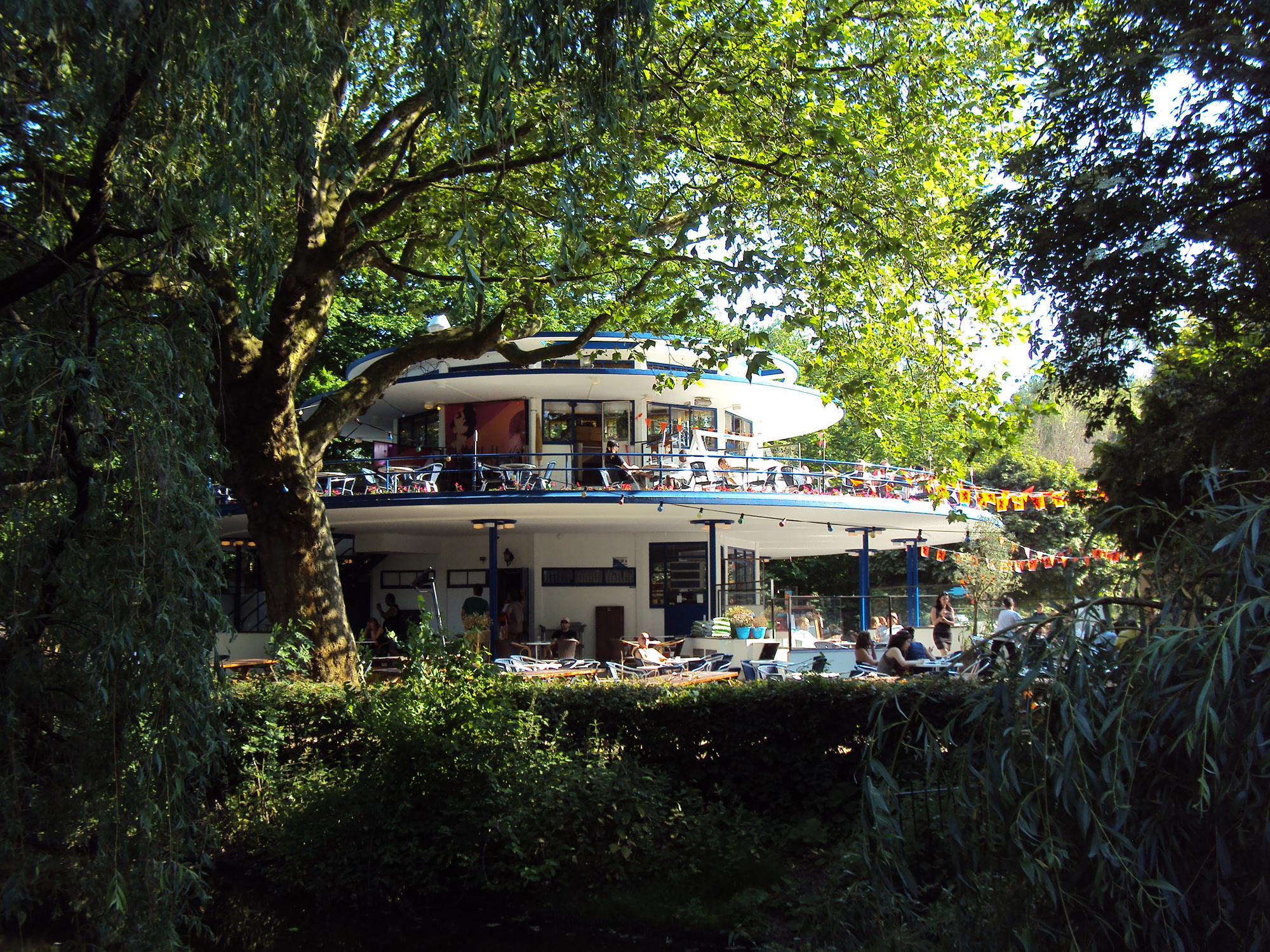
The Blauwe Theehuis in 2010

In 1936, a rose garden was created in the center of the park.

One year later in 1937, the Blauwe Theehuis (English: "Blue Tearoom") was opened. This tearoom is a round modernist building, designed by the architectural office Baanders.

In the following years the overall maintenance of the park became too expensive for the Vereniging tot aanleg van een rij- en wandelpark (English: "Association for the creation of a park for riding and strolling"), due to an intensified use, and in 1953 the association donated the park to the city of Amsterdam. The landscape architect Egbert Mos renovated the Vondelpark for the city in the 1950s. The purpose was improve the park for both usage and maintenance. Small bushes were grouped into larger bushes, superfluous paths were removed, and the rose garden was renovated. Also the stream of water in the "trunk" near the northern entrance of the park was removed.

In the 1960s children's playgrounds were created. During the flower power era in the 1960s/1970s the Vondelpark became a symbol of a place where "everything is possible and (almost) everything is allowed". In the 1980s an open-air theatre was built.

The Vondelpark received the status of rijksmonument (English: "state monument") in 1996.

=== 21st century ===
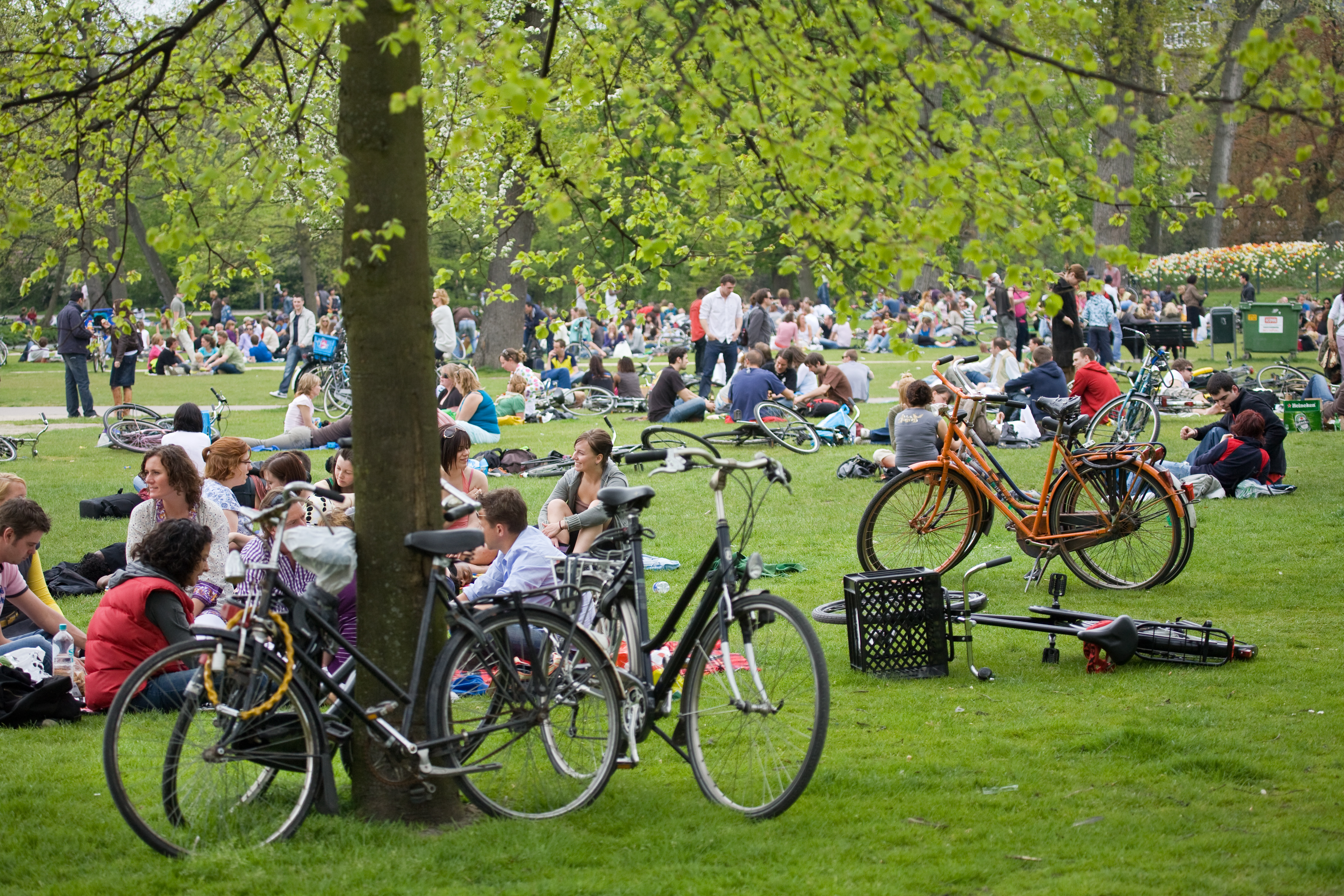
People in the park on a Sunday in September 2008

In the 1990s the number of visitors grew to approximately 10 million visitors annually. The grassy areas are used as sports field and the paths as bike paths. Consequently, the city renovated the park from 1999 to 2010. The purpose was to beautify the park and lessen the need for maintenance. The renovation took more than ten years in order to increase convenience for visitors and for the security of resident animals.

Starting in September 2008, adults were legally allowed to have sex in the park, as long as they "[took] their garbage with them afterwards and never [had] intercourse near the playground. Sexual activities were to be limited to the evening hours and night.", in the words of current Amsterdam Alderman Paul Van Grieken.

== Facilities ==
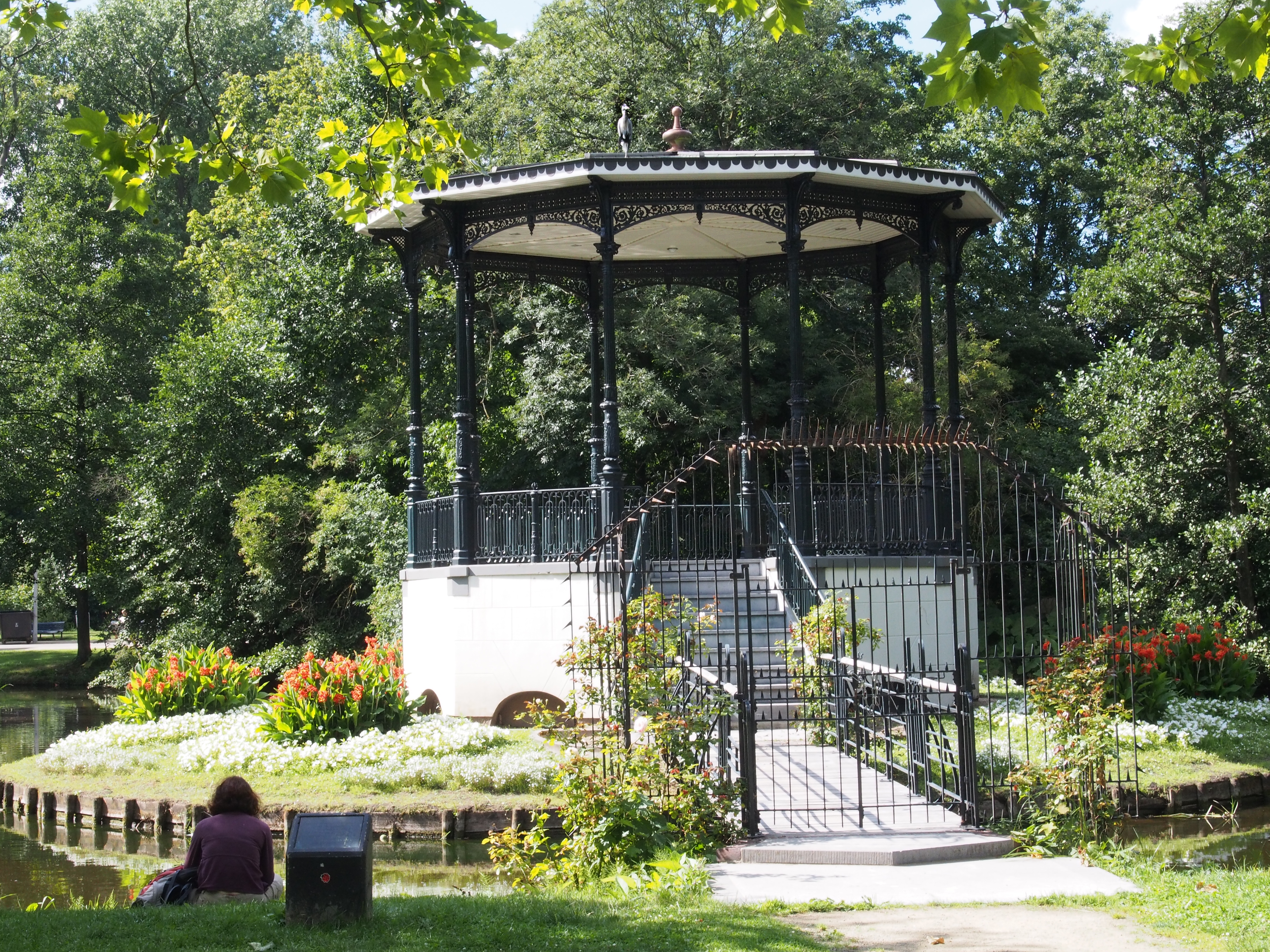
Muziektent

=== Open-air theatre ===
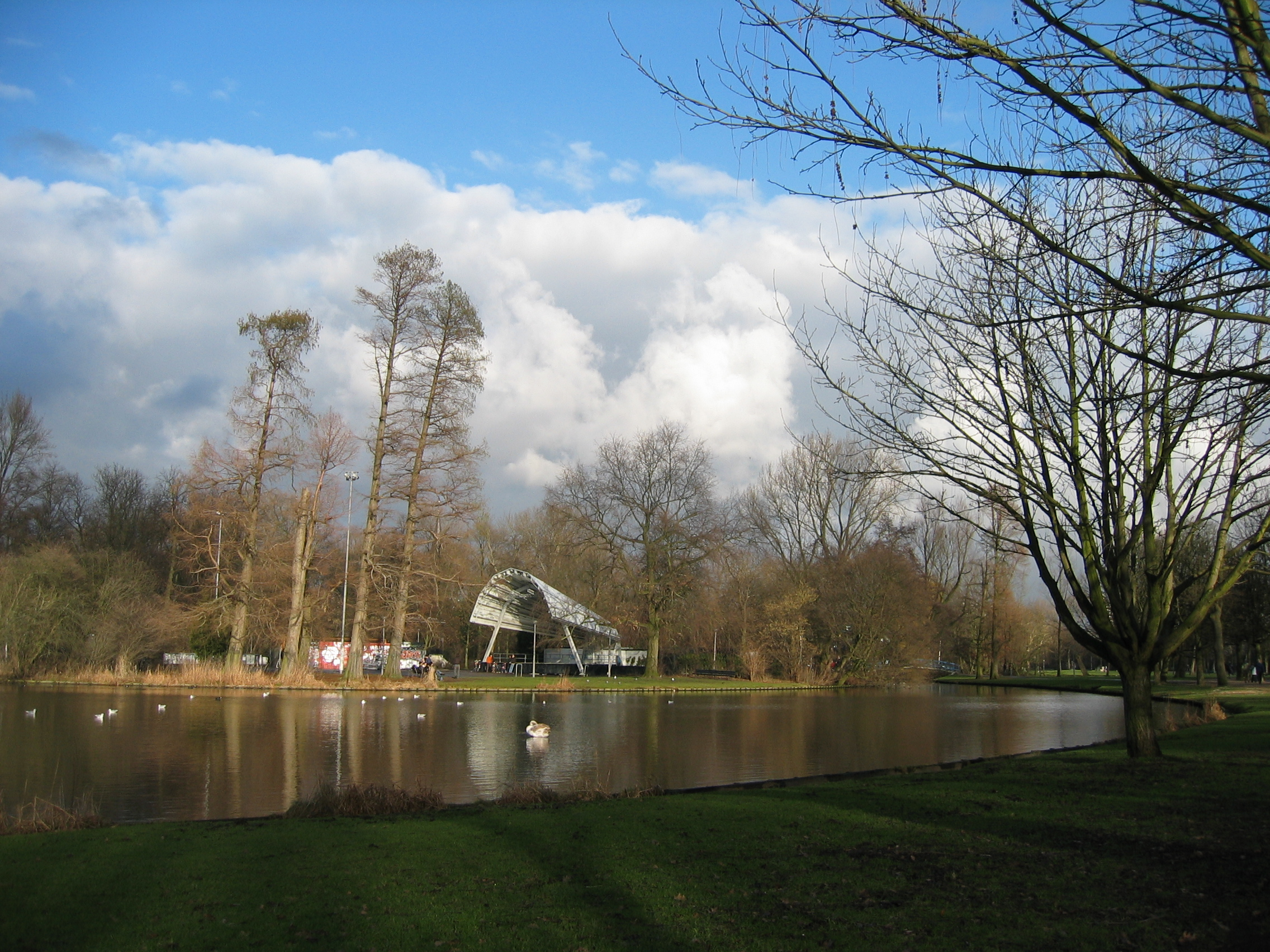
The open-air theatre in the Vondelpark

The Vondelpark Openluchttheater is an open-air theatre with shows from June until August. There are performances of classical music, pop music, world music, dance, musical theatre, and cabaret. The theatre receives a subsidy from the city government. And although all performances have free entrance, visitors are asked for a donation of one euro.

=== Furniture ===
In 2009, an international design competition was held to update Vondelpark’s public furniture. The winning design, by landscape architect Anouk Vogel with architect Johan Selbing, introduced a new suite of cast-iron furnishings including benches, lighting and kiosks. Installed from 2012, the benches feature motifs of local flora and fauna. The park benches can be “adopted” by individuals or companies, who may dedicate them with personalized plaques for a fixed period.

=== Food service ===
In the park are several food service (horeca) facilities (listed in alphabetical order):

- 't Blauwe Theehuis, a bar and restaurant
- Groot Melkhuis, a bar and restaurant
- Vondeling, the bar and restaurant of the open-air theatre
- Vondeltuin, a bar and restaurant

== Statues ==
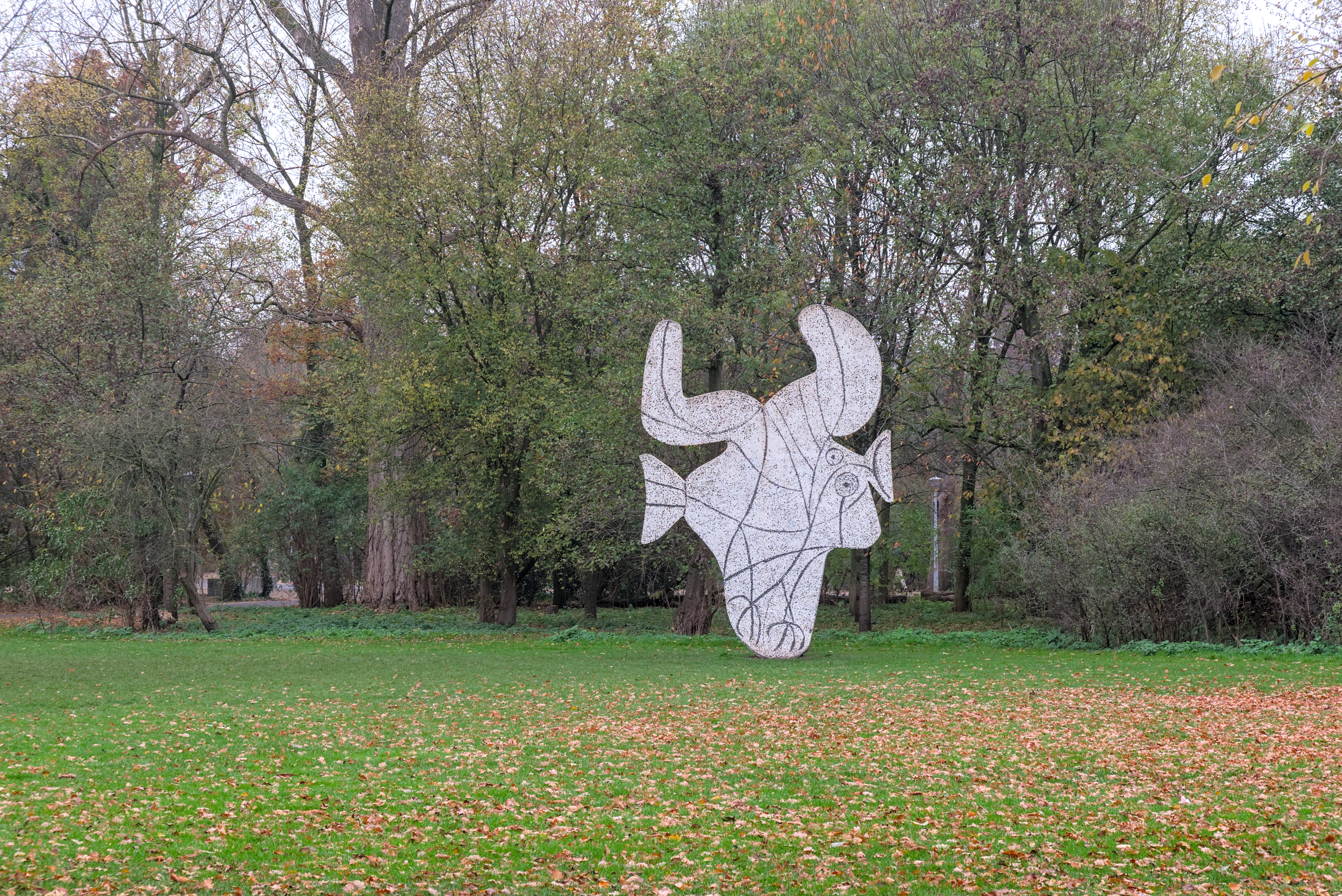
The Fish (1965), a sculpture by Pablo Picasso

There are some statues in the park:

- Joost van den Vondel (1867) by Louis Royer
- The Fish (1965) by Pablo Picasso
- Mama Baranka (1985) by Nelson Carrilho

== Events ==
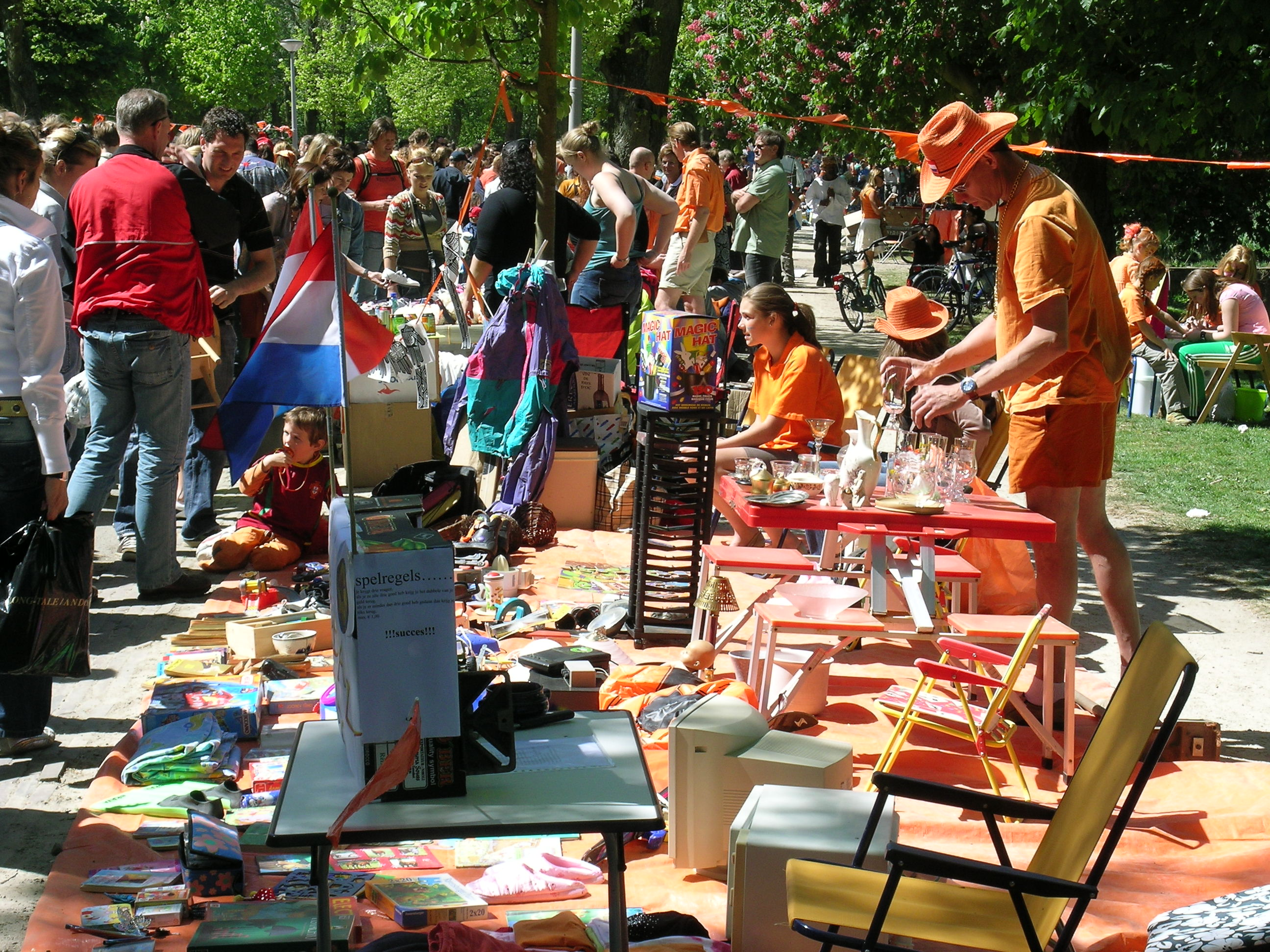
Freemarket in the Vondelpark during Queen's Day

Video of Vondelpark

Every Friday there is the Fridaynightskate that starts in front of the Filmmuseum.

Yearly events include the golf tournament Vondelpark Open and the running contest Vondelparkloop.

The King's Day celebrations on 27 April in the Vondelpark focus specifically on children. There is a "freemarket" (Dutch: vrijmarkt) and there are games and other activities for children.

From June until August there are music and dance performances in the open-air theatre.

Since 2011 on the evening of All Soul's Day people gather and float many small "remembrance" boats with a lighted candle in the big pond to remember those who have died in the last year(s).

From 2015 until 2020 and in 2024, the live broadcast finale of the Dutch television series Wie is de Mol? (Who is the Mole?), where the Mole (and their activity during the season) is revealed, took place at VondelCS (a cultural event centre in the park).

== Popular culture ==
The park is referenced in Acda en De Munnik's song "Vondelpark vannacht" from the album Acda en De Munnik (1997), in Omar Rodríguez-López's song "Vondelpark bij nacht" from the album Omar Rodriguez (2005) and in John Craigie's song "Vondelpark" from the album Working On My Farewell (2015). 1990s' 2009 album 'Kicks' opens with a track entitled "Vondelpark", which is a tour diary from one of the band's trips to the Netherlands. The English dream pop band Vondelpark took their name from the park.

English Indie musician Jess Kemp has a single titled 'Vondelpark'.

Since the 1970s the park has a growing population of feral rose-ringed parakeets.
