= Wouters =

Wouters is a Dutch patronymic surname, meaning son of Wouter, and corresponding to Walters or Watts in English. In 2007/2008 there were about 8700 people in the Netherlands and 15700 people in Belgium with that name. People with this name include:

- Ad Wouters (born 1944), Dutch sculptor active in Belgium
- Aloïs Wouters (born 1962), Belgian racing cyclist
- Cas Wouters (1943–2025), Dutch sociologist
- Chase Wouters (born 2000), Canadian ice hockey player
- Dries Wouters (born 1997), Belgian football defender
- Enzo Wouters (born 1996), Belgian racing cyclist
- Frans Wouters (1612–1659), Flemish painter
- G. Henry Wouters (1802–1872), Flemish church historian
- Hendrina Wouters (1718–1746), Dutch murderer
- Hugo Wouters (1931–1975), Flemish poet with the pseudonym "Hugues C. Pernath"
- Jan Wouters (born 1960), Dutch football midfielder
- Jan Wouters (legal scholar) (born 1964), Belgian legal scholar
- Jean de Wouters (1905–1973), Belgian inventor and aerodynamics engineer
- Jean Claude Wouters (born 1956), Belgian dancer, film maker and painter
- Josee Wouters (fl. 1947), Belgian table tennis player
- Joseph Wouters (born 1942), Belgian racing cyclist
- Jürgen Wouters (born 1981), Dutch badminton player
- Leon Wouters (1930–2015), Belgian football defender and coach
- Liliane Wouters (1930–2016), Belgian poet, playwright, anthologist and essayist
- Lode Wouters (1929–2014), Belgian racing cyclist
- Michaelina Wouters (ca. 1620–after 1682), Flemish painter
- Rik Wouters (1882–1916), Belgian painter and sculptor
- Rolf Wouters (born 1963), Dutch television show host
- Sieben Wouters (born 1996), Dutch racing cyclist
- Stefan Wouters (born 1972), Belgian visual artist and curator
- Thierry Wouters (born 1979), Belgian swimmer
- Veerle Wouters (born 1974), Belgian politician
- Wayne Wouters (born 1951), Canadian Clerk of the Privy Council

== See also ==
- Wauters, homonymic surname
- Wouters v Algemene Raad van de Nederlandse Orde van Advocaten, European Court of Justice decision concerning competition law
