= Lindengracht =

Canal in Amsterdam

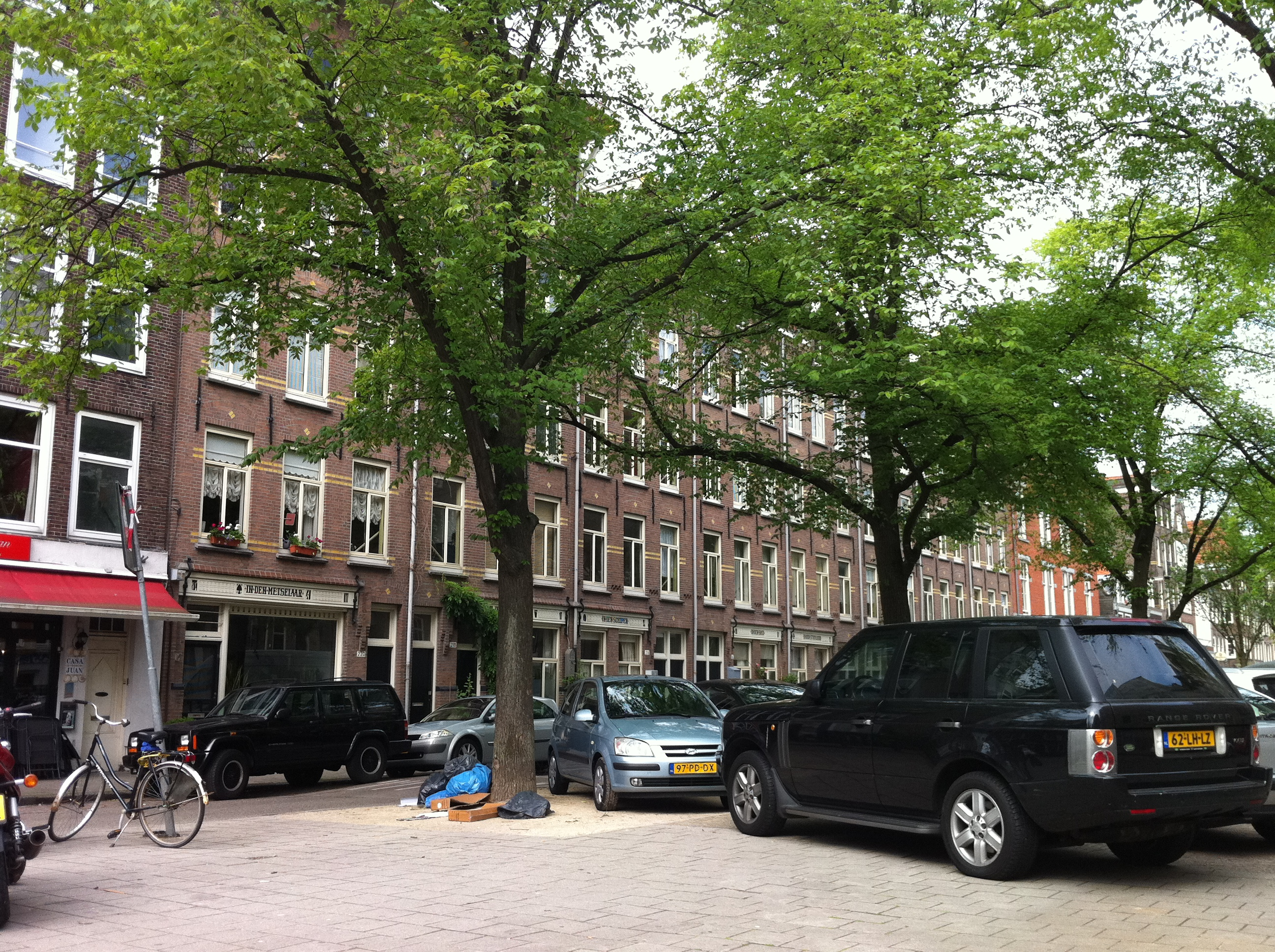
- Building by the Jordaan Construction Company, with Louise Went as home supervisor

- Length: .5 kilometres (0.31 mi)
- Location: Amsterdam
- Postal code: 1015
- Coordinates: 52.380214°N 4.884549°E
- East end: Brouwersgracht
- To: Lijnbaansgracht

The Lindengracht is a street and former canal in Amsterdam. It is in the Jordaan neighborhood of the Centrum district just west of the canal belt. The canal was back-filled in 1895. It connected the Brouwersgracht with the Lijnbaansgracht. The Eerste Lindendwarsstraat and Tweede Lindendwarsstraat are side streets. Lindenstraat runs parallel to the Lindengracht.

== History ==
The Lindengracht was dug in the first half of the 17th century during the major urban expansion called the Third Expansion of Amsterdam.

Founded in the 14th century and almost completely destroyed by fire in 1572, the Carthusian monastery ' Sint-Andries- ter-Zaliger-Haven' was initially outside the city walls. After the city expansion of 1612, the site came to lie within the city: between Lindengracht, Tweede Lindendwarsstraat, Lijnbaansgracht and Karthuizersstraat. The only thing that visibly recalls the monastery - mentioned by Joost van den Vondel in his play Gijsbrecht van Aemstel - is the 17th-century 'Karthuizerhofje for widows' (also known as Het Huiszittenweduwenhof ).

The Lindengracht and the Palmgracht were back-filled in 1895. There were eleven canals in the Jordaan: from north to south: Palmgracht, Goudsbloemgracht, Lindengracht, Anjeliersgracht, Egelantiersgracht, Bloemgracht, Rozengracht, Lauriergracht, Elandsgracht, Looiersgracht and Passeerdersgracht. The Goudsbloemgracht was backfilled after 1857, the Anjeliersgracht in 1861, the Elandsgracht in 1891 and the Rozengracht in 1889. The reasons for back-filling were the poor water quality and the need to create space for increasing traffic. The Rozengracht became an important tram connection between the center and the neighborhoods west of the Singelgracht. Various plans to back-fill other canals met with resistance from residents, shopkeepers and market traders.

On 25 and 26 July 1886 the police tried to prevent playing of the forbidden game of palingtrekken (eel pulling) on Zaterdagse Brug over the Lindengracht. This led to riots known as the Palingoproer (Eel riot) in which 25 people were killed.

Thanks to the efforts of Louise Went, home supervisor and later director of Bouwonderneming Jordaan NV, and her future husband, the architect Jan Ernst van der Pek, a block of new homes was built in 1896 on Lindengracht near Goudsbloemstraat and Goudsbloemdwarsstraten. Initiatives such as these had a major impact on the development of social housing. The reliefs on the facades of Lindengracht (206–220) depict craftsmen's professions.

The Albert Cuypstraat, Dapperstraat, Ten Katestraat and Lindengracht were designated as service streets in 1910. There is a Saturday market on Lindengracht.

On 5 July 1934, the first fatal victim of the Jordaanoproer (Jordaan riot) fell on Lindengracht. The man was hit by a bullet in the head.

The bronze statue that Hans Bayens made in 1979 in honor of writer and schoolmaster Theo Thijssen is on the Lindengracht near the Brouwersgracht. The Jan Ligtharthuis, named after the educational innovator Jan Ligthart, is at Lindengracht 83-85.

The OKC (Municipal Parent and Child Center) has been located at Lindengracht 204 since 2009. The Stadsbank van Lening was housed in this building from 1902 until 2008 .

There are 21 rijksmonumenten (national monuments) on the Lindengracht.

== Courtyards ==
- The rijksmonumen Lindenhofje, Lindengracht 94-112 from 1616 is one of the oldest courtyards in Amsterdam.
- The rijksmonument Suykerhofje from 1667, Lindengracht 149-163. (The Nieuwe Suykerhofje from 1755 is located at Prinsengracht 385-393.)

== Alleys ==
In many places in the Jordaan there were so-called corridors between the houses. These narrow alleys gave access to the (often illegally) built-in backyards behind the row of houses, where the less fortunate lived in often dilapidated shelters. The north side of the Lindengracht alone included:

- Schuitenvoerdersgang (between nrs. 12 and 24)
- Medemblikkersgang (between 28 and 38)
- Valwatergang (between 64 and 66)
- Scheepjesgang (between 80 and 86)
- Oudhuizersgang (between 168 and 182)
- Kuipersgang (between 162 and 168)
- Roo (de) hanengang (between 194 and 204)
- Oude Slijpersgang (between 206 and 214)
- Goudsbloemgang (between 216 and 224)
- Sint Jacobsgang (between 224 and 232)
- Suikerbakkersgang (between 236 and 246)
- Wittekruislaan (between 280 and 282)
- Aalsmeerdergang (between 286 and 290)
- Verwersgang (between 292 and 302)
- Ruitersgang (between 308 and 318)
- Houte (n) kamsgang (between 320 and 326)
- Gijzelaarsgang (between 326 and 332)

These alleys have usually been given a different use after restoration or new construction of adjacent buildings.

== Schools ==
- The former Christian GLO Eduard Gerdesschool is at number 146.
- The former Christian Vak- en Huishoudschool Prinses Irene is located at Lindengracht 284-302.
- The Christian VO School Jan Ligtharthuis is located at numbers 83-85.
- The Amsterdamse Toneelschool & Kleinkunstacademie was located in the former public school 111 on Lindengracht 93.
- An entrance to the former Lagere School nr. 113 located on Goudsbloemstraat is at Lindengracht 200.

== Famous residents ==
- Jan de Bray ( 1627–97), painter, lived his last years on the Lindengracht (from 1692)
- Jan Micker (1598–1664), a Dutch Golden Age landscape painter, was living on the Lindengracht when he died
- Hercules Seghers (c. 1589–1638), painter and printmaker, had a large house on the Lindengracht from 1620 to1631
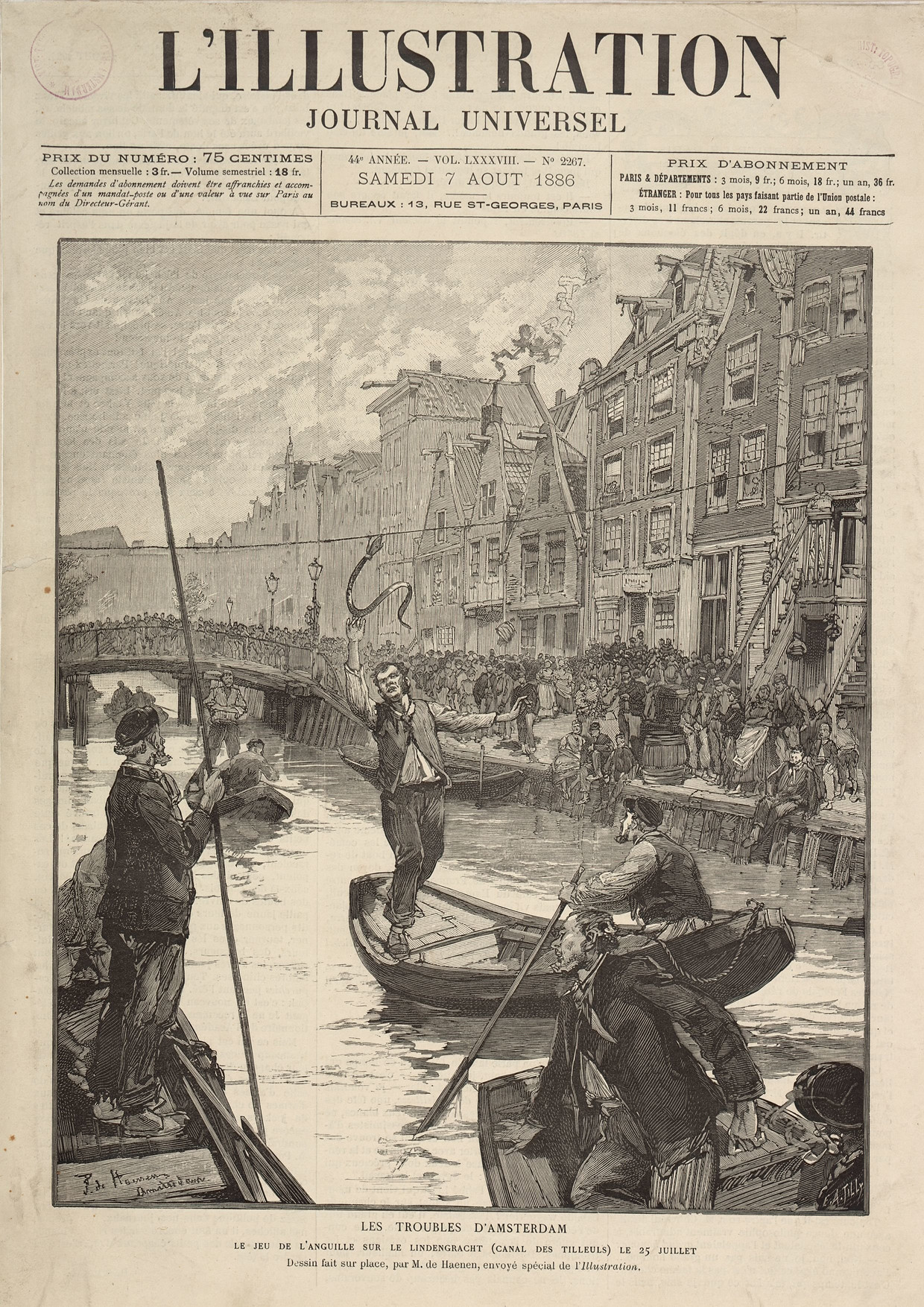
Eel pulling

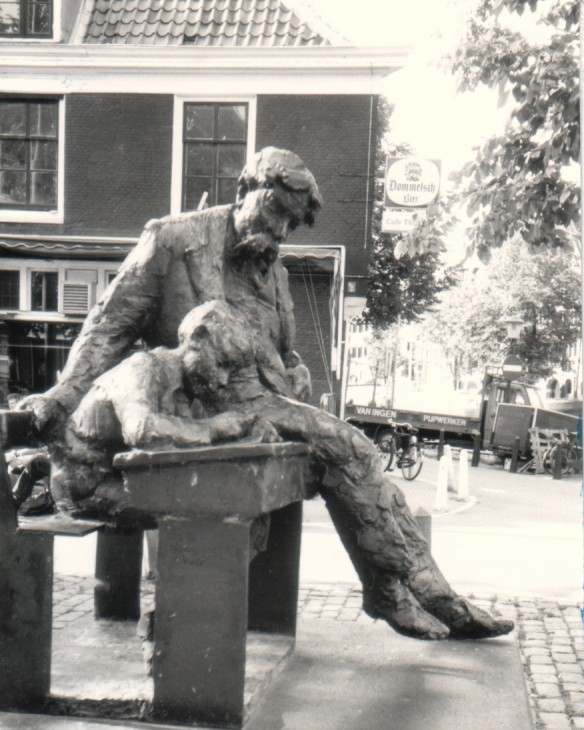
Image of Theo Thijssen by Hans Bayens

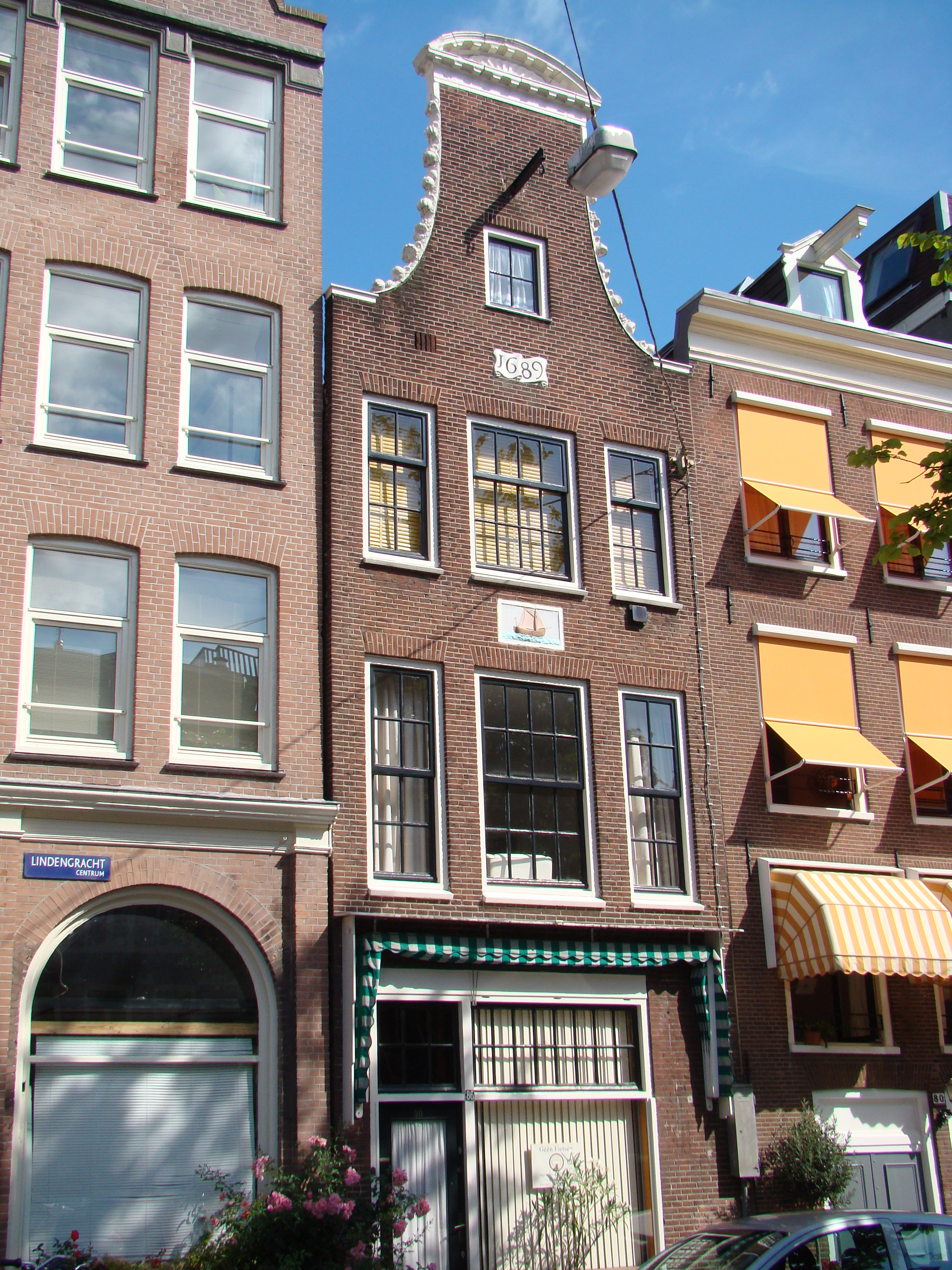
Lindengracht 86

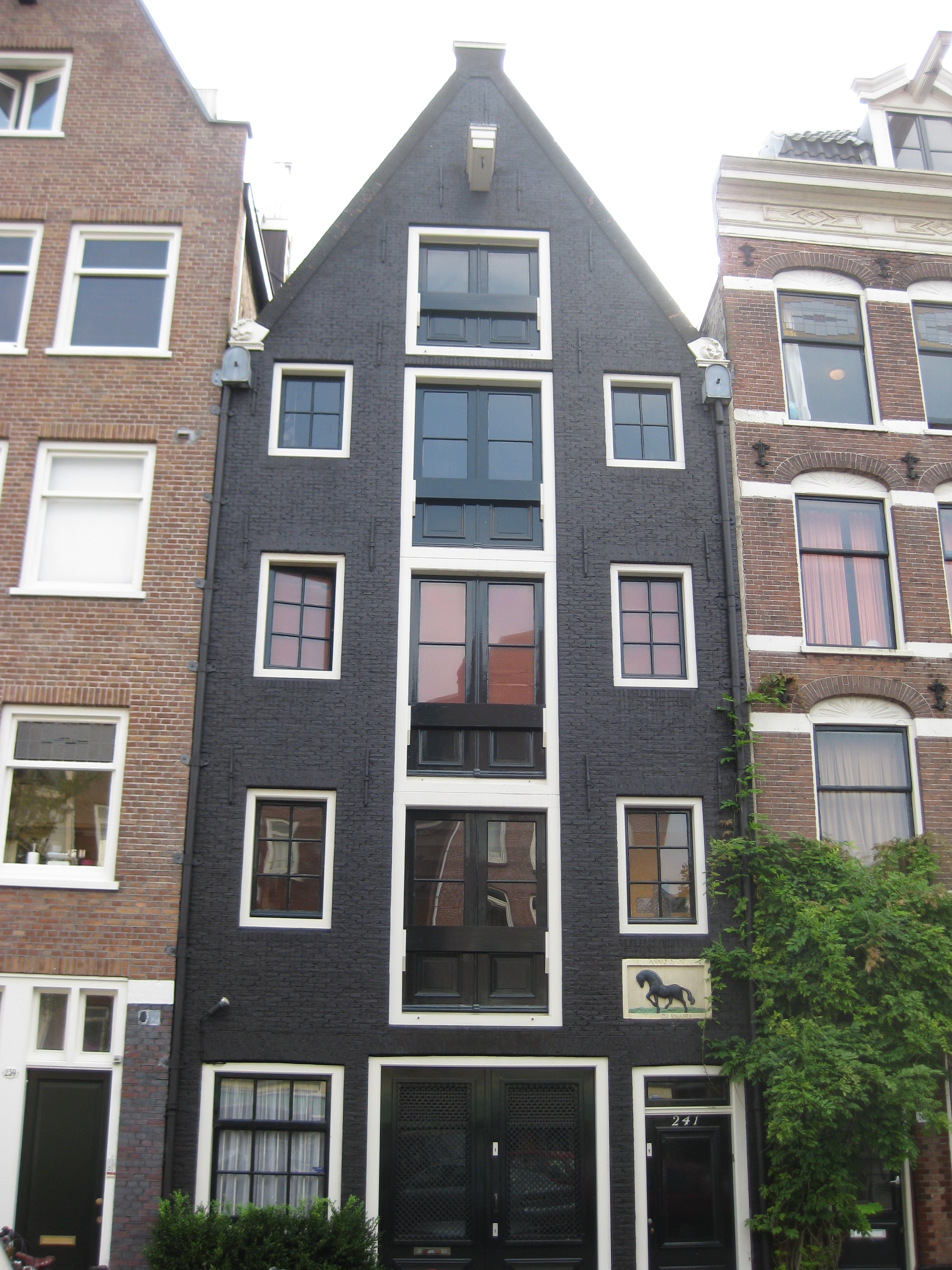
Lindengracht 241

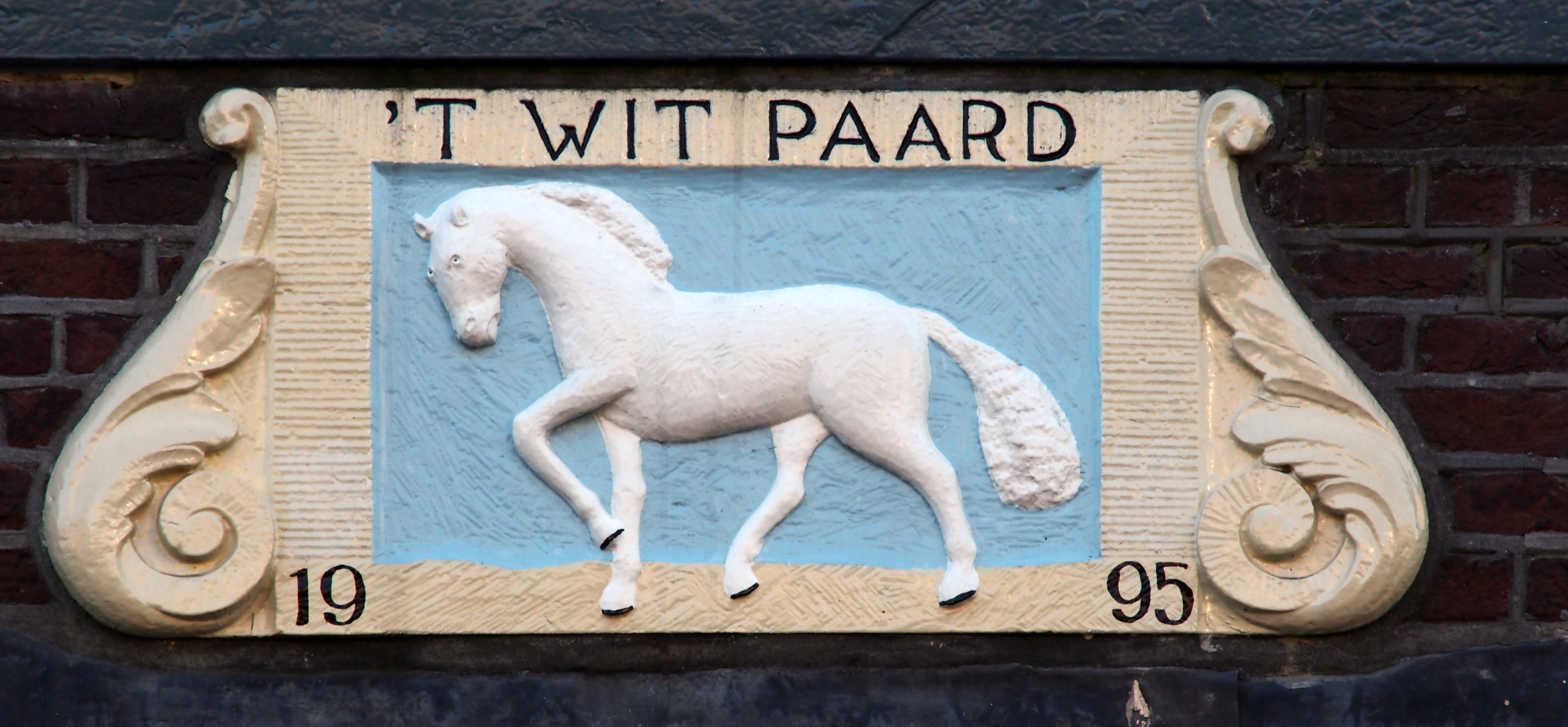
Gablestone Lindengracht 27

== Trivia ==
- The musician Harry de Groot composed the song that old Lindengracht. The words are by Pi Vèriss.
- The village of Vreeland, in the municipality of Stichtse Vecht, also has a Linden canal which still has water.
- There is a waterless Lindengracht in Opmeer in the province of North Holland .
