= List of streets in Amsterdam =

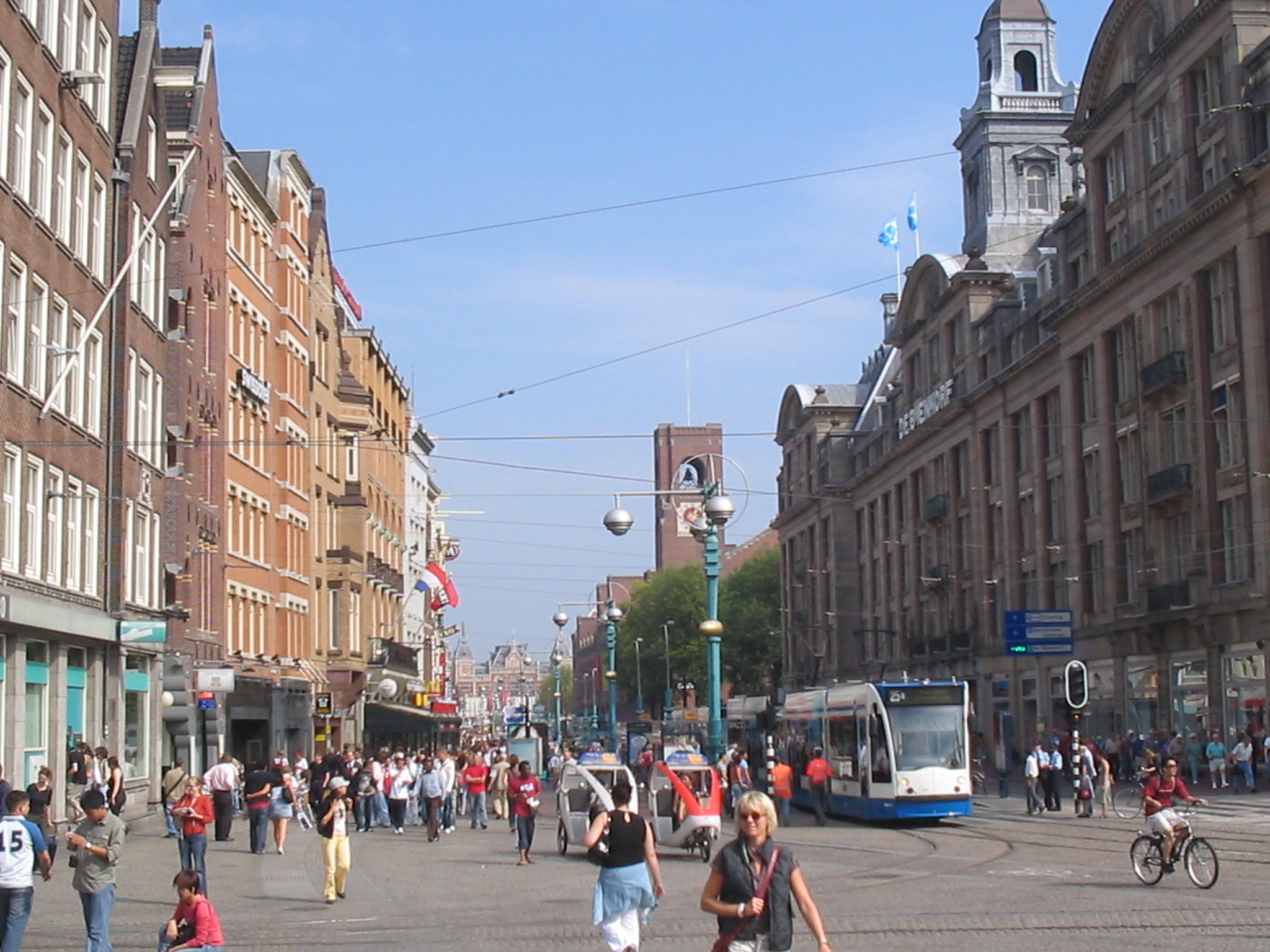
The Damrak in 2005, as viewed from Dam Square.

== A ==
- Anjeliersgracht Now named Westerstraat, the street filled-in in 1861.

== D ==
- Damrak
- De Clercqstraat

== E ==
- Elandsgracht
- Eerste jan van der Heijdenstraat

== F ==
- Ferdinand Bolstraat

== G ==
- Goudsbloemgracht

== H ==
- Heiligeweg

== J ==
- Jodenbreestraat

== K ==
- Kalverstraat
- Kromme Waal

== L ==
- Lindengracht

== M ==
- Markengracht
- Marnixstraat is a main street in Amsterdam. A large bus depot and the main police station are located on the street.
- Martelaarsgracht

== N ==
- Nes (Amsterdam)
- Nieuwe Achtergracht
- Nieuwendijk, Amsterdam
- Nieuwezijds Achterburgwal
- Nieuwezijds Voorburgwal

== P ==
- P.C. Hooftstraat
- Palmgracht
- Prins Hendrikkade

== R ==
- Raadhuisstraat
- Rapenburg (Amsterdam)
- Rokin
- Rozengracht

== S ==
- Sarphatistraat
- Scheepstimmermanstraat
- Singel
- Sint Antoniesbreestraat
- Spiegelgracht
- Spuistraat

== V ==
- Vijzelgracht

== W ==
- Warmoesstraat
- Westerstraat

== Z ==
- Zeedijk
- Zomerdijkstraat
- Zwanenburgwal
