= Wauters =

Wauters is a Dutch-language patronymic surname most common in Flanders and may refer to:

- Alphonse Wauters (1817–1898), Belgian archivist and historian
- Ann Wauters (born 1980), Belgian basketball player
- Arthur Wauters (1890–1960), Belgian government minister
- Camille Wauters (1856–1919), Belgian painter
- Charles Augustin Wauters (1808–1869), Belgian painter
- Eddy Wauters (1933–2025), Belgian footballer, banker, and chairman of football club Antwerp
- Emile Wauters (1846–1933), Belgian painter
- Joseph Wauters (politician) (1875–1929), Belgian government minister
- Joseph Wauters (1906–1975), Belgian cyclist
- Koen Wauters (born 1967), Belgian TV presenter and singer in Clouseau
- Kris Wauters (born 1964), Belgian TV presenter and musician in Clouseau
- Marc Wauters (born 1969), Belgian cyclist
- Michaelina Woutiers (c. 1620 – c. 1680), Flemish Baroque painter
- Nick Wauters (born 1970s), Belgian television writer and editor

== See also ==
- Wouters, homonymic surname
