= Belgium Performance Festival =

Belgium festival

The Belgium Performance Festival is an event that hosts many Belgian artists and artists in residence in Belgium who are involved with performance art and performance poetry. The Festival started in 2013 and was curated by Stefan Wouters and Thomas Crombez aiming to create a space where local first generation performance artists could work together, dialogue and pass their experience of an ephemeral practice on to new generations of performance artists. The first edition was held at the Royal Academy of Fine Arts in Antwerp on December 18, 2013 and in the Museum of Contemporary Art in Antwerp on December 19, 2013. Artists involved were Ludo Mich, Saori Kuno, Yiannis Papadopoulos, Cecile De Mul, Philip Meersman, Isabel Tesfazghi, Sven Goyvaerts, Marthe Ramm Fortun, Kasper Bosmans, Despina Zacharopoulou, Ben d'Armagnac, Stefan Wouters, Alain Arias-Misson and Niko Raes.

The second edition took place on January 30, 2016 and was curated by Stefan Wouters with the aid of the Antwerp independent artist collective Sorry. Now, the emphasis shifted from an institutional context towards a homely environment, a townhouse, in order to blur the boundaries between the artist and public. Invited artists were Ria Pacqée, Beati Jolanda Niesyta, Maria Degrève, Karina Beumer, Saori Kuno, Philip Meersman, Jo Caimo, Mikes Poppe, Peter Fengler, Tina Cake Line, Erin Helsen, Timo van Grinsven, Liesje De Laet, Stefan Wouters, Messieurs Delmotte, Eddy Ausloos, Johanna van Overmeir and Anna Kosarewska. Highlights of the second edition were a pop-up performance of an uninvited and anonymous performance artist and a spontaneous intervention of one of Belgium's best known performance artists, Danny Devos.

The third edition, How to Document a Performance, took place on October 4 and 5, 2016 and was again curated by Stefan Wouters, this time with the aid of the Kultuurkaffee.
