= Jan Micker =

Dutch Golden Age landscape painter (1598–1664)

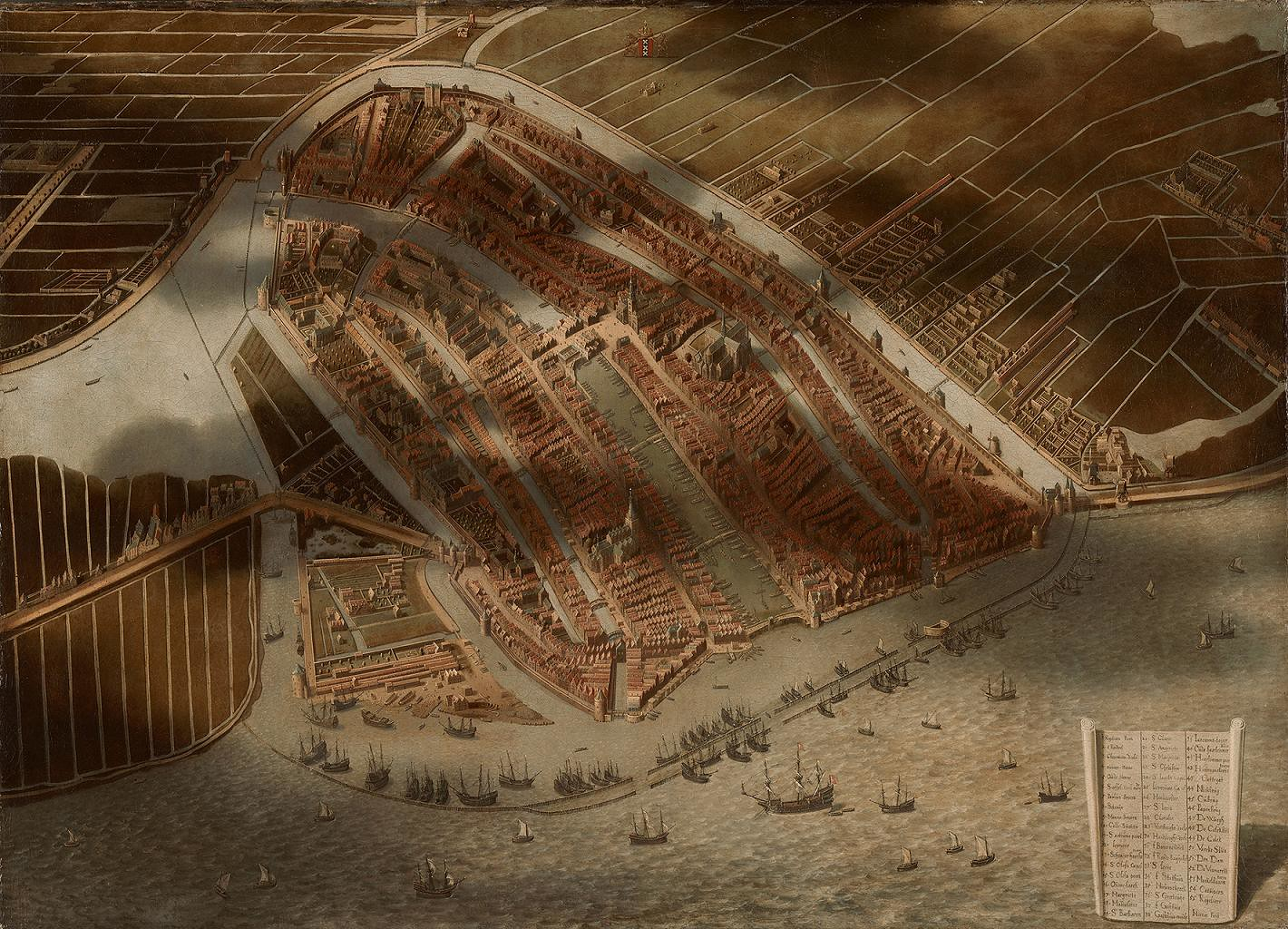
"A Bird's Eye View of Amsterdam", faithful copy of Cornelis Anthonisz' 1538 view of the city, but showing cloud shadows over the land, 1652

Jan Christiaensz Micker (1598 in Amsterdam – 1664 in Amsterdam), was a Dutch Golden Age landscape painter.

== Biography ==
Houbraken mentioned him as a "gemeen schilder" who was the first drawing teacher of Jan Baptist Weenix.

According to the RKD besides being the first teacher of Jan Baptist Weenix he painted staffage in paintings by Jan Fransz Dammeroen, Hans Jurriaensz van Baden and Joachim Govertsz Camphuysen. In 1653 he lived on the Prinsengracht across from the Noorderkerk in the house called 't Wapen van Amsterdam. When he died he lived on the Lindengracht, and was buried in the Noorderkerk.
