= Hendrina Wouters =

Hendrina Wouters (c. 1718 – 17 December 1746) was a convicted Dutch murderer.

Hendrina was married to Casper Schuurveld, who was an apprentice wine trader. They had two sons. The murders, trial and execution were noted in the diary of Jacob Bicker Raije. On 1 October 1746, the body of widow Tommel was discovered in her home on the Palmgracht. At first the maid Marie was suspected of the murder, but in the following days body parts belonging to the maid were discovered in the waters in Amsterdam.

Suspicion then fell on Hendrina Wouters. Interrogation started in November and in December, Hendrina was found guilty of the robbery-murder of the baker's widow Tommel and her maid Marie. She was executed on the breaking wheel, which was an unusual method of execution for women. This form of execution was rarely used by that time in Amsterdam during the 18th century. The case attracted a lot of attention in the Netherlands.
