= P.C. Hooftstraat =

Street in Amsterdam

- OGÉR store at the P.C. Hooftstraat in Amsterdam
- Interactive map of P.C. Hooftstraat
- Namesake: Pieter Corneliszoon Hooft
- Location: Amsterdam, Netherlands
- Coordinates: 52°21′34″N 4°52′41″E
- From: Stadhouderskade
- Major junctions: Hobbemastraat; Van Baerlestraat
- To: Vondelpark

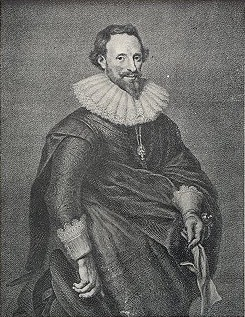
Portrait of Pieter Corneliszoon Hooft

P.C. Hooftstraat is a high-end shopping street in Amsterdam, Netherlands. Built alongside the construction of nearby Vondel Park, it was named after Pieter Corneliszoon Hooft (1581–1647), a Dutch historian, poet and playwright, in 1876. The street is located in stadsdeel Amsterdam Oud-Zuid and runs from Stadhouderskade to Vondel Park. It is intersected by Hobbemastraat and Van Baerlestraat.

In 1883, a horsecar service started in this street to connect Dam square with Willemsparkweg, one of the then-new neighbourhoods for the well-heeled in Amsterdam-Zuid. In 1903 the horsecar service was replaced by new electric tramway line 2. One year later, another tramway, line 3, also included the street in its route. This tramway existed until tracks were added on Vondel Bridge and both lines switched to use the shorter route.

In the past two decades, P.C. Hooftstraat has transformed into the leading upscale shopping street in the Netherlands, putting the Dutch capital firmly on the map as a luxury shopping destination along the way. The number of luxury brands has seen an accelerated growth, and to such an extent, that Amsterdam has surpassed the retail arenas of Antwerp and Brussels, which have longtime been the leading luxury shopping destinations in the Benelux region.

== Trivia ==
- A derogatory term for sport utility vehicles (SUVs) in Dutch is "P.C. Hoofttractor" or because these cars are generally seen as an ostentatious display of wealth, and they can often be spotted in P.C. Hooftstraat.
- On 9 March 2006 the first Glamour Stiletto run was held in P.C. Hooftstraat, a 75-metre run on stiletto heels (which must be at least 7 cm (3 in) high). The prize, a EUR 10,000 shopping spree in P.C. Hooftstraat, was won by Nancy Karels.
- In 2008 the P.C. Catwalk Event was held in P.C. Hooftstraat with a spectacular 320-metre runway.
- Between 2007 and 2011, a KRO TV show aired which focused on the Oud-Zuid area of Amsterdam, and in particular shopping artery P.C. Hooftstraat. The show was called "Bij ons in de PC" ("In our P.C.") and was presented by Jort Kelder.
- Although "P.C. Hooftstraat" is generally associated with the high-end shopping artery in Amsterdam, many other places in the Netherlands also have a P.C. Hooftstraat, including: Utrecht, Breda, Oss, Nijverdal, Putten, Heemskerk, Hof van Twente, Hengelo, Gemert, Haarlem, Sliedrecht, Papendrecht, Tilburg, Zwijndrecht, Zwolle, Leeuwarden and Flushing. Most of these streets are more residential than the one in Amsterdam.

== See also ==
- List of streets in Amsterdam
