= Jan Ernst van der Pek =

Dutch architect (1865–1919)

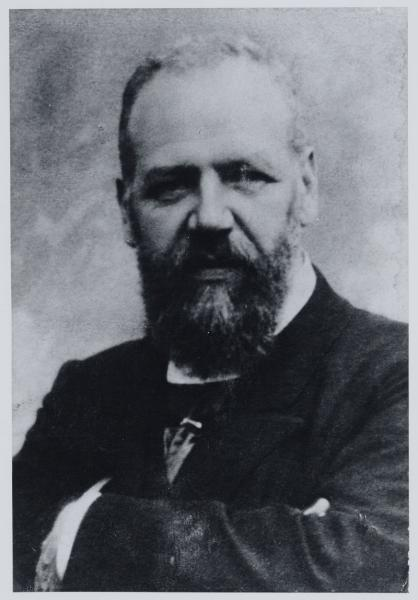
Jan Ernst van der Pek, 1910

Jan Ernst van der Pek (5 October 1865 - 23 March 1919) was a Dutch architect.

Van der Pek was a significant contributor towards the development of public housing in the Netherlands. He designed complexes of workers' houses in Amsterdam that were of solid construction and affordable. His buildings served as an example for other architects.

== Literature ==
Jan Ernst van der Pek 1865–1919, Pionier van de volkshuisvesting, Carol Schade, BONASreeks/Nederlands Architectuurinstituut, deel 46, 2010.
