= Stefan Wouters =

Belgian visual artist

Stefan Wouters (born 1972) is a Belgian visual artist, curator and researcher of Happenings and Performance art. Wouters was born in Antwerp. While working in the family business of his parents, he studied painting and drawing at the Royal Academy of Fine Arts in Antwerp (DKO). He soon started to exhibit his paintings and the work of his fellow students in and around Antwerp.

Inspired by the art history classes he attended at the Royal Academy of Fine Arts, Wouters decided to study Art History and Archaeology at the Free University of Brussels (VUB). During these studies he worked as a translator and a writer for the communication department of the Centre for Fine Arts, Brussels. His interest increasingly shifted towards time-based art forms and decided to write a Ph.D. exploring the relation between Happenings and subcultures during the 1960s.

In order to finance his studies he collaborated for the online database Belgium is Happening and participated as a performance artist in the international performance group Virtual Vérité, led by Los Angeles–based artist Harry Gamboa, Jr. These events also marked the beginnings of the Belgium Performance Festival in which Wouters was assigned as a curator.

In 2015 he received a double Ph.D in Art History and Archaeology (Free University of Brussels) and in Theater Sciences (University of Antwerp) for his research on the Belgian Happening scene of the mid-1960s. The same year he was asked to give a lecture on the afterlife of Dada during the 56th edition of the Venice Biennale.

Currently Wouters is a researcher and professor at the Free University of Brussels.

== Performances (selection) ==
- The Cranes of Antwerp, 2012.
- Continental Drift, Bruges 2012.
- Floating in Flanders, Antwerp 2012.
- Day Two in Three Parts, Royal Academy of Fine Arts, Antwerp 2012.
- The Human Loom, Royal Academy of Fine Arts, Antwerp 2013.
- A Tribute to the Happy Space Maker, Museum of Modern Art, Antwerp 2013.
- Untunnel, Antwerp 2013.
- Calibre Libre, Antwerp 2013.
- Mexican Bridge Performance, Antwerp 2014.
- Brussels Underground Poetry Festival, Brussels 2014, 2015.
- Better Start with the Dessert, Antwerp 2014.
- Was het maar zo Makkelijk, Rotterdam 2016.
- Megaphone Ensemble, Fête de la Musique, Brussels 2016.
