= Palmgracht =

Canal in Amsterdam

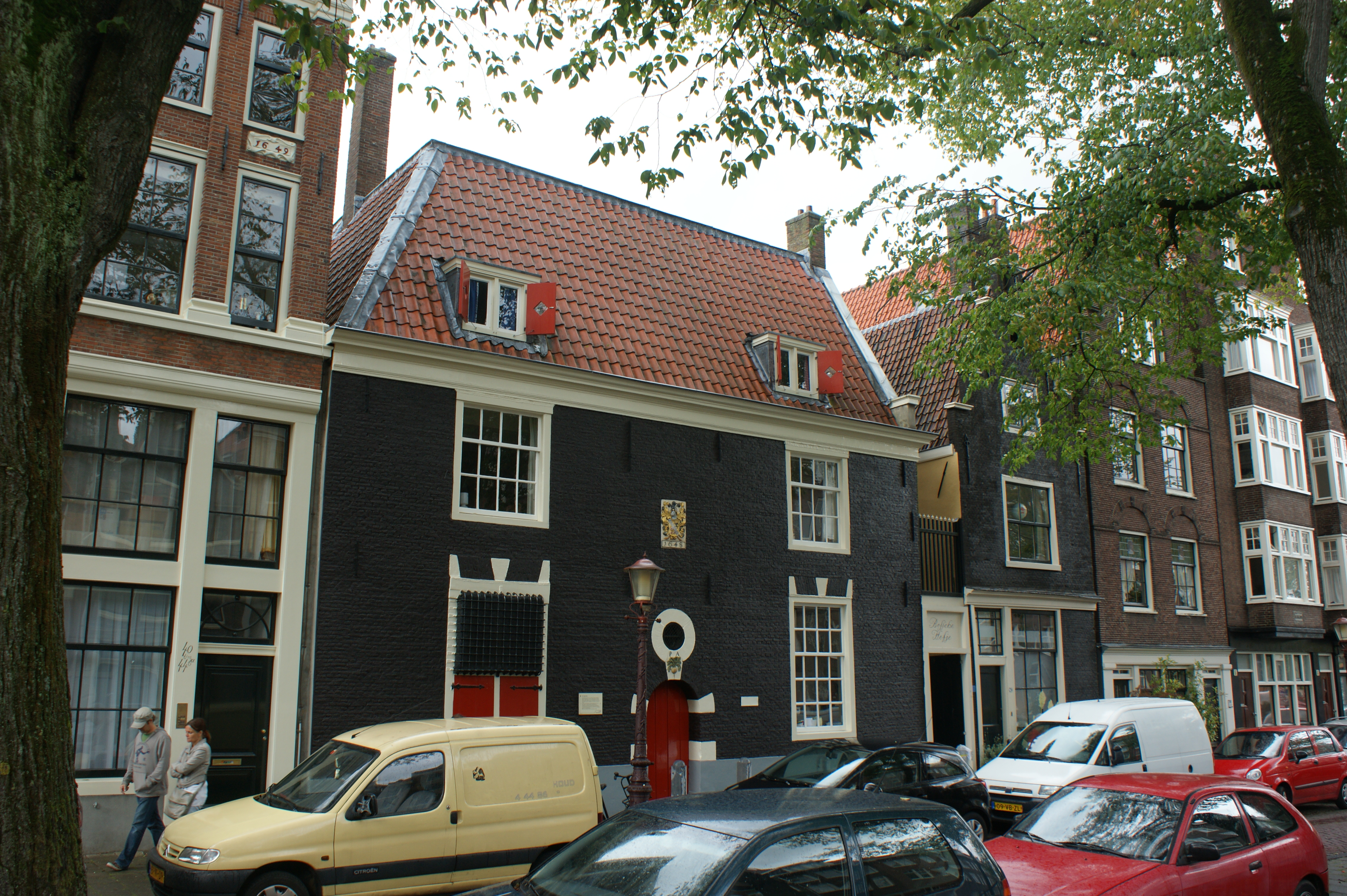
- Raepenhofje on the Palmgracht

- Location within Amsterdam
- Location: Amsterdam
- Postal code: 1015
- Coordinates: 52.382064°N 4.883467°E
- East end: Brouwersgracht
- To: Lijnbaansgracht

The Palmgracht (Dutch pronunciation: [ˈpɑl(ə)mˌɣrɑxt]; Palm Canal) is a street and former canal in the Jordaan neighborhood of the Centrum district of Amsterdam.

== Location ==
The canal, part of the western Grachtengordel (canal belt), was backfilled in 1895. It connected Brouwersgracht and Lijnbaansgracht. Palmstraat runs parallel to the Palmgracht. Palmdwarsstraat and the Kromme Palmstraat are side streets. The third side street, the Driehoekstraat, is in the northernmost point of the Jordaan.

== History ==
The canal originated when the canal belt was dug south from the Brouwersgracht in 1612. Eventually there were eleven canals in the Jordaan. From 1857, various canals were backfilled, including the Palmgracht in 1895 . The reasons for filling them were the poor water quality and the need to create space for the increasing traffic. Since then, various plans have been made to backfill canals, but have met with much opposition from shopkeepers and market traders.

The "Raepenhofje" was founded in 1648 on Palmgracht 28–38. Above the entrance is a facing brick with the family crest of founder Pieter Adriaensz Raep and a stone with the foundation year. The adjacent 'Bosschehofje' (nos. 20–26), founded by Arend Dirkszoon Bosch, also dates from 1648. This consists of only a stepped gable with some small houses behind it.

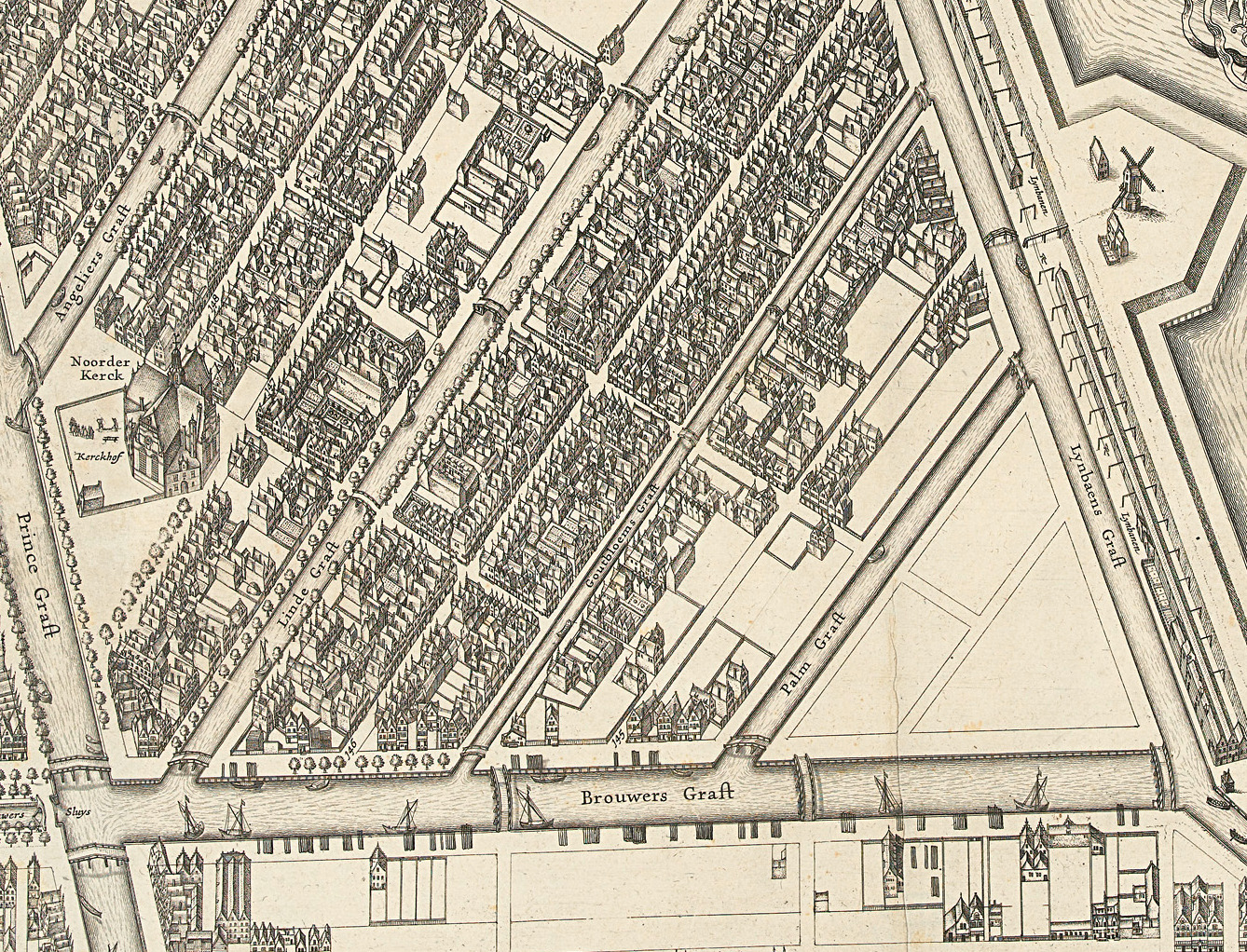
1625 map seen from the north. Brouwers Graft (bottom), Lynbaens Graft (right). Diagonals: Palm Graft (lower right), Goutbloems Graft, Linde Graft, Angeliera Graft

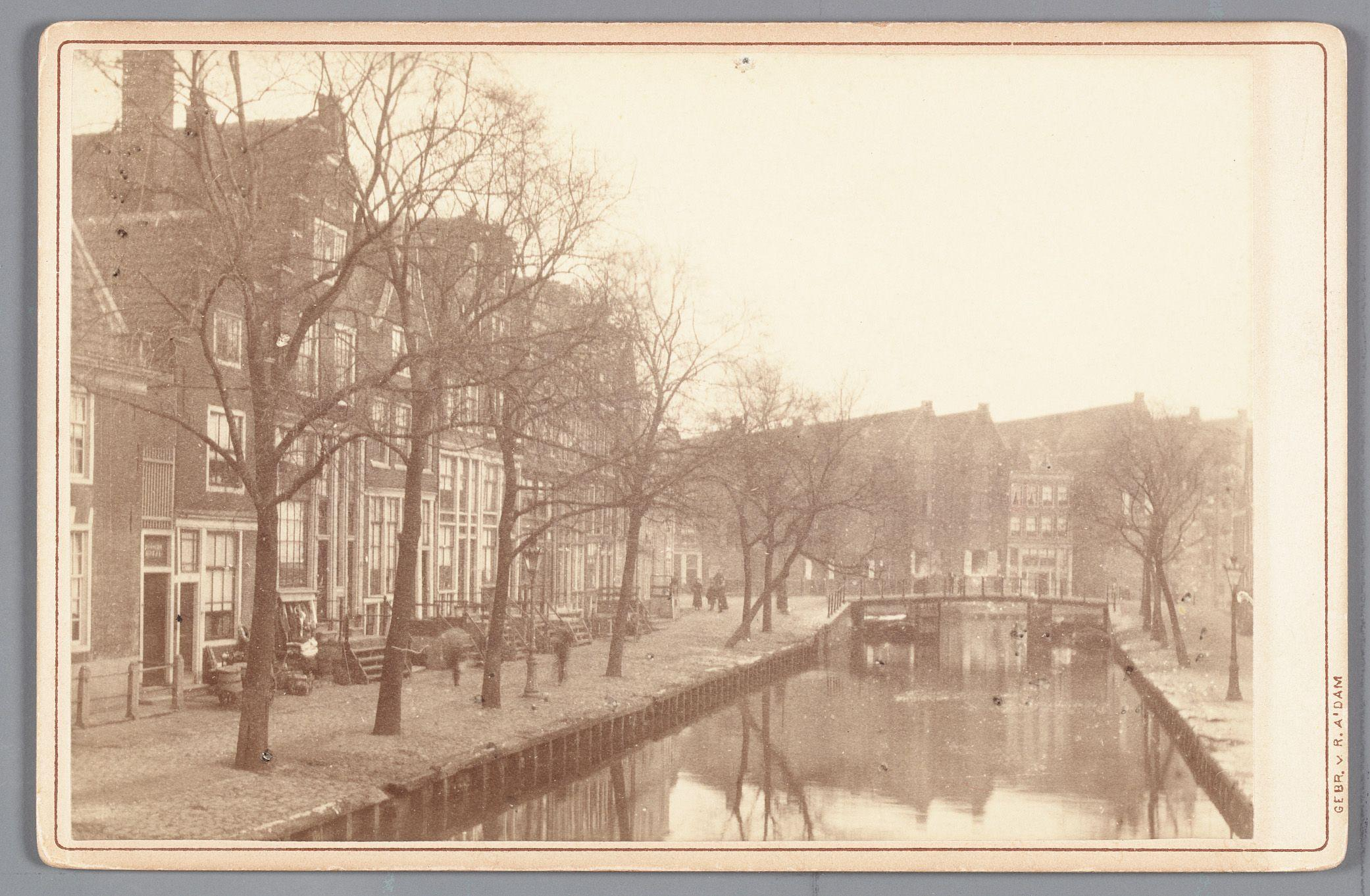
Palmgracht looking towards Brouwersgracht before 1895.

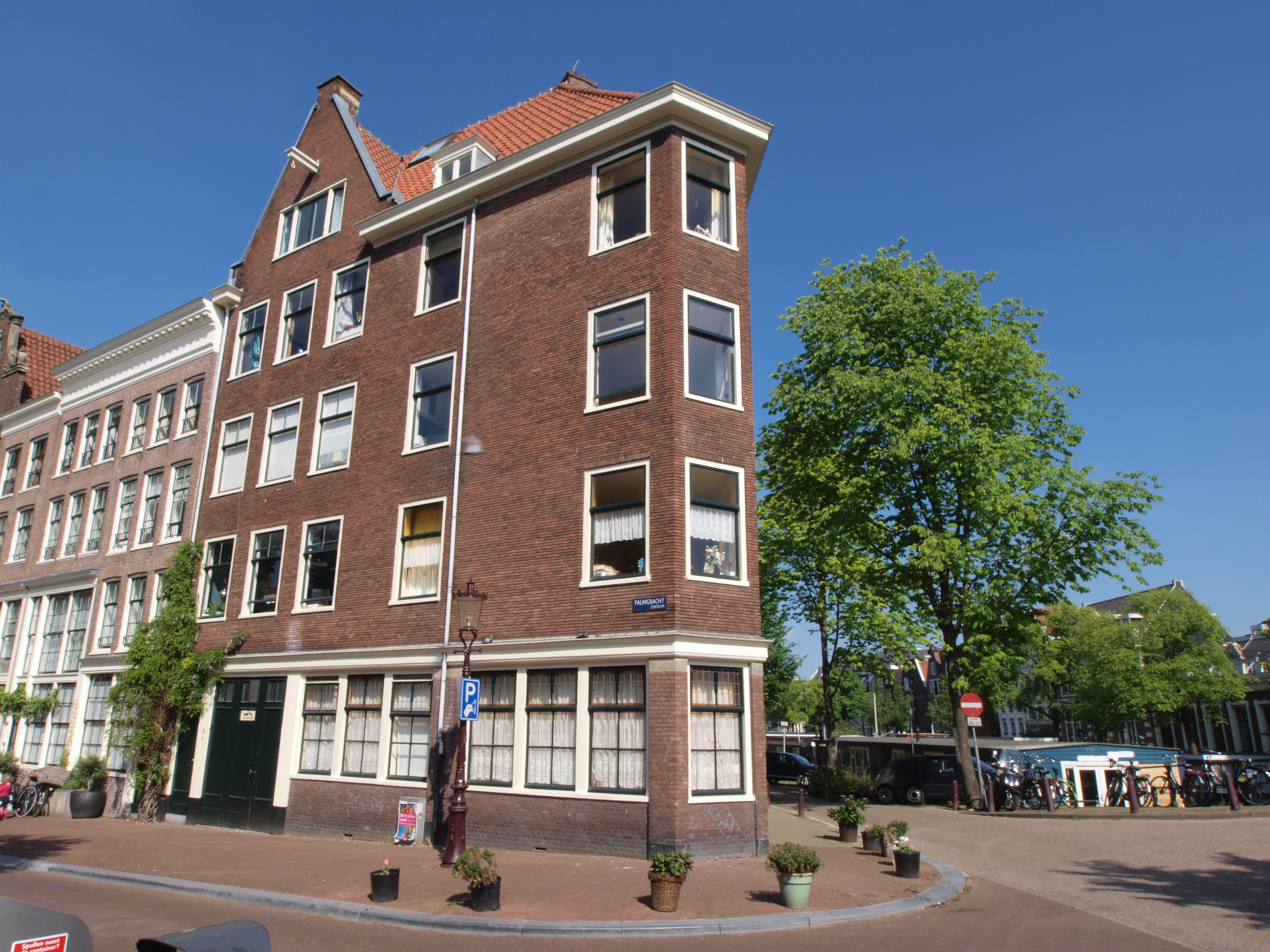
Palmgracht corner Brouwersgracht.
