= Jean Claude Wouters =

Jean Claude Wouters (born 1956, Brussels, Belgium) is a multidisciplinary artist, dancer, film maker and painter. He studied art at ERG Brussels, film at INSAS Brussels, performing art at MUDRA Brussels. He lives and works in Los Angeles after stints in Paris, Italy, Dubai, Brussels and Tokyo.

Wouters received the Golden Gate Award at the San Francisco International Film Festival in 1992. In Paris, he directed films for Chanel, Lancôme, Yves Saint Laurent, to name a few.

Wouters has had several solo exhibitions. In 2007 Wouters collaborated with the designer Marc Jacobs on a project for Bloomingdale's in New York.
