= Anjeliersgracht =

Canal in Amsterdam

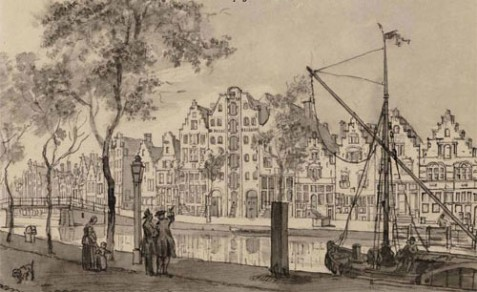
- Anjeliersgracht c. 1775, seen to the north (even side)

- Location within Amsterdam
- Location: Amsterdam
- Postal code: 1016
- Coordinates: 52.378415°N 4.883358°E

The Anjeliersgracht (Carnation Canal) is a former canal in the Jordaan neighborhood of Amsterdam. After being backfilled in 1861, it is now Westerstraat.

Anjeliersgracht is located between Marnixstraat and Noordermarkt. The canal led from Prinsengracht just south of Noorderkerk to Lijnbaansgracht. Anjeliersstraat runs parallel to the former Anjeliersgracht, today's Westerstraat.

== History ==
Anjeliersgracht was dug in the 17th century. Houses started to be built along the canal in 1650. Due to the damp, sandy soil, some of the historic buildings suffer from subsidence.

A distillery for liqueurs, bitters and elixirs was founded on the Anjeliersgracht in 1684 by Jacob Bols, nephew of Lucas Bols. The company had a house, yard, distillery and store. The neighborhood around the "Rinsche Anijsvat" distillery held artisanal companies, distilleries, beer brewers and ship's bakeries. The company became the property of Frederik van Zuylekom in 1754, and in the 19th century was merged with Levert & Co. to become Van Zuylekom, Levert & Co. The company was still at Westerstraat 176–180 after the canal was drained. By 1750 the Noordermarkt near the north of the canal was a popular weekly market. In 1845 it was placed under the municipal administration and stallholders now had to pay rent.

In the mid-19th century Jan Schenkman, author of the children's book Saint Nicholas and his servant (1850), was the head of a school on the Anjeliersgracht, by then one of the dirtiest canals in Amsterdam.

People used it to dispose of garbage and human excrement, and the canal smelled strongly. The school had a high ceiling so the children would avoid infection from diseases such as typhus, cholera and malaria, which were thought to spread through bad vapors.

The Jordaan was Amsterdam's poorest and most densely populated neighborhood. It began to be cleaned up in the mid-19th century by philanthropic construction companies that demolished shacks and built new houses for workers. Anjeliersgracht was drained in 1861, as were many other Amsterdam canals at the time, and in 1862 it was renamed Westerstraat. The reasons for conversion to a street were the poor water quality and the need to handle increasing road traffic. The new Westerstraat, the pride of the city, was the widest street in Amsterdam.

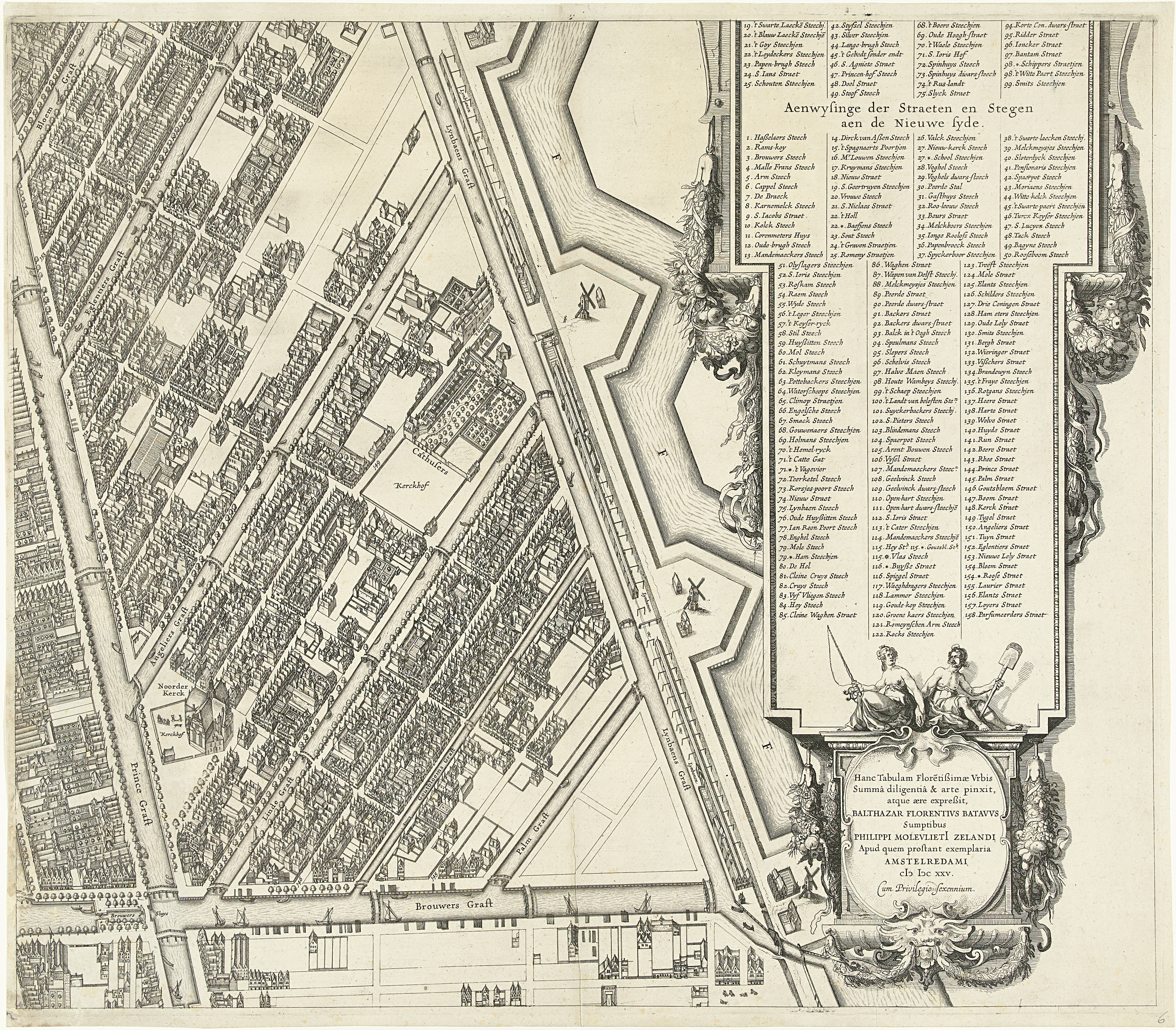
Detail of 1625 map. Amsterdam from north. Bottom (N): Brouwers Graft. Left (E): Prince Graft. Right (W): Lynbaens Graft. Angeliers Graft runs diagonally up from Prince Graft just south of Noorder Kerck to Lynbaens Graft.

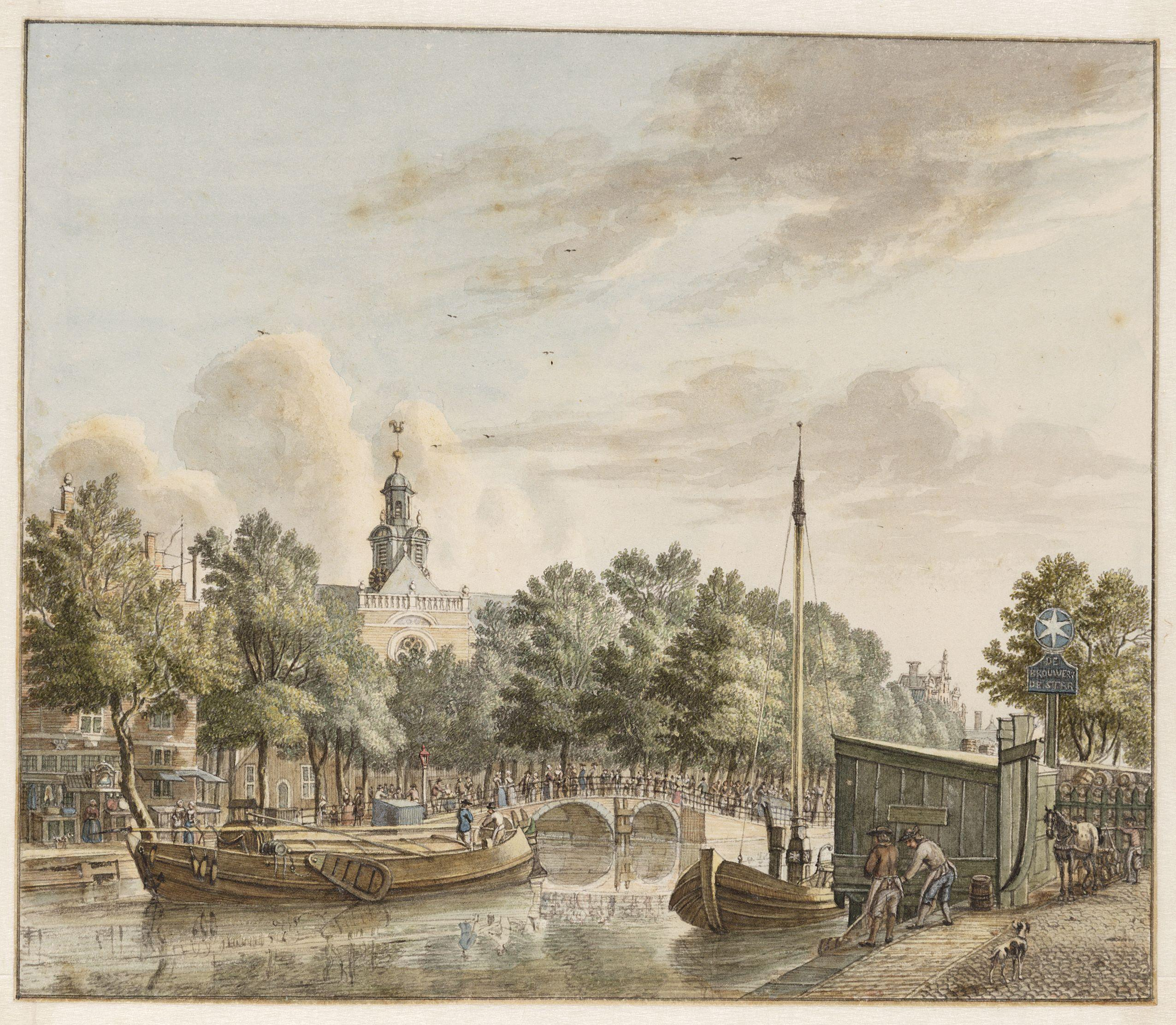
Prinsengracht with De Ster brewery in the foreground on the right. On the other side in the middle is the bridge over the Anjeliersgracht. Jan de Vervaariger Beijer (1758)

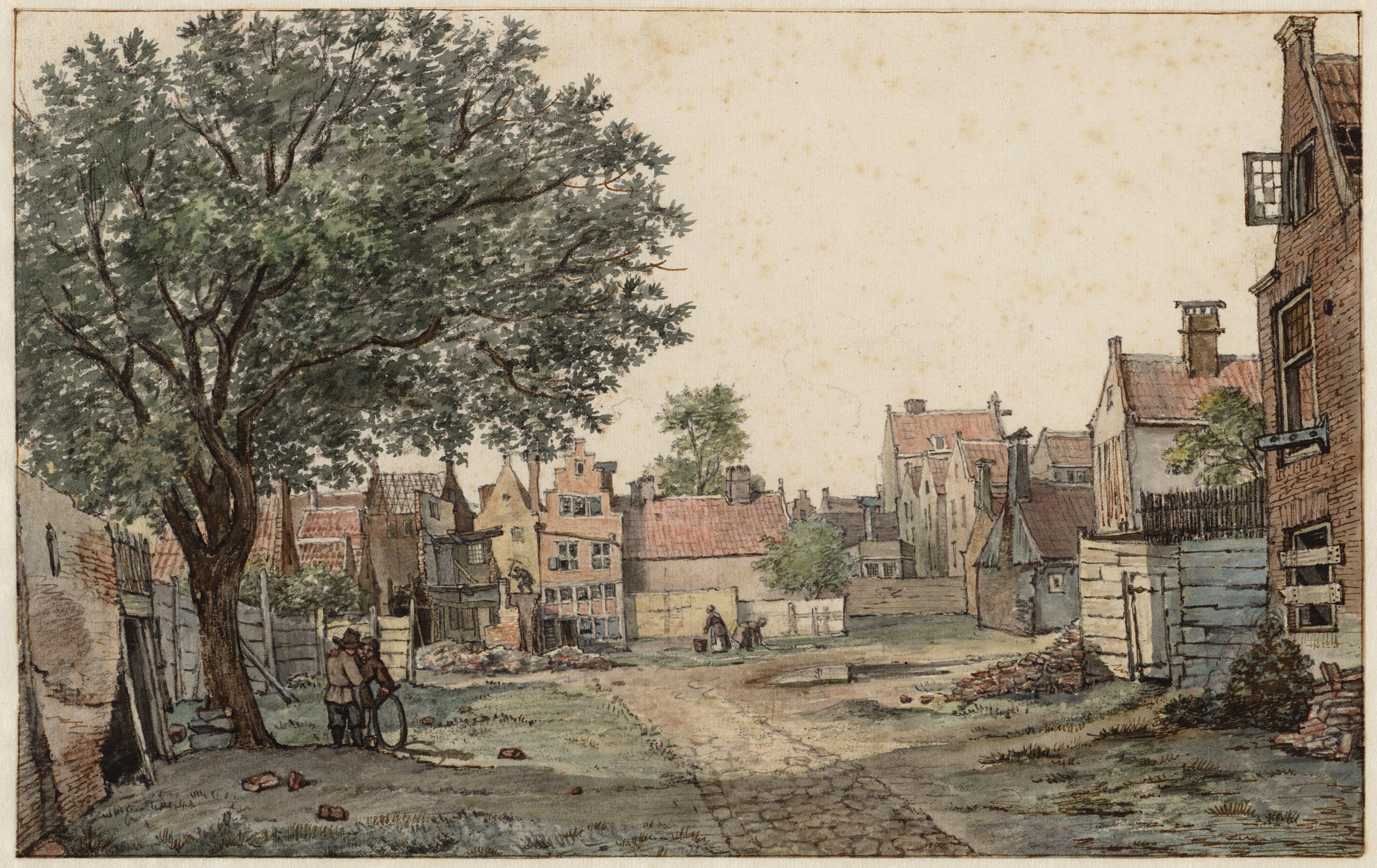
Largely demolished site between Anjeliersstraat, Anjeliersgracht, Tweede Anjeliersdwarsstraat and Lijnbaansgracht. Gerrit Lamberts (1816)

== Trivia ==
The canal has given its name to the Anjeliersgracht (1990), a cargo ship, and the Anjeliersgracht (2009), an inland tanker.

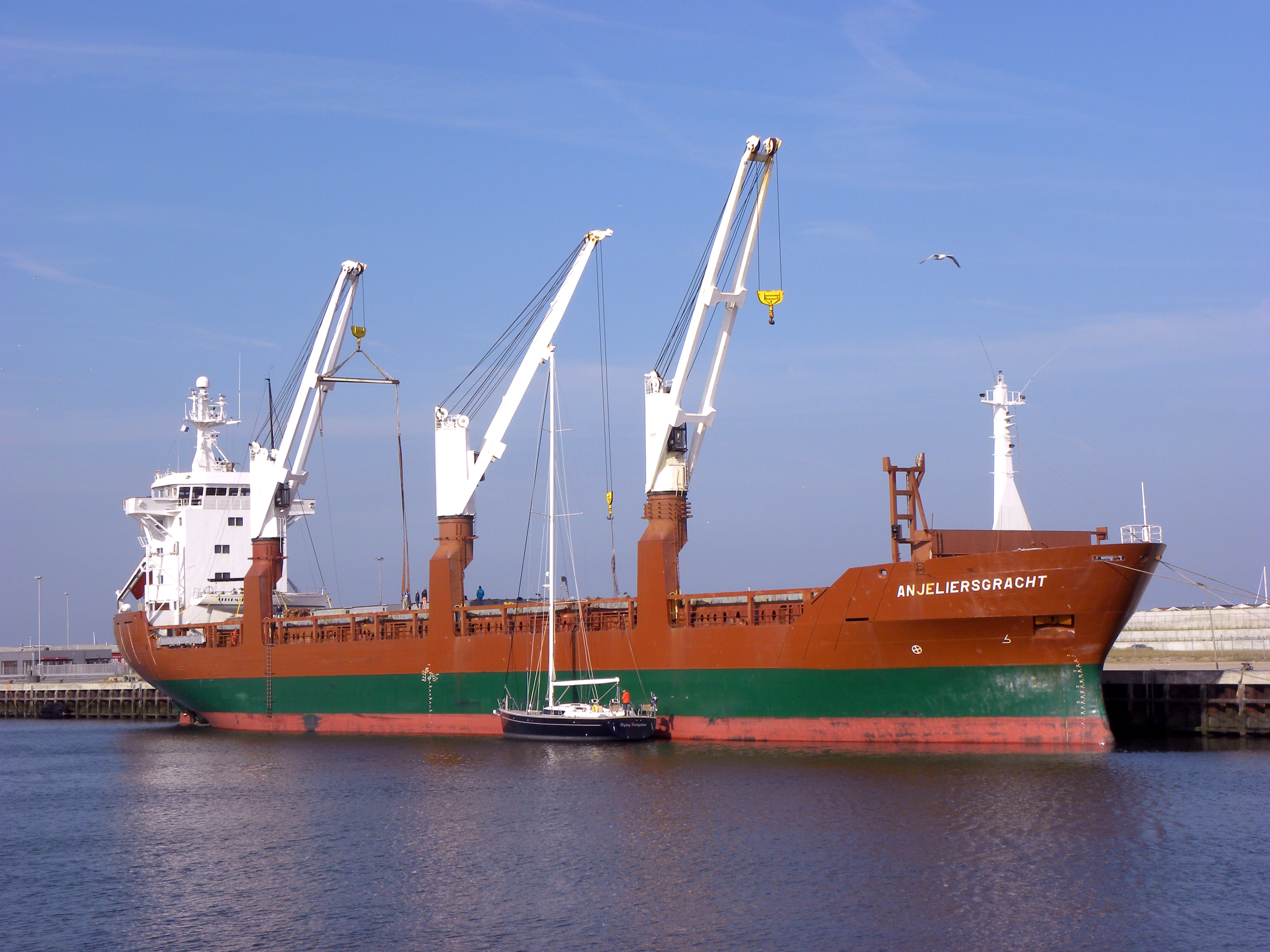
Anjeliersgracht (1990) loading a sailing boat

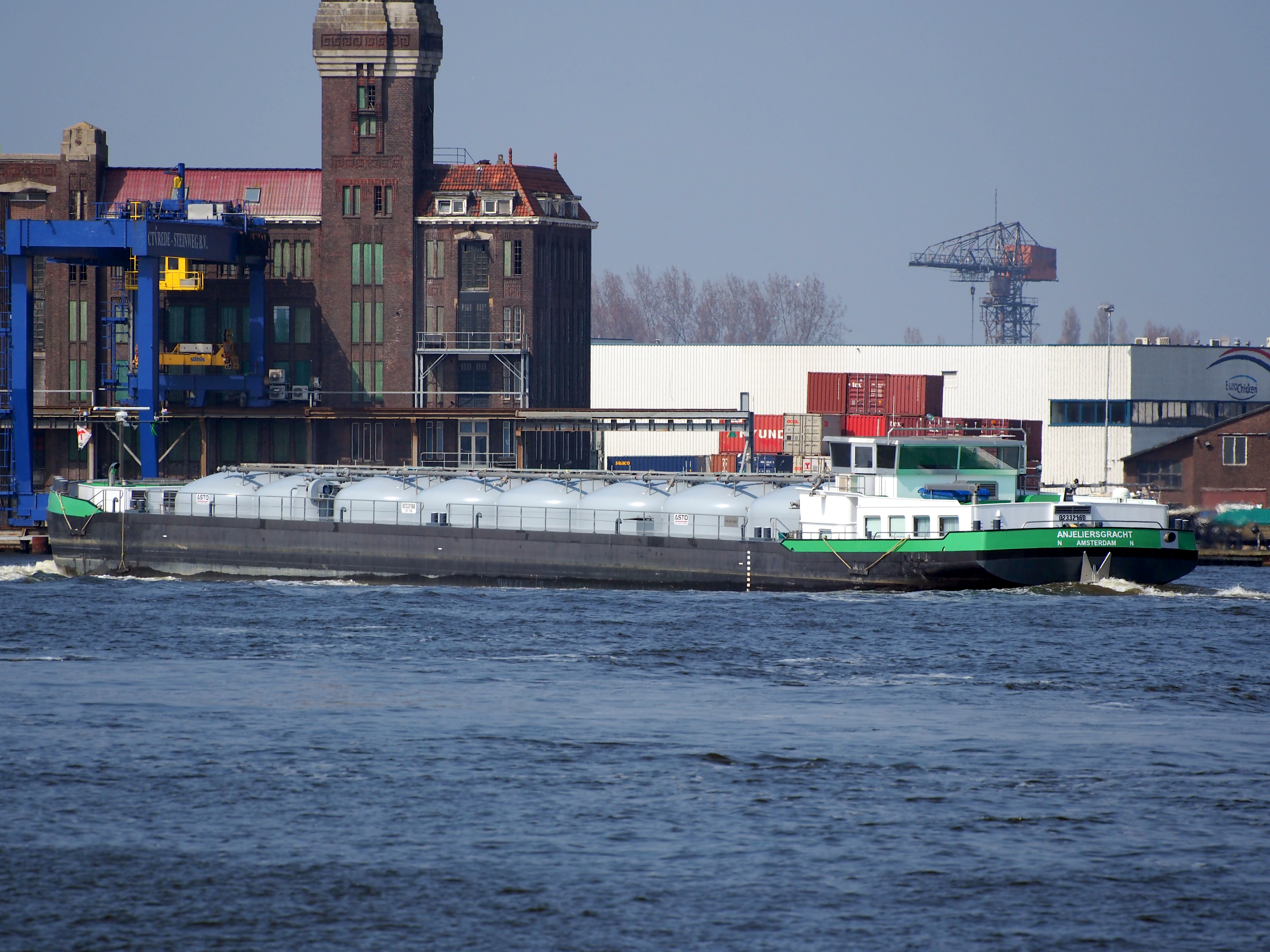
Anjeliersgracht (2009) in the North Sea Canal, Port of Amsterdam

== See also ==
- List of streets in Amsterdam

== Sources ==
- "400 jaar Amsterdamse grachten: De Anjeliersgracht", De Echo, 13 February 2013
- Geschiedenis, Van Zuylekom Levert & Co.
- Over Van Zuylekom, Levert & Co (1684 –1982), Van Zuylekom, Levert & Co.
- Priscilla Tienkamp (26 June 2015), "10 grachten die Amsterdam ooit had", Het Parool
- Sjoerd Karsten (4 November 2013), Amsterdam, Anjeliersgracht
