= Brouwersgracht =

Canal in Amsterdam

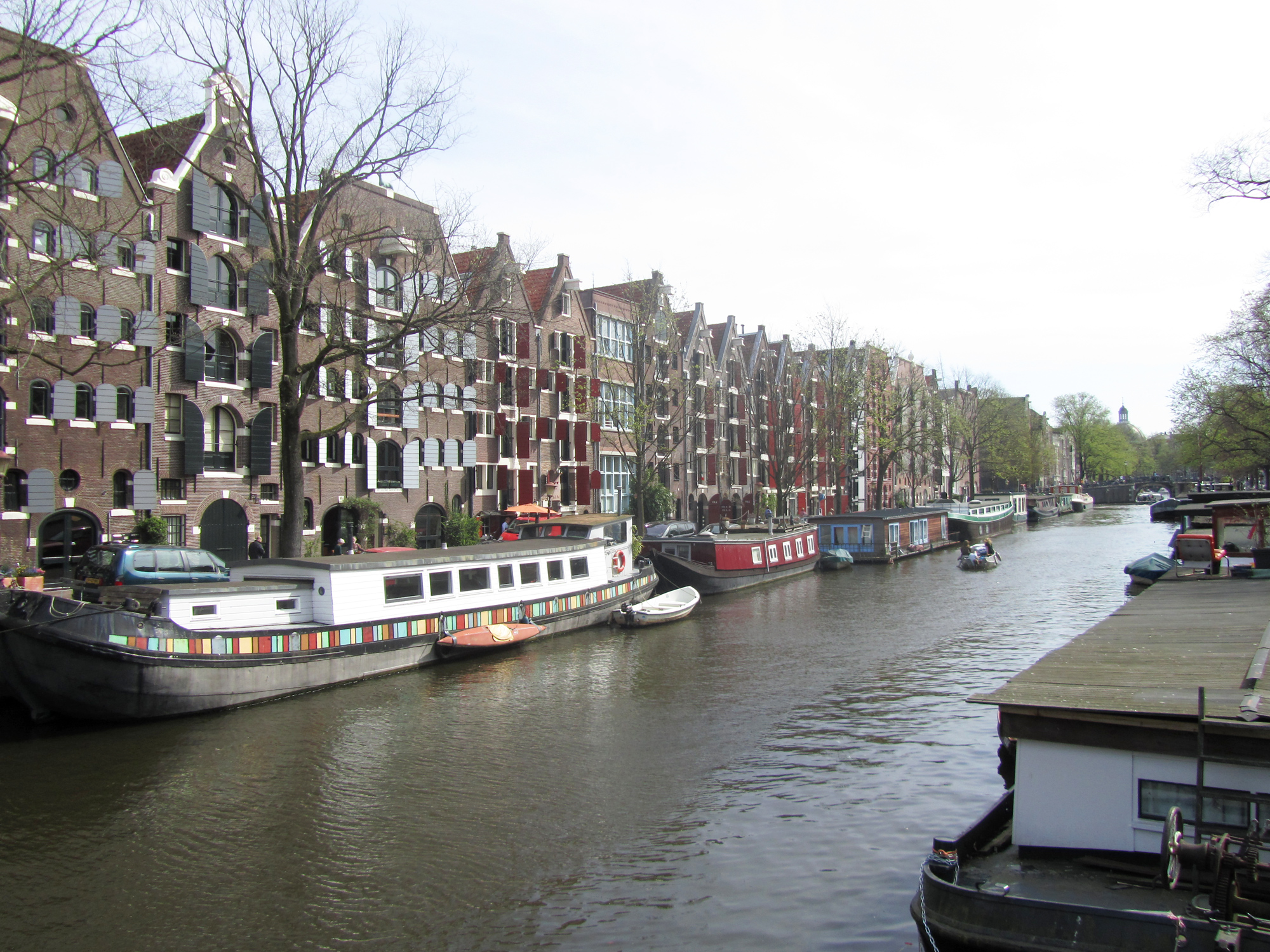
- Warehouses and houseboats on the Brouwersgracht

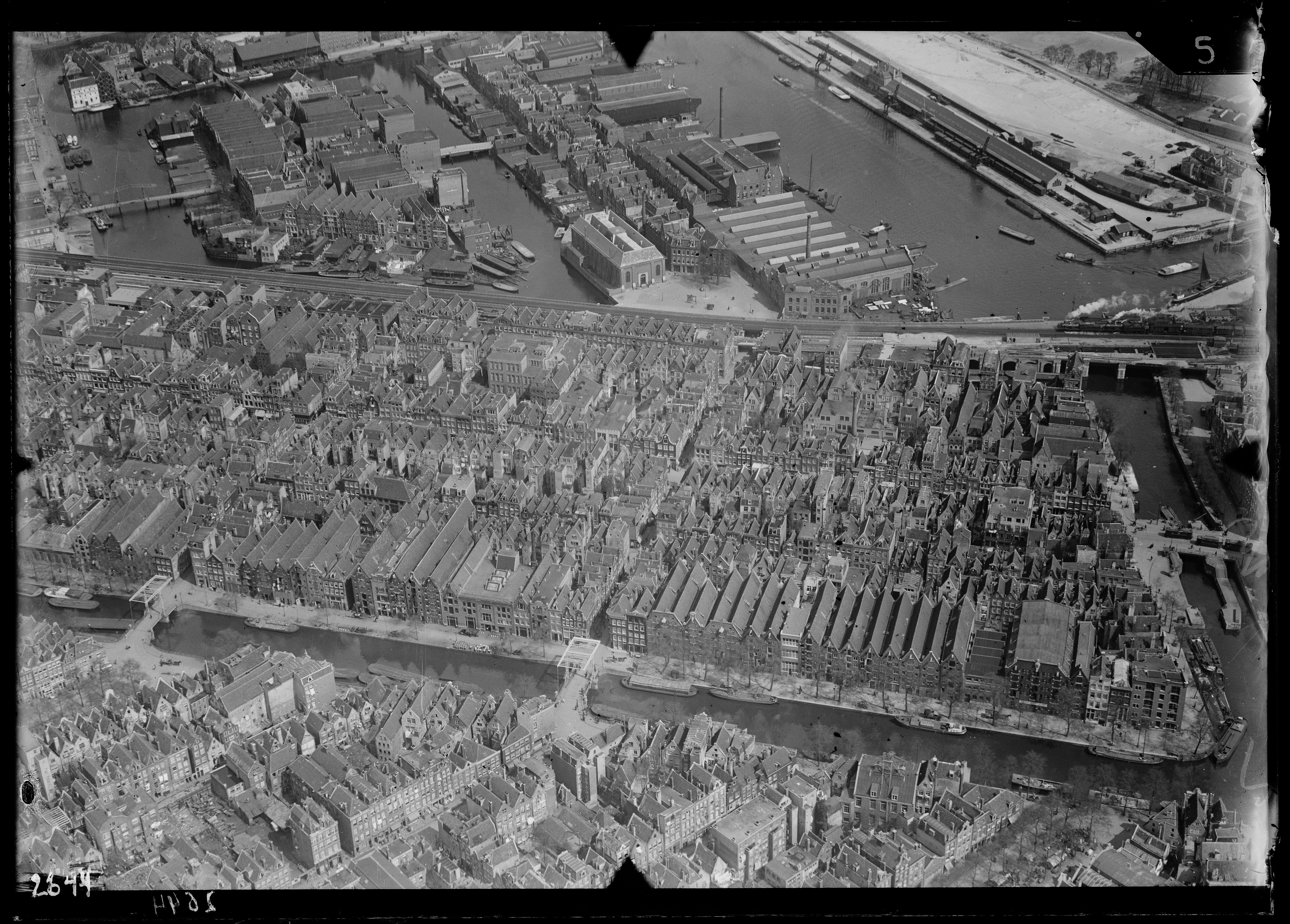
- Aerial view of the Brouwersgracht and surroundings. In the foreground the Brouwersgracht, behind it the Haarlemmerbuurt; circa 1930.
- Location: Amsterdam
- Postal code: 1013, 1015
- Coordinates: 52.381401°N 4.886841°E
- Southeast end: Singel
- To: Singelgracht

Construction
- Construction start: 17th century

The Brouwersgracht is a canal in Amsterdam that connects the Singel with the Singelgracht. The canal marks the northwestern border of the Grachtengordel (canal belt). Between the Prinsengracht and the Singelgracht the Brouwersgracht forms the northern border of the Jordaan neighborhood.

The house numbers of the Lijnbaansgracht, the Prinsengracht, the Keizersgracht, the Herengracht and the Singel start to count from the Brouwersgracht. The Herenmarkt is located between Brouwersgracht no. 62 and no. 68, near the West-Indisch Huis (West Indies House).

In 2007 Brouwersgracht was voted the most beautiful street in Amsterdam by readers of Het Parool out of 150 nominations.

== History ==
The canal took its name in 1594 from the many beer breweries that were to be found in this neighborhood in the sixteenth and seventeenth centuries. Starting in 1612 the canal belt was dug in southern direction from the Brouwersgracht. From 1782, the last Amsterdam distillery of gin and liqueurs was located on the Brouwersgracht at the Driehoekstraat : De Ooievaar. Most warehouses, built for the storage of goods, have been converted into residential houses.

== Architecture ==
- Well-known examples of functional warehouses with their large shutters include Brouwersgracht 196–188 with 'De Appel', 'Grouwe Valk', 'Groene Valk', ' David' and 'Koning David' and 'Spitsbergen' warehouses at nr. 204, "The Little Green Deer" at 206, "The 5th Green Deer" at 208 and "The Big Green Deer" at No. 210.
- The 'Geloof' ('Faith') on Brouwersgracht 218, on the corner of the Binnen Oranjestraat, is an example of the small type of Vingboons neck gable (miniature Vingboons). It was built in 1650. The neck gable with the Doric pilasters that extend up to the neck is in the style of Dutch Baroque architecture. There is a triangular pediment on the pilasters. The facade has three 'ox eyes': sculpted round attic lights.
- Originally Brouwersgracht 218, 220 and 222 formed the 'triplets', 'Faith', 'Hope' and 'Love'. Only the "Faith" still exists. (Brouwersgracht 220 received a clock gable in the 18th century, Brouwersgracht 222 was demolished.)
- Between Brouwersgracht 130 and 134, the narrow passage gives access to the Johannes en Willibrordus old Catholic clandestine church in the interior.
- The national monument Brouwergracht 887-925 has its door on the Brouwersgracht, but is on the former site of Lijnbaansgracht 1–6.
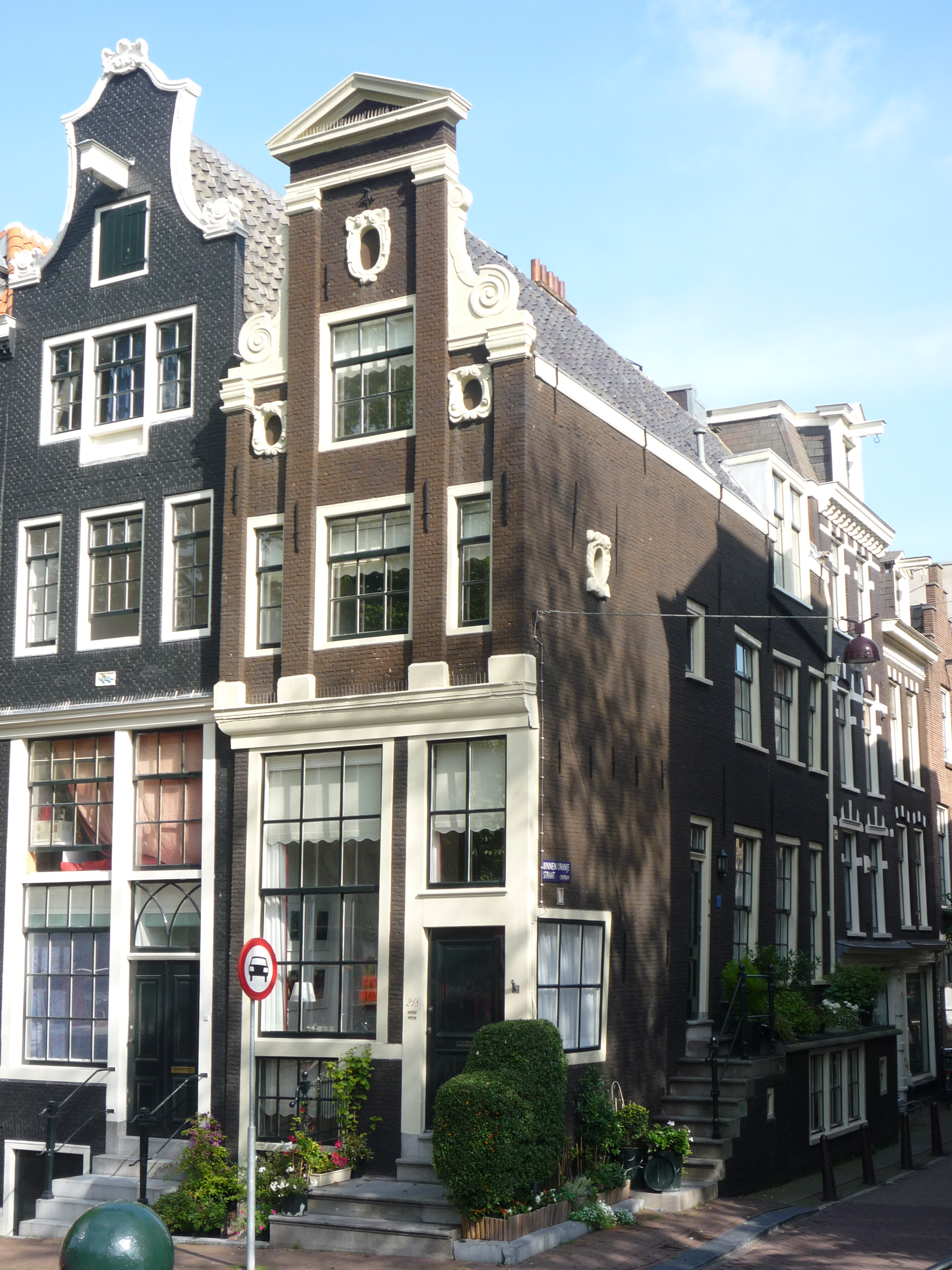
Brouwersgracht 218 with neck gable

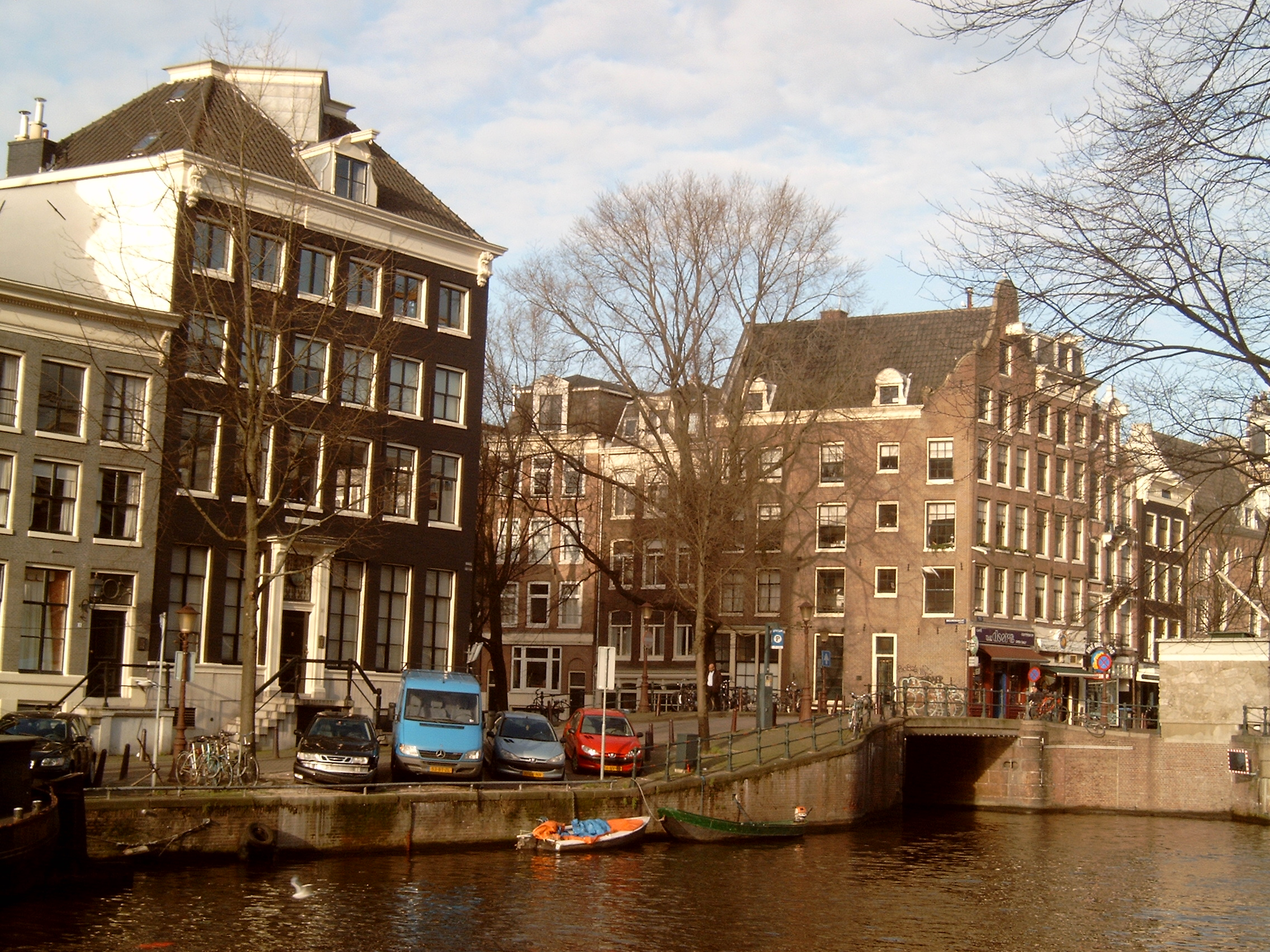
The Singel at the Brouwersgracht, Bridge No. 15.

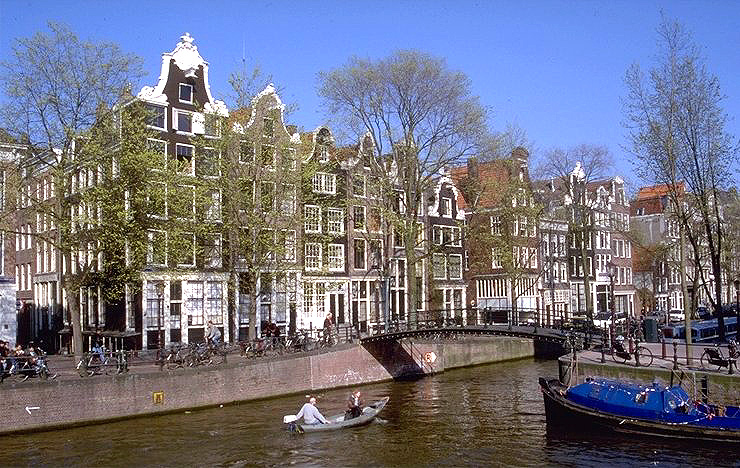
Brouwersgracht at the Herengracht with the 'Melkmeisjesbrug'.

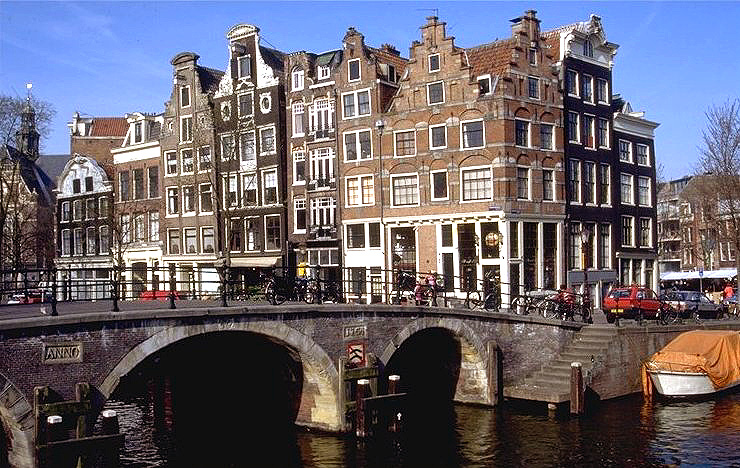
Hoek Prinsengracht / Brouwersgracht with the ' Lekkeresluis '.

== Bridges ==
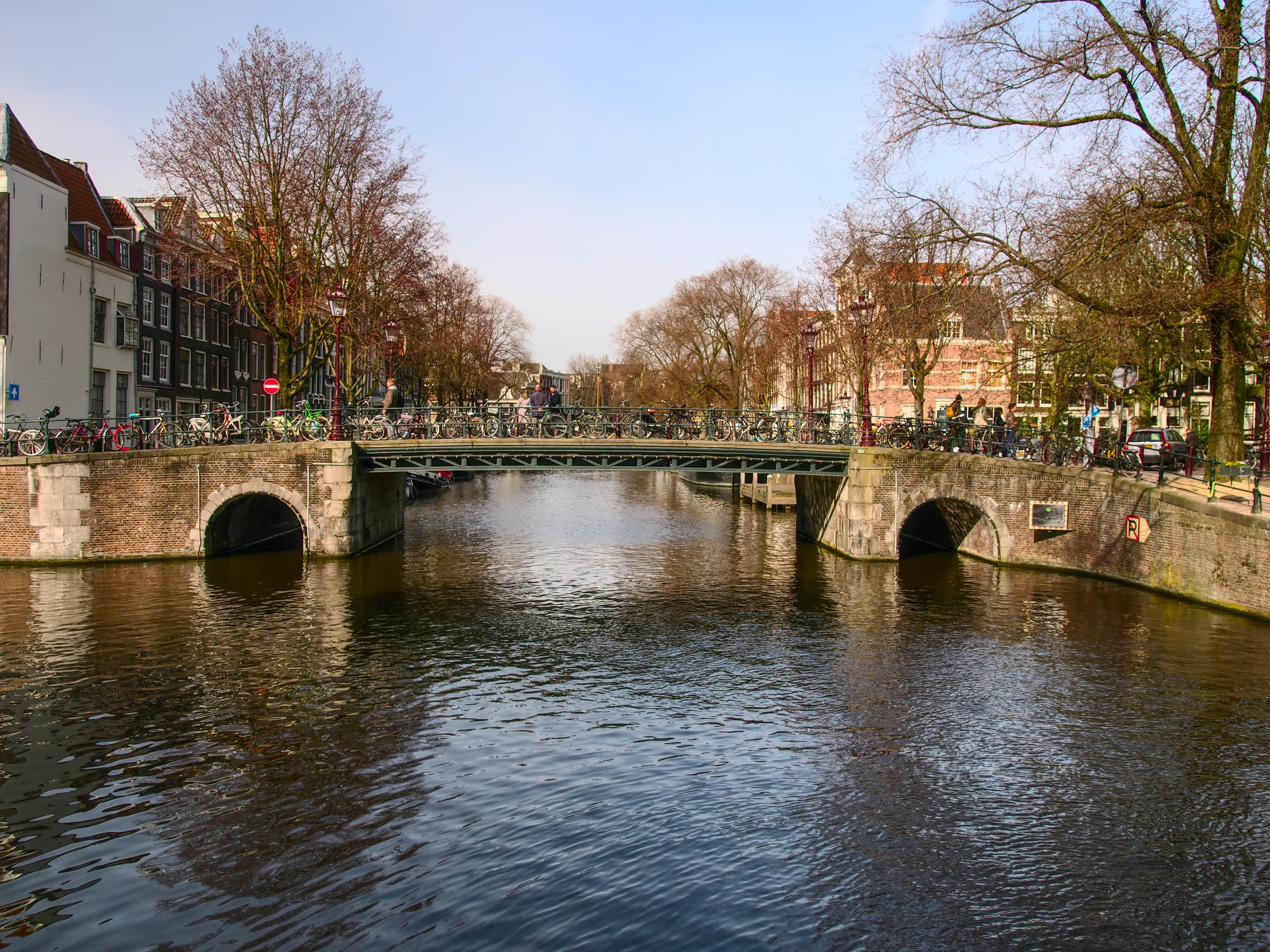
West Indian house bridge, bridge 17

The bridges over the Brouwersgracht are:

- Bridge 15, on the Singel.
- Bridge 16, Melkmeisjesbrug, pedestrian bridge between the Binnen Wieringerstraat and the Herengracht.
- Bridge 17, West-Indische huisbrug (West Indian house bridge) between Herenmarkt and Herengracht.
- Bridge 56, between the Binnen Brouwersstraat and the Keizersgracht.
- Bridge 57, Papiermolensluis (Paper Mill Lock), between the Korte Prinsengracht and the Prinsengracht.
- Bridge 146, Oranjebrug, iron lift bridge between the Binnen Oranjestraat and the Willemsstraat.
- Bridge 148, Dommersbrug, iron lift bridge between the Binnen Dommersstraat and the Palmgracht.
- Bridge 149, Bullebak bridge, corner of Marnixstraat.
- Bridge 55, Pastoors bridge, across the Keizersgracht.
- Bridge 59, Lekkeresluis, across the Prinsengracht.

== Famous residents ==
- Isaak de Graaf (1668–1743, cartographer)
- Angenis Hooft (1678–1734, philanthropist)
- Caspar Jacobsz Philips (1732–89, engraver)
- Siep van den Berg (1913–98, painter)
- Seth Gaaikema (1939–2014, comedian)
- Heini Otto (1954–, soccer player)
- Thomas Acda (1967–, musician and actor)
- Waldemar Torenstra (1974–, actor)
- Sophie Hilbrand (1975–, presenter)
- Katja Schuurman (1975–, actress)

== See also ==
- Canals of Amsterdam
