= Bois de Vincennes =

Public park in Paris

Coordinates: 48°49′41.05″N 2°25′58.50″E

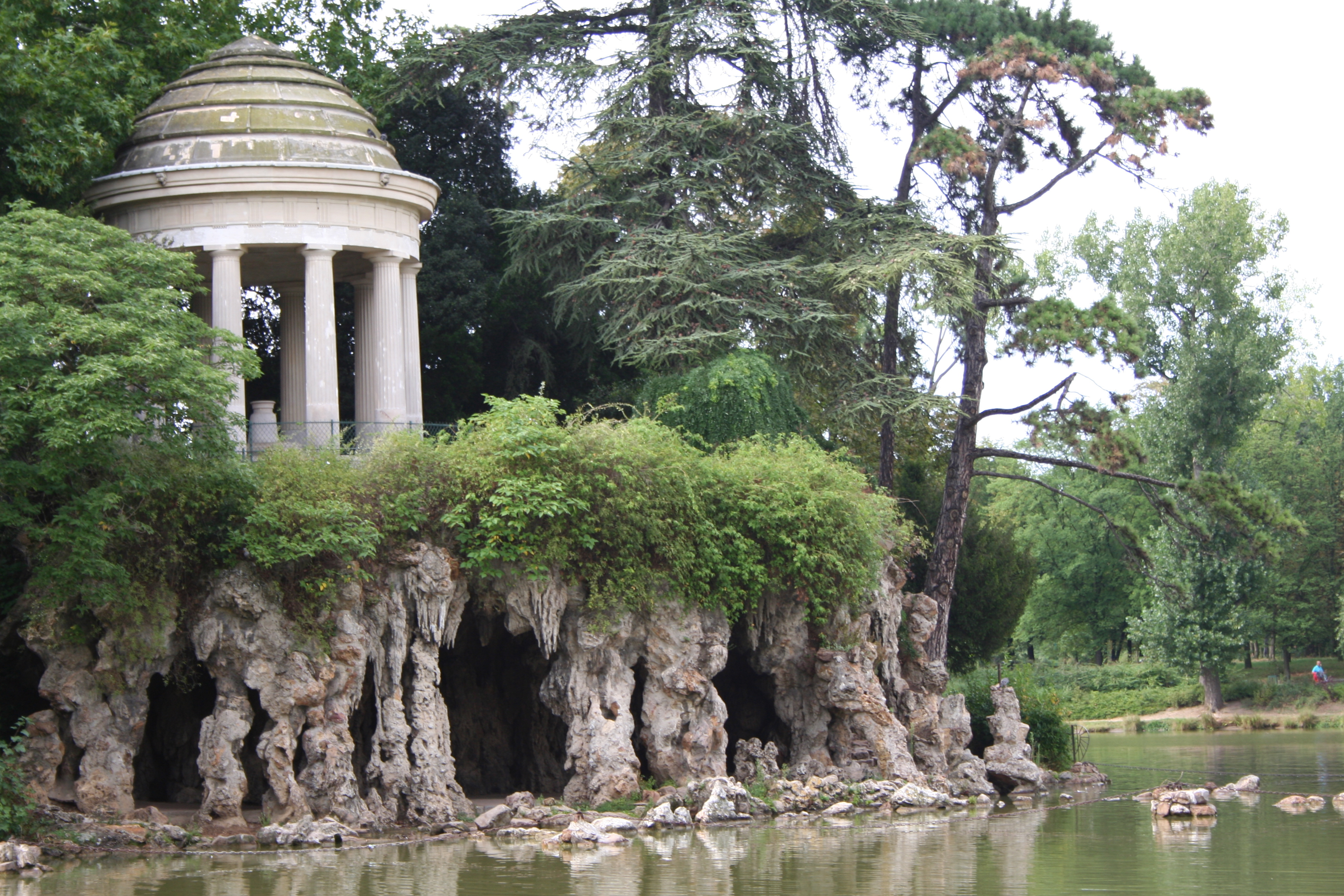
The Temple of Love on Lac Daumesnil in the Bois de Vincennes

The Bois de Vincennes (French pronunciation: [bwɑ d(ə) vɛ̃sɛn]), located on the eastern edge of Paris, France, is the largest public park in the city. It was created between 1855 and 1866 by Emperor Napoleon III.

The park is next to the Château de Vincennes, a former residence of the Kings of France. It contains an English landscape garden with four lakes; a zoo; an arboretum; a botanical garden; a hippodrome or horse-racing track; a velodrome for bicycle races; and the campus of the French national institute of sports and physical education. The park is known for prostitution after dark.

== Dimensions ==
The Bois de Vincennes, on the eastern edge of the city, is the largest park in Paris.

The Bois de Vincennes has a total area of 995 hectares (2,460 acres), making it slightly larger than the Bois de Boulogne 846 hectares (2,090 acres), the other great Parisian landscape park located at the western side of the city. It occupies ten percent of the total area of Paris, and is almost as large as the first six arrondissements in the center of the city combined. The Bois de Vincennes is about three times larger than Central Park in New York City (341 hectares / 843 acres), and is slightly larger than Richmond Park in London (955 hectares / 2,360 acres); but is smaller than Griffith Park in Los Angeles (1,170 hectares / 2891 acres). Only about half of the Bois de Vincennes is covered with trees.

== A royal hunting preserve ==
The Bois de Vincennes was part of the ancient forest that surrounded the ancient Roman town of Lutetia; at that time it was called Vilcena, the origin of the present name. In about 1150 King Louis VII (1137–1180) built a hunting lodge at the site of the present chateau. King Philippe-Auguste (1180–1223) enclosed the forest with a wall, stocked it with game, and began building a castle. King Louis IX, or Saint Louis (1226–1270) built a chapel next to the castle to house an important religious relic, which he believed to be the crown of thorns from the Crucifixion of Jesus. He was also famous for holding a royal court of justice under an oak near the chateau.

In 1336 King Philip VI of France (1293–1350) began construction of the imposing donjon of the Château de Vincennes. The work was continued by his successor, Jean II of France (1319–1364), and finished by Charles V of France (1338–1380), who surrounded the donjon with a rectangular wall flanked by nine towers. He also began to rebuild the chapel founded by Saint Louis. The new chapel was called La-Sainte Chapelle, modeled after the Saint-Chapelle in the Palais de la Cité in Paris. It was not finished until the 16th century. A hunting party in the forest is shown as the December scene in the Très Riches Heures du Duc de Berry (1412–1416), with the towers of the chateau visible in the background. The forest was also the home of a community of monks of the order of the Minimes; their presence is remembered by the name of the Lac des Minimes within the park.

In 1654 Cardinal Mazarin commissioned the royal architect Louis Le Vau to build a new palace for King Louis XIV next to the chateau. The new palace featured a pavilion for the King and another for the Queen, separated by a portico and by a wall connected by arcades to the medieval section of the chateau. The donjon had been transformed into prison in the 15th century. The palace was popular with the King for a time, but once Louis XIV established his residence at Versailles, the château of Vincennes was rarely used.

In the 18th century Louis XV (1710–1774) opened the park to the public, excepting servants in livery. He had hundreds of trees planted and laid out long straight alleys through the forest in the form of intersecting stars. In 1731 he constructed a pyramid-shaped monument to mark the meeting point of the two main alleys, which can still be seen.

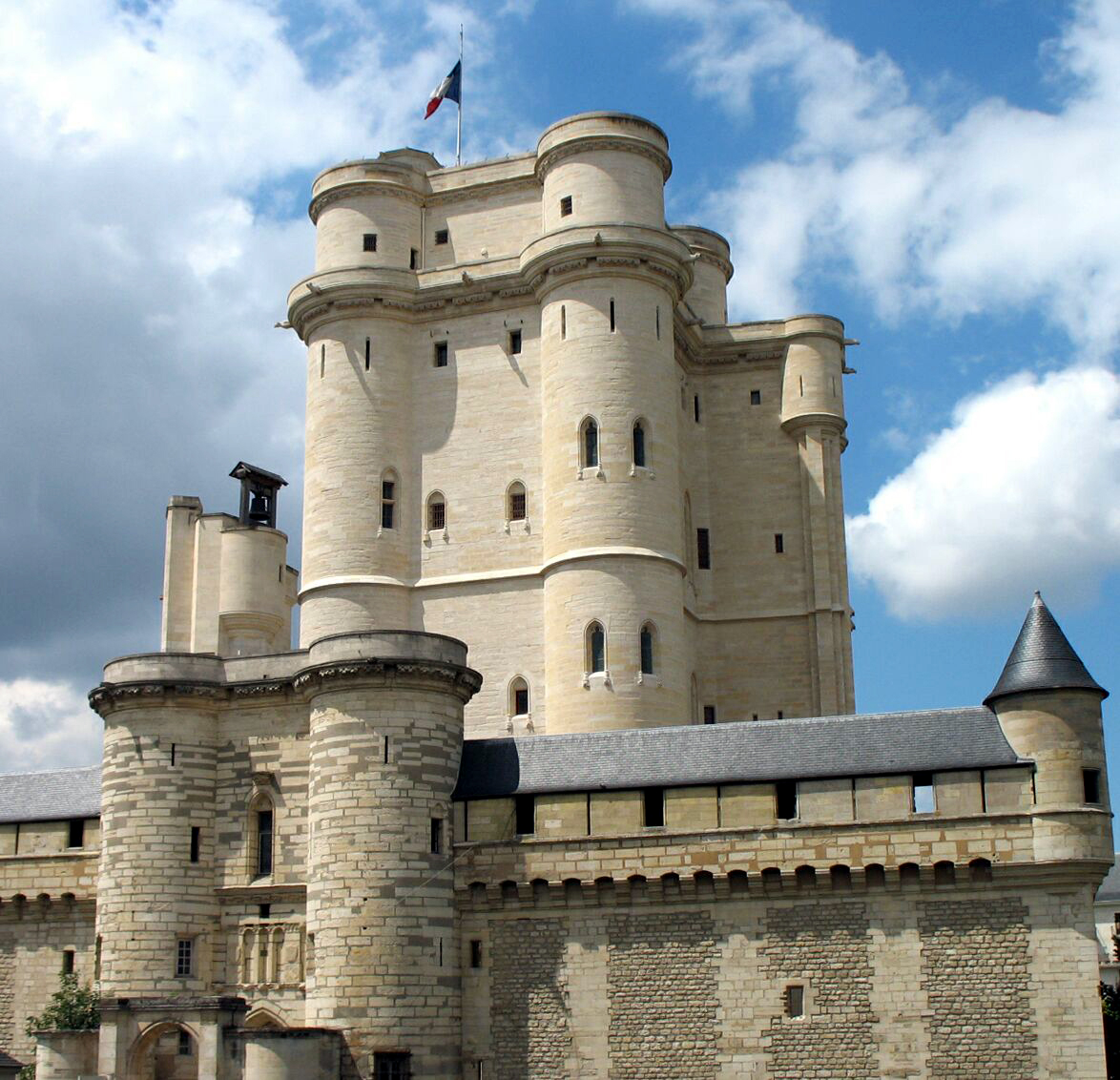
The 14th-century donjon of the Château de Vincennes, a former royal residence and then a prison, is now open to public.

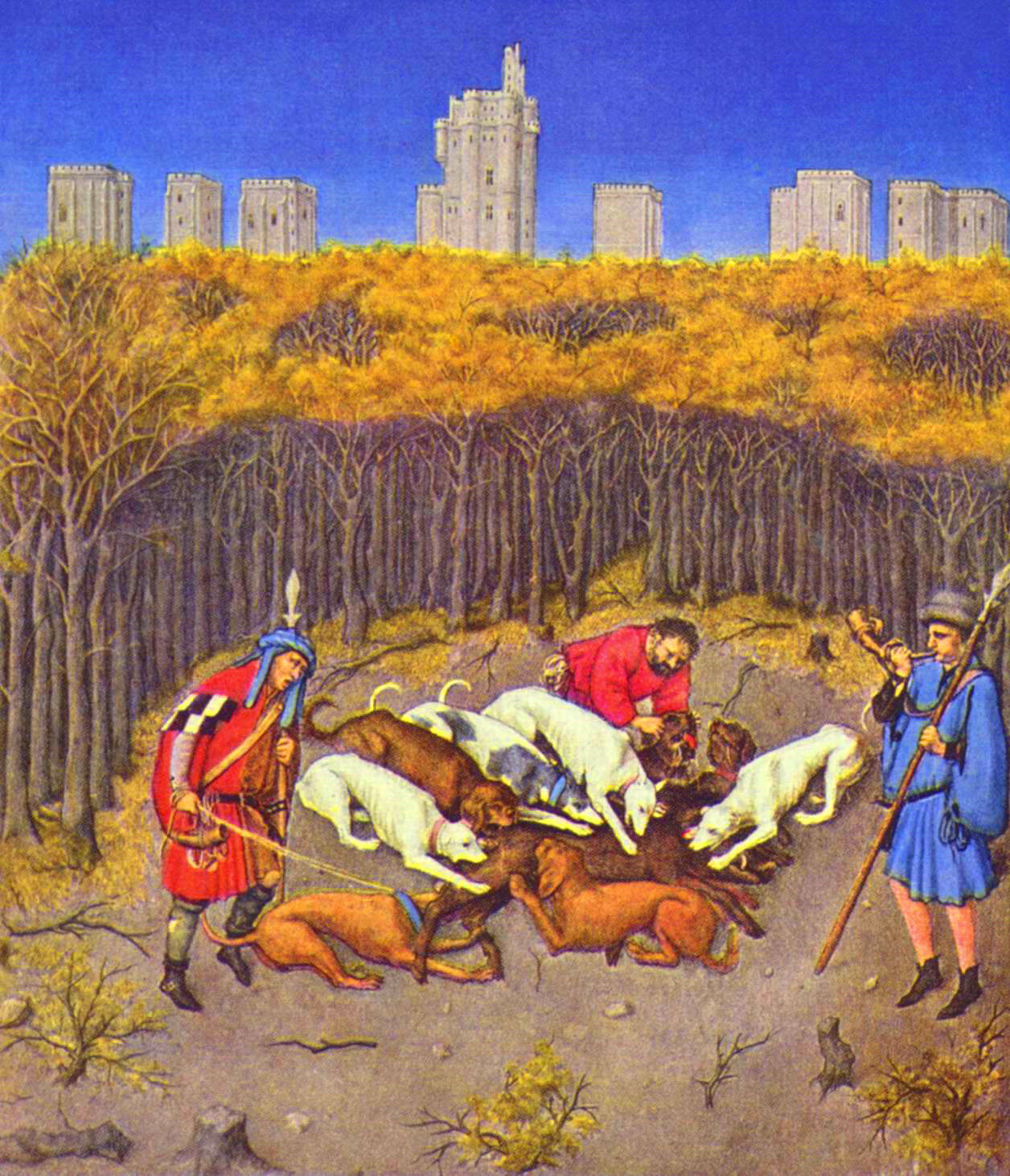
A hunting party in the Bois de Vincennes in the 15th century, from the Très Riches Heures du duc de Berry. The towers of the chateau are visible in the background.

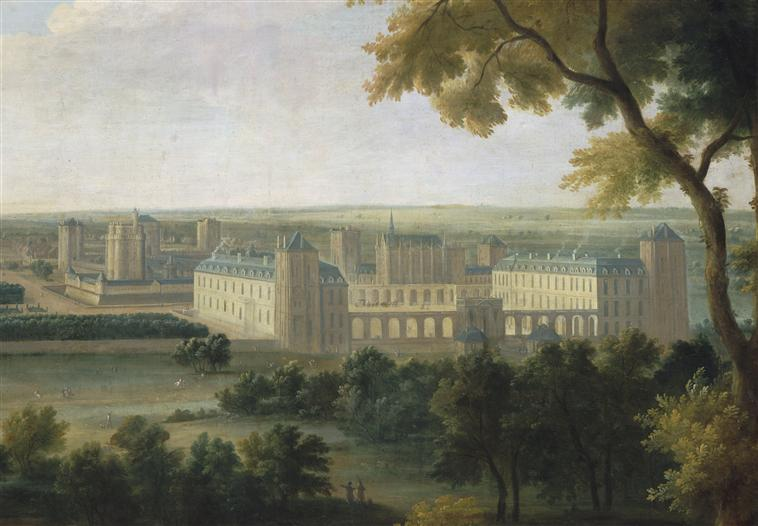
The Château de Vincennes and its park in 1724.

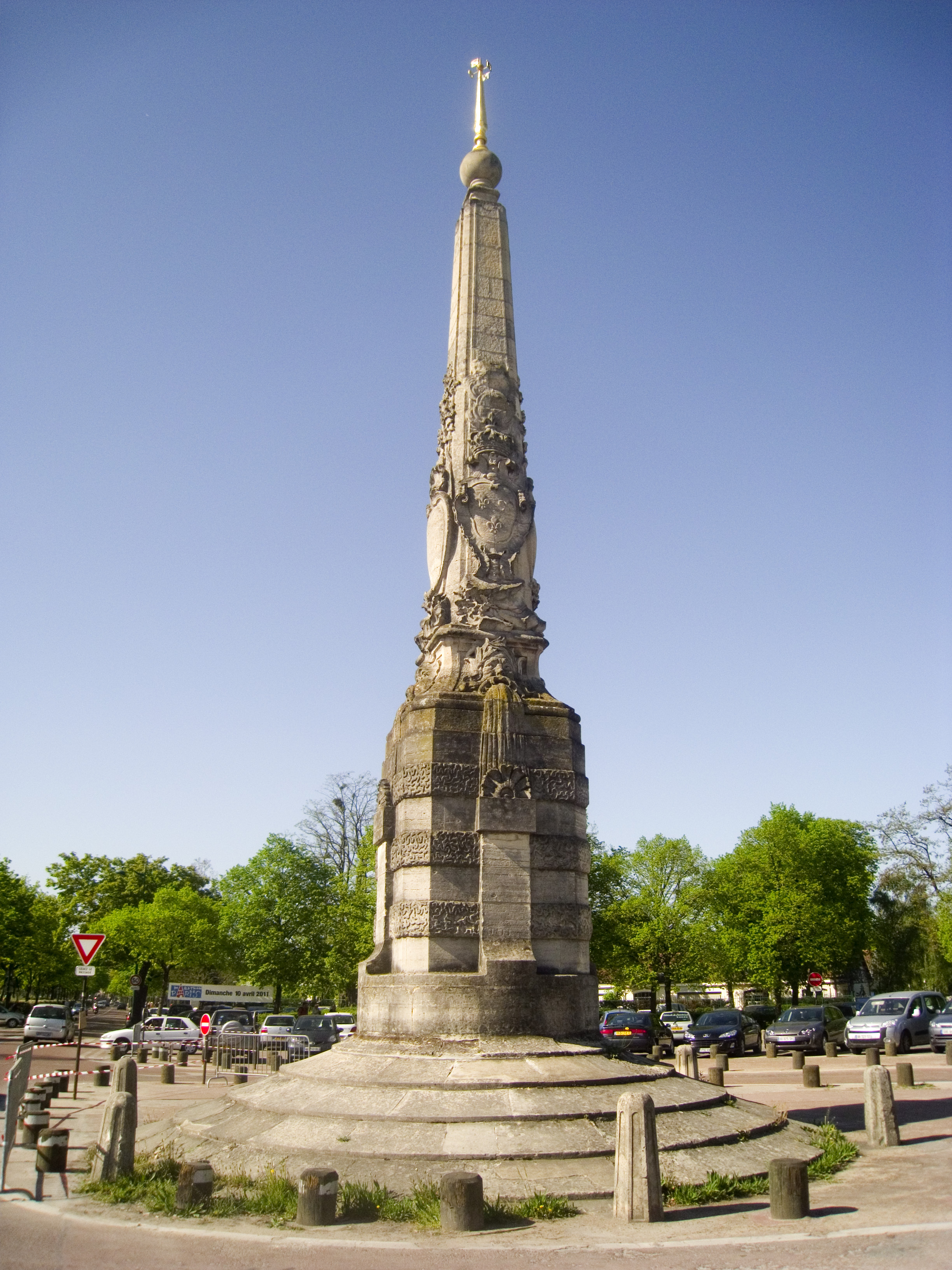
The pyramid of the Bois de Vincennes, built by King Louis XV in 1731. He opened the park to the public.

== The creation of the park ==
Beginning in 1794, large parts of the Bois de Vincennes were turned into a military training ground. Some of the structures of the old chateau were demolished, and a firing range was built. In 1840–43, a new fort was constructed in the park east of the chateau, and a 166 hectare section of the park was cleared and used for military parades and exercises.

In 1854 the Emperor Louis Napoleon, and his new Prefect of the Seine, Georges-Eugène Haussmann, decided to transform the Bois de Vincennes into a public park. Haussmann had three major projects for Paris; to improve the traffic circulation of the city, for both practical and military reasons; to build a new system to distribute water and take away sewage; and to create a network of parks and gardens all over the city. The purpose of the park was to provide green space and recreation to the large working-class population of eastern Paris, similar to the Bois de Boulogne, which Louis Napoleon had begun building in 1852 for the more affluent population of the west side of Paris.

To build the parks, in 1855 Haussmann created a new Service of Promenades and Plantations, led by an engineer, Jean-Charles Adolphe Alphand, who was already at work on the Bois de Boulogne. Alphand was a master organizer, the builder of the most famous Paris parks of the 19th century; besides the Bois de Boulogne and Bois de Vincennes, he built the gardens of the Champs-Élysées, the boulevard of the Paris Observatory, Parc Monceau and the Parc des Buttes Chaumont.

Alphand stated his philosophy of gardens very clearly in his memoir Les Promenades de Paris: "When we say that a garden should preserve a natural appearance, we don't mean that it should be an exact copy of the nature which is around us. A garden is a work of art." While nature and the site gave the general lines, the art consisted of the "combinations of forms, colors, and light." Alphand carefully composed his picturesque landscapes out of lawns, groves of trees, flower beds, streams and lakes, visited by taking winding paths.

Alphand's task was made much more difficult by the nature of the site. In the center of the park was an enormous military training field, completely cleared of trees. Around the base were firing ranges, a factory for making ammunition, and several forts and redoubts, which occupied large tracts of land. Even after the park was created, the Army continued to build; A new military shooting range was opened in 1860, and a school of pyrotechnics was built in 1864.

Alphand solved the problem by annexing addition sections of land at the edges of the park, and by creating three smaller parks around the Bois, each with its own artificial lake and picturesque landscape. Lake Daumesnil, designed like a romantic landscape painting, had two islands, and sloping green lawns. The Lac des Minimes to the north included some of the ruins of the original medieval monastery that once stood there; and the Lac de Saint-Mandė in the northwest completed the park. A fourth lake, the Lac de Gravelle in the south-east, was higher in elevation than the others, on the Plateau de Gravelle, and therefore provided water to the other lakes through artificial streams. Trees, lawns and flower beds were planted by Jean-Pierre Barillet-Deschamps, the chief horticulturist of the city, who had landscaped the Bois de Boulogne.

Alphand saw that the park had popular attractions and concessions to attract visitors and to help pay for the park. A large hippodrome, or horse-racing track, was built in the southeastern corner of the park, similar to the Longchamps hippodrome at the Bois de Boulogne. There were cafe-restaurants at the different lakes. The park was also decorated with picturesque architecture, mostly designed by Gabriel Davioud, the city architect. His works included the grandstands of the hippodrome and the Temple of Love, a round doric temple which was placed on a promontory on the Isle de Reuilly in Lac Daumesnil, above an artificial grotto. On the same island was a Swiss chalet (taken from the Paris Universal Exposition of 1867), a cafe, a bandstand, and buildings for vendors and game concessions. A swinging suspension bridge connected the two islands in the lake.

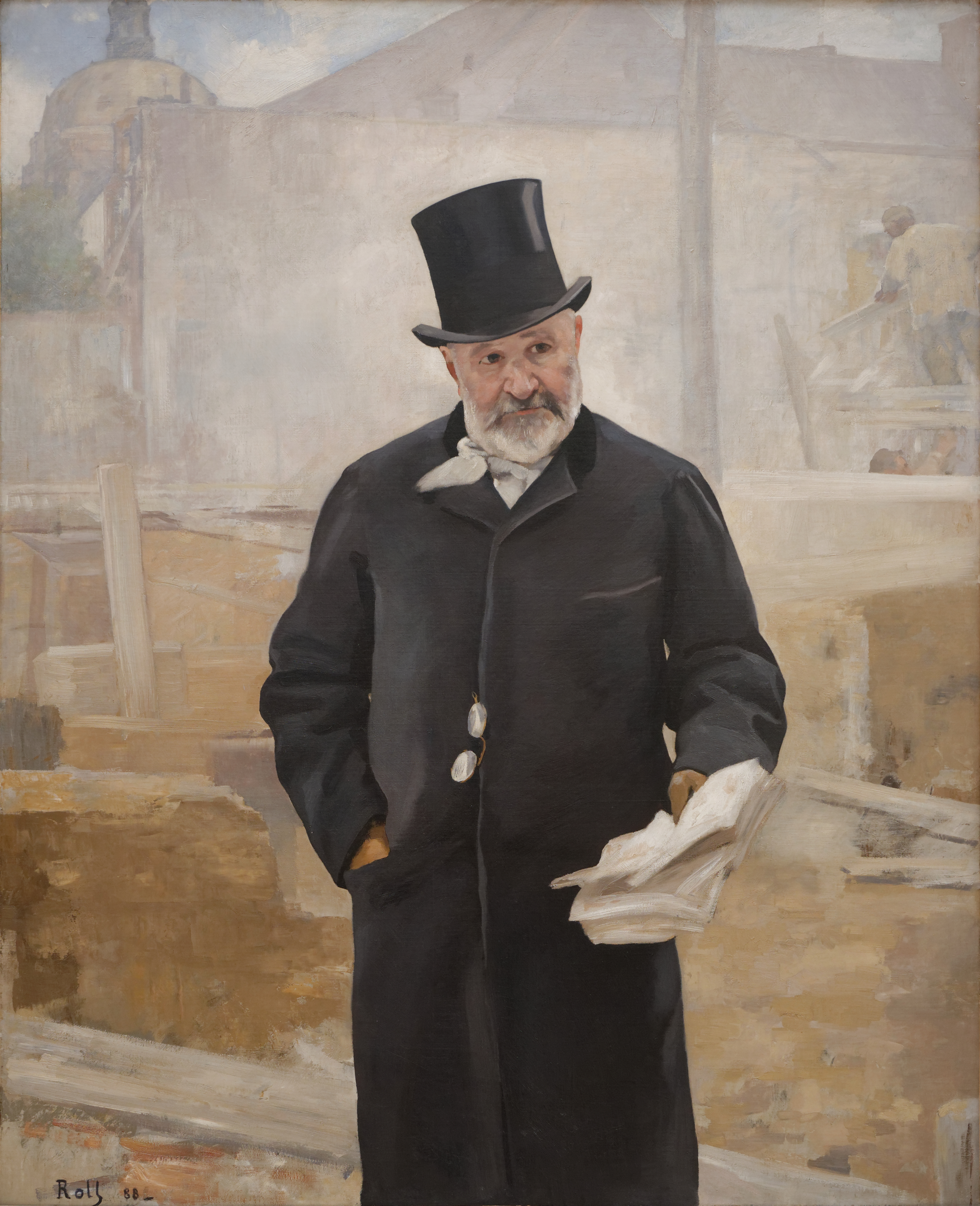
Jean-Charles Adolphe Alphand, the builder of the Bois de Vincennes, the Bois de Boulogne, and many of the other great parks of Paris.

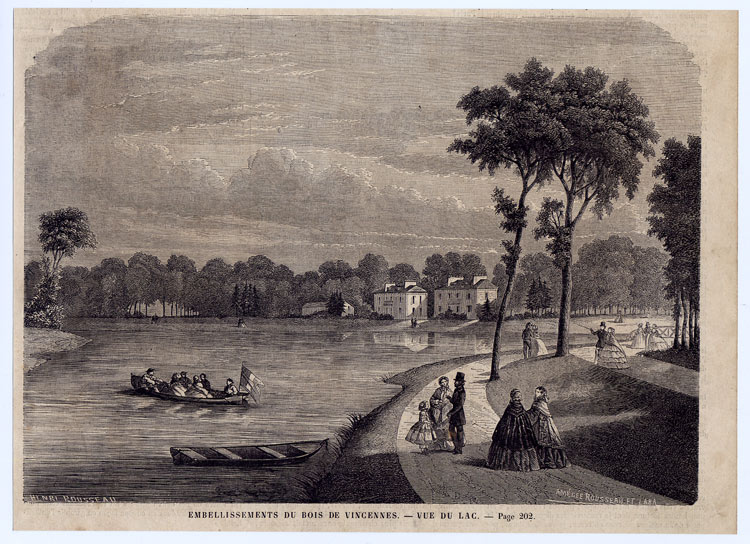
The Lac des Minimes in 1860.

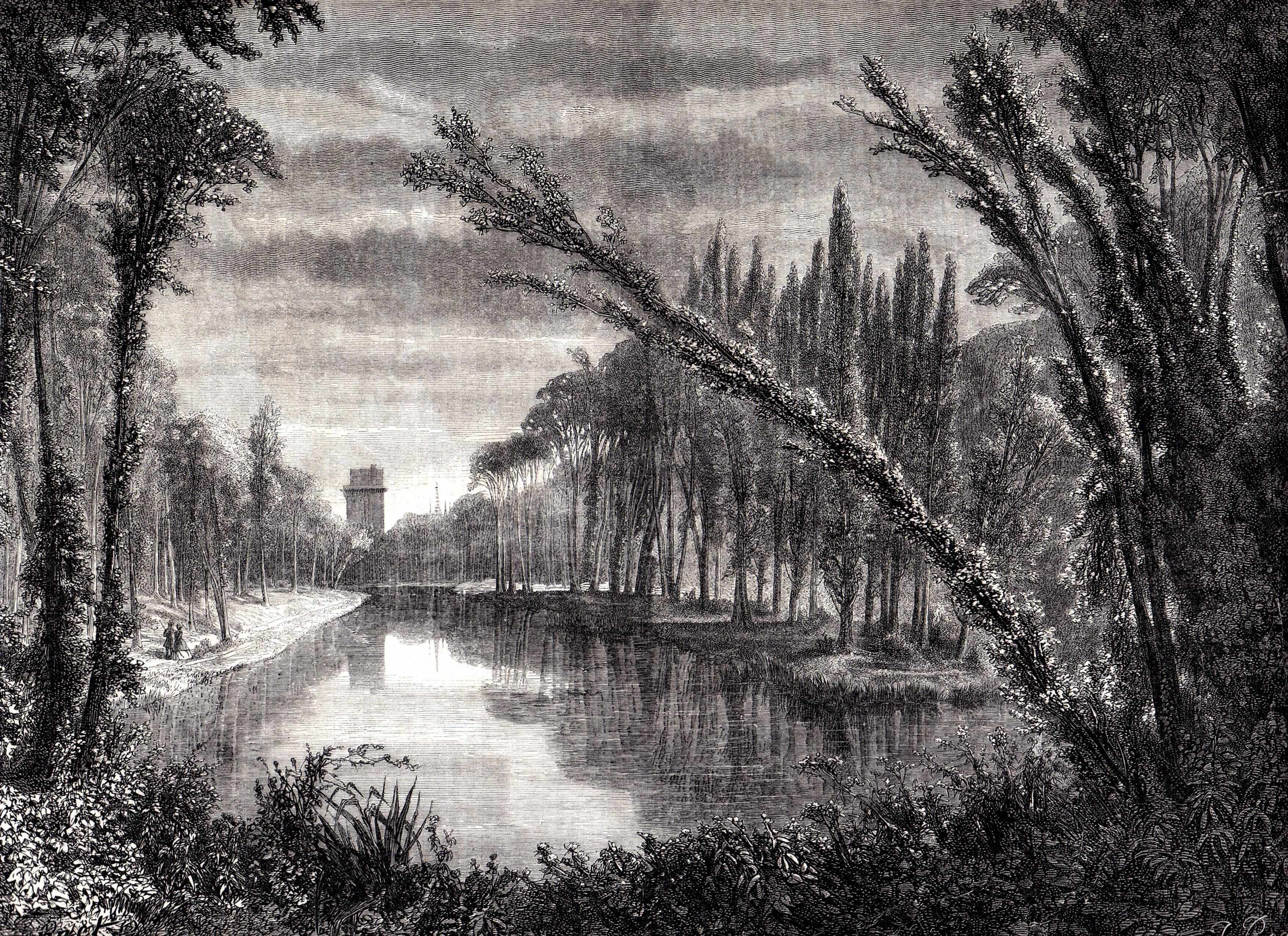
The Lac de Saint-Mandé in 1860.

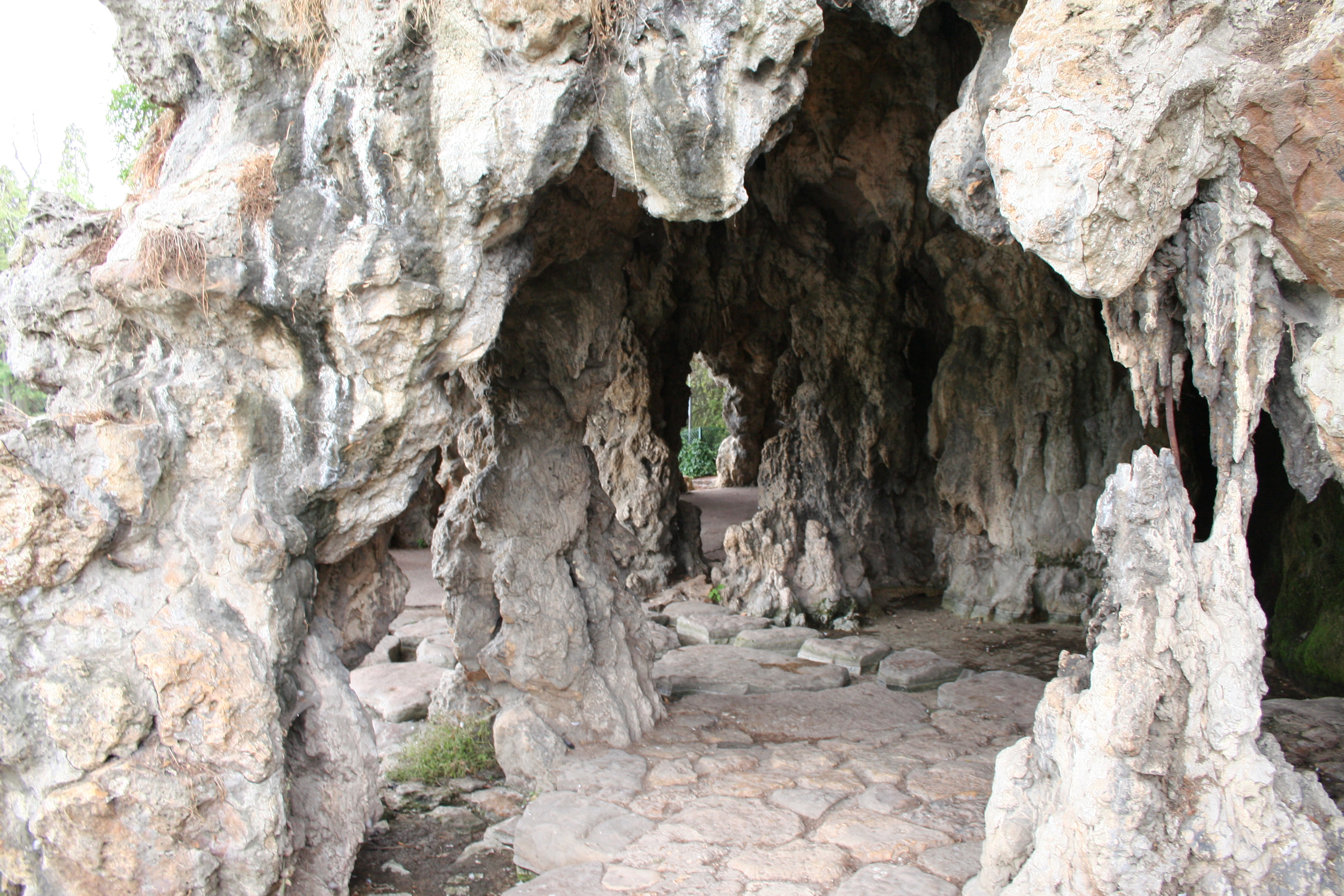
The artificial grotto on the Isle de Reuilly.

== The park in the 19th and 20th century ==
In 1899, an experimental tropical garden had been established in the far eastern end of the park, where rubber trees, coffee trees, banana trees and other tropical plants were scientifically studied. In 1907, this garden became the site of the first Colonial Exposition held in Paris, designed to showcase the cultures and products of the French colonies. The exposition featured six villages, complete with inhabitants, from the different parts of the French Empire; an emcampment of Tuaregs from North Africa; a farm from Sudan; a village of Kanaks from New Caledonia; and villages from Madagascar, French Indochina, and the Congo. The Exposition was seen by two million visitors.

At the 1900 Summer Olympics in Paris, most of events took place in the Bois de Vincennes. The Velodrome, which seats forty thousand spectators, was built for the cycling events. The park hosted the first international cricket match between England and France; England unsurprisingly won.

During the First World War, the Dutch spy Mata Hari was imprisoned in the fortress of Vincennes and executed by firing squad in the moat of the fortress on 15 October 1917. Eyewitnesses reported that her hands were not bound, and that she refused a blindfold. According to the legend (not documented), she is said to have blown a kiss at the firing squad, and to have said, "What a strange custom you French have, to shoot people at dawn."

In 1929, the Bois de Vincennes was officially annexed to the city of Paris and included in the city's 12th arrondissement, similar to the Bois de Boulogne which was attached to its 16th arrondissement.

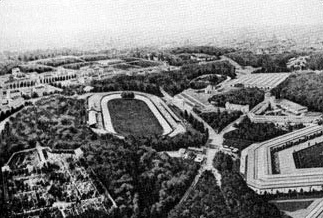
The velodrome of Vincennes in 1900. It can seat 40,000 spectators, and was the site of the cycling events at the Olympic Games of 1900 and 1924.

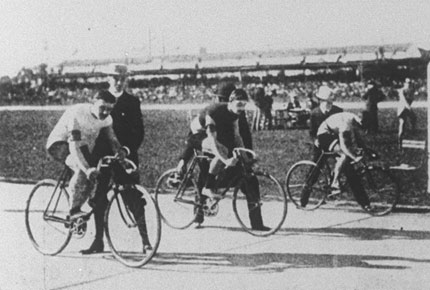
The cycling sprint event at the 1900 Olympic Games in the Bois de Vincennes.

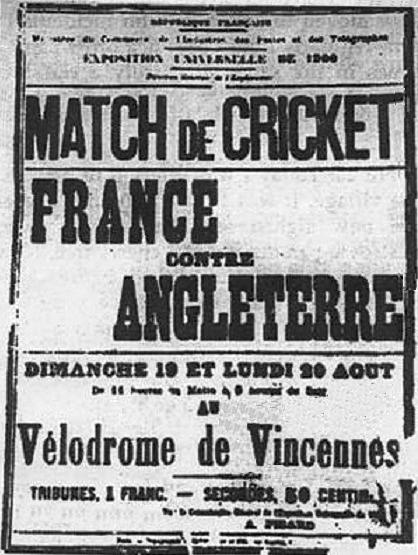
Poster for the first France-England cricket match held in 1900 in the Bois de Vincennes.

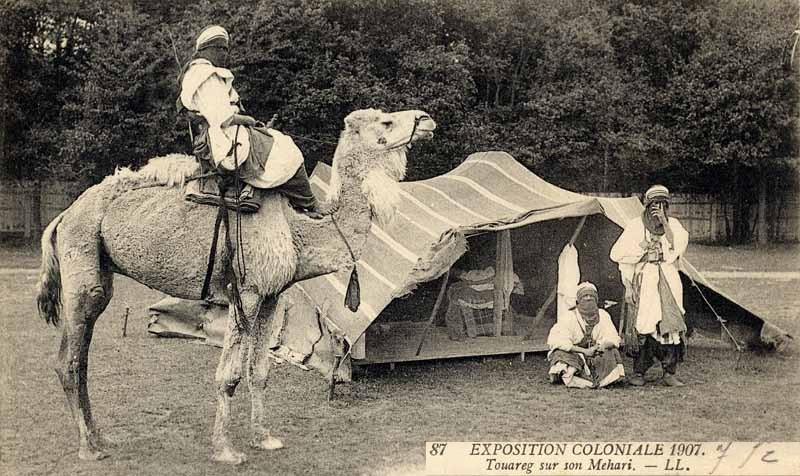
The Tuareg camp, complete with real Tuaregs, was a popular feature of the 1907 Colonial Exposition.

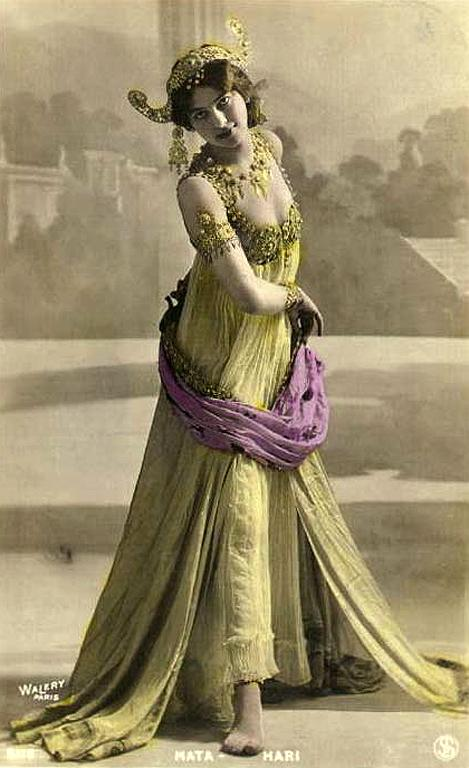
The convicted spy Mata Hari was executed in the moat of the fortress of Vincennes at dawn on 15 October 1917.

=== The 1931 Paris Colonial Exposition ===
For six months in 1931, the Paris Colonial Exposition took place in the Bois de Vincennes. Like the earlier 1907 exposition, It was designed to showcase the culture, products and resources of the French empire, but it was much larger. It occupied the side of the park along the length of the Avenue Daumesnil. The features of the exhibit included the Palace of the Colonies. In front of the palace was a large gilded bronze statue by Leon Drivier entitled France bringing peace and prosperity to the colonies. It had pavilions from each colony and from other nations, cafes and theaters, a Senegalese village complete with inhabitants, and a zoo.

The exposition featured eight spectacular fountains, fed with water from Lake Daumesnil. The Grand Signal was a centerpiece of the exposition, a tower forty-five meters high, which spouted water from the top and from jets at nineteen different levels. Two other fountains created a bridge of water forty meters long between the two islands in the lake. A third fountain, called the Theater of Water, was an arc of towers and spouts eighty meters long, which in evening performances produced cascades, jets and curtains of water colored with electric lights. These were early ancestors of today's musical fountains in Dubai and Las Vegas.

Several vestiges of the fair can still be seen. The entrance gate is still standing. After the Fair closed, the Palace of the Colonies became the Museum of the Arts of Africa and the Oceania. In 1934 the zoo was moved to its present location, and embellished with a sixty-five meter high artificial mountain, which became the home of a collection of mountain goats and sheep. The pavilion of Cameroon was preserved and turned into a Buddhist temple and religious center.

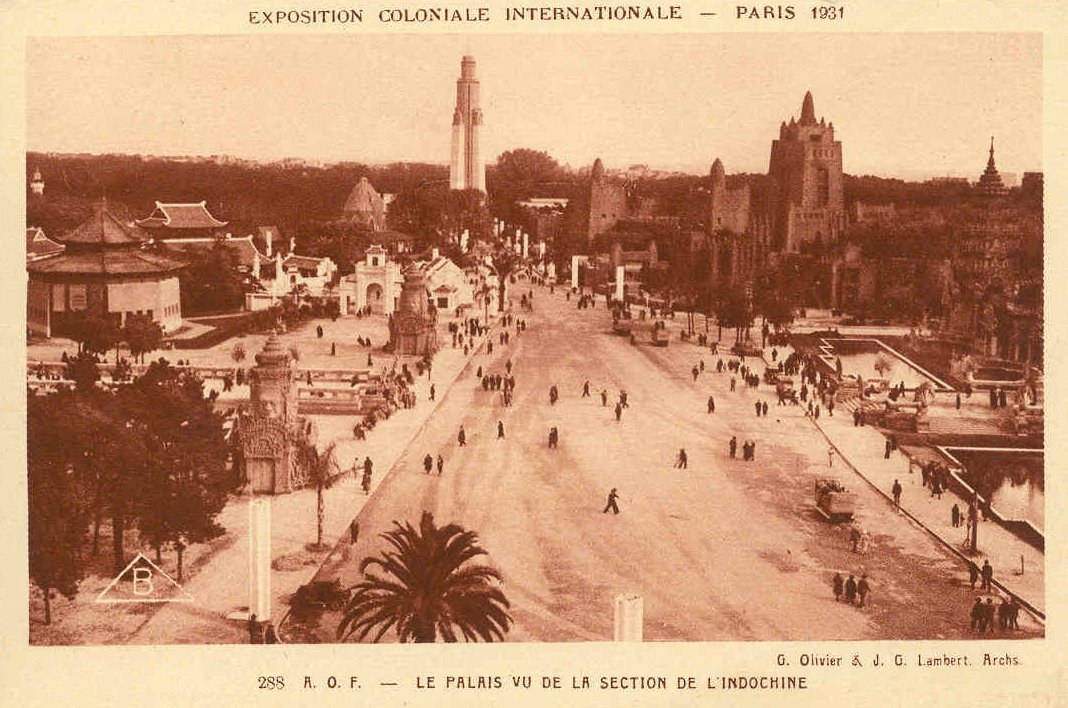
The main boulevard of the Paris Colonial Exposition.

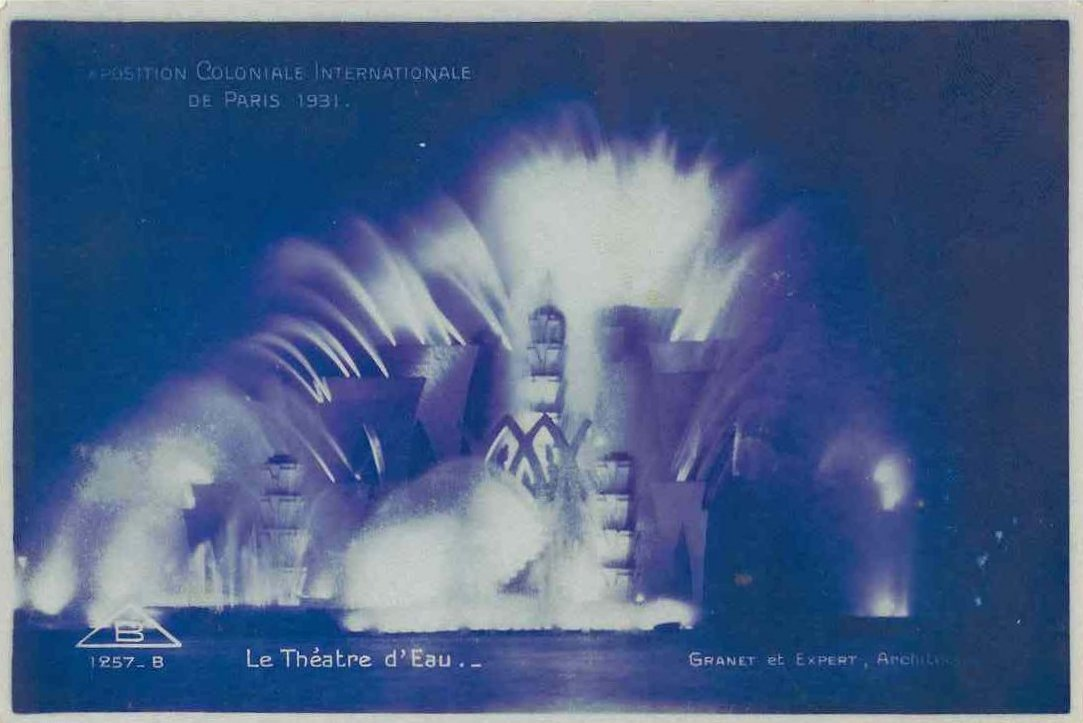
The Theater of water in Lac Daumesnil during the Paris Colonial Exposition.

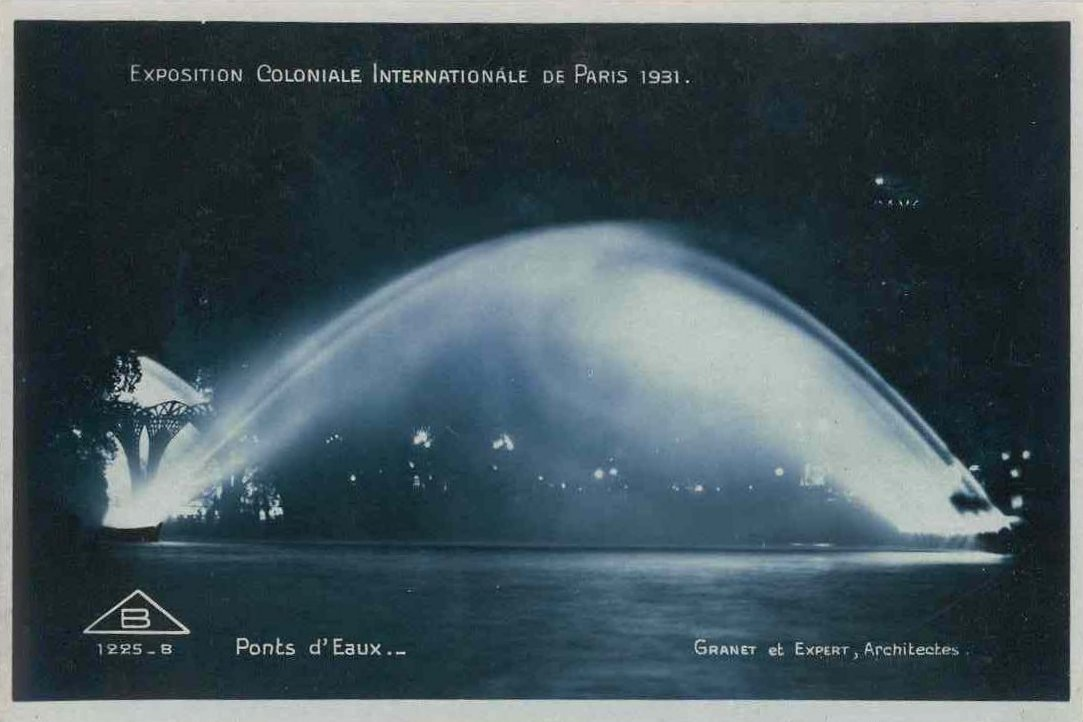
The bridge of water that connected the two islands in Lac Daumesnil during the Colonial Exposition.

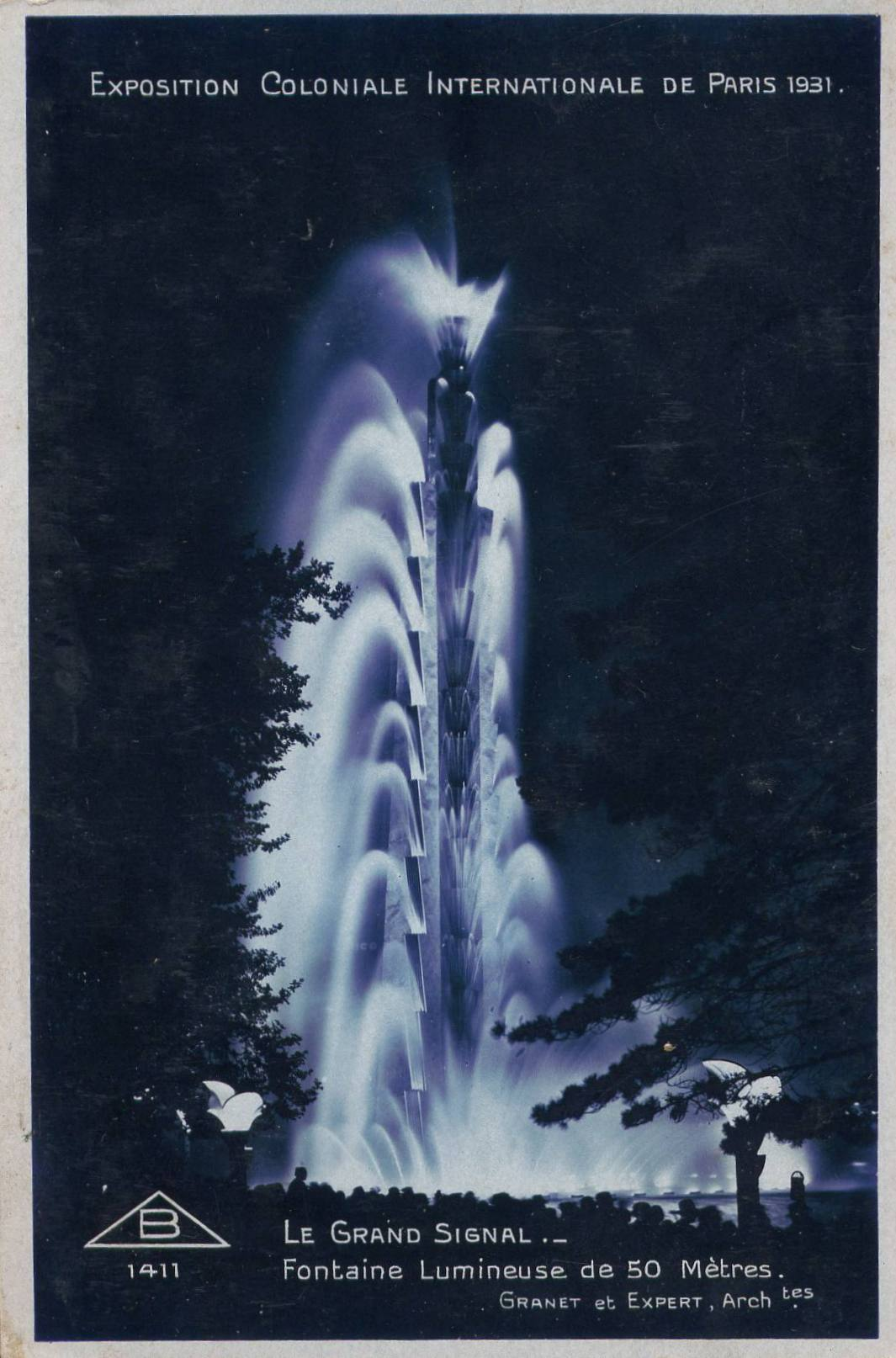
The Grand Signal fountain, 45 meters high, was the central feature of the 1931 Paris Colonial Exposition.

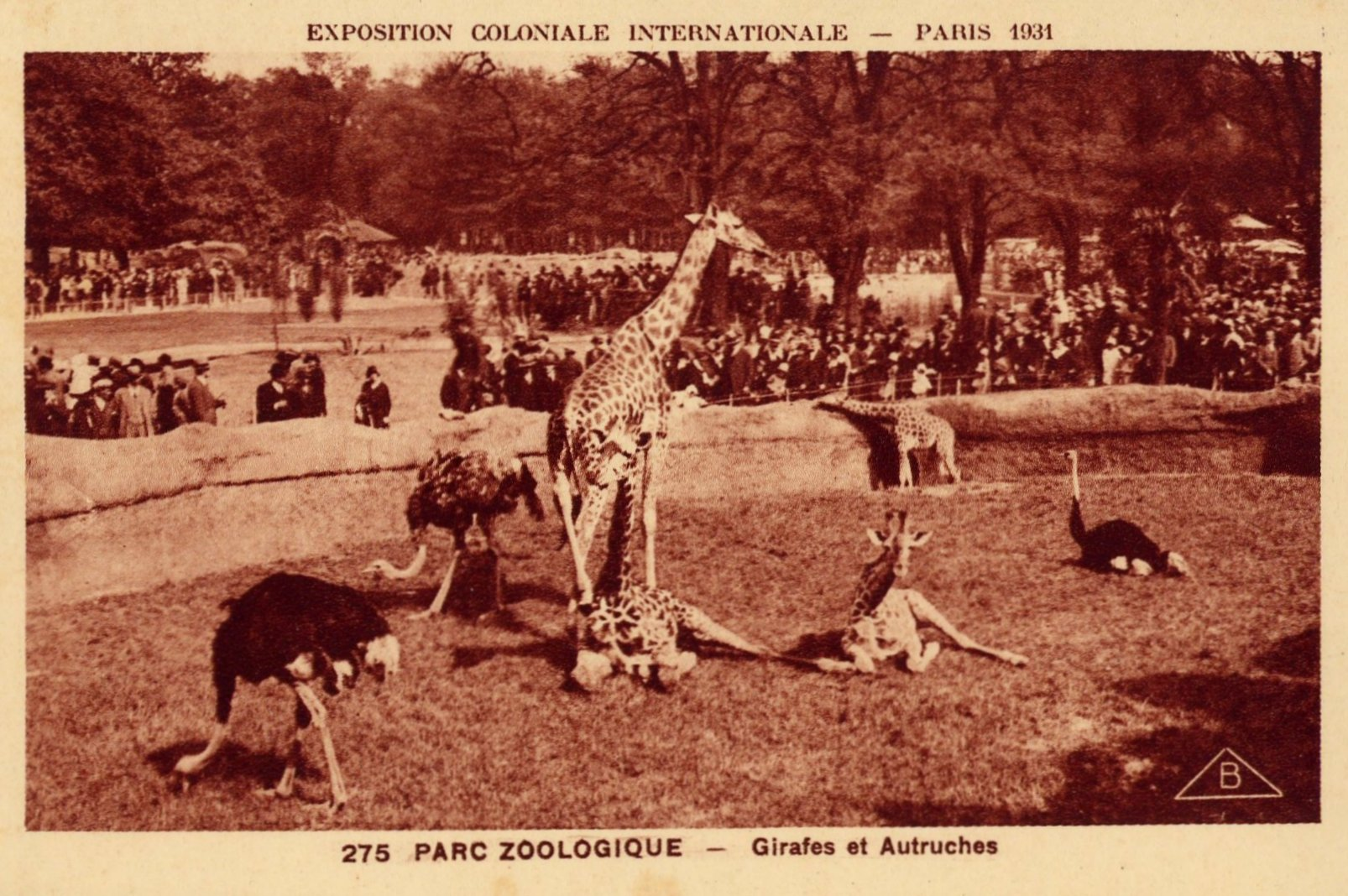
The zoo of the 1931 Exposition, expanded in 1934 into the modern zoological park of Vincennes

During the Battle of France in 1940, the Chateau was the headquarters of the French General Staff. It was heavily damaged and not fully restored until the 1990s. At the end of World War II in 1945, the French army began to move out of the Bois de Vincennes.

== Features of the Bois de Vincennes ==
Bois de Vincennes

=== Lakes ===
The Bois de Vincennes is home to four artificial lakes. The water for the lakes was originally pumped from the Marne River, but today comes from a pumping station near the Pont d'Austerlitz on the Seine.

- Lac Daumesnil (12 hectares), is located in the western end of the park, and has two islands. Its attractions include the Temple d'Amour and the Swiss Chalet on the Isle de Reuilly, and an artificial grotto.
- Lac des Minimes (6 hectares), in the north-east, has three small islands. Its length is 500 meters and its width is 200 meters. Its attractions include the vestiges of a medieval monastery.
- Lac de Saint-Mandé, in the northwest.
- Lac de Gravelle (1 hectare), in the south-east, is the smallest lake in the park. At a higher elevation than the other lakes, it provides water to the other lakes through an artificial stream.
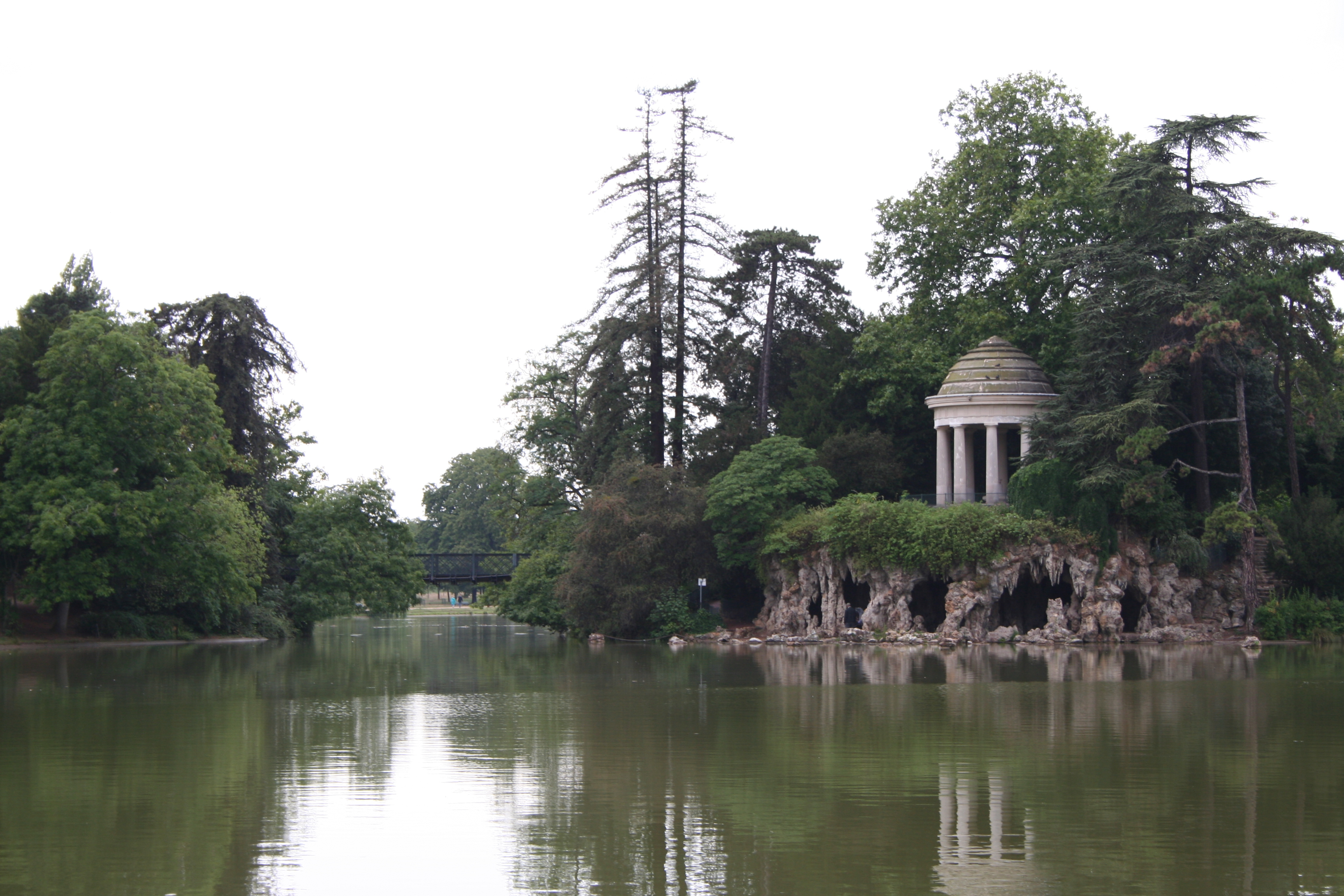
The two islands in Lac Daumesnil are connected by a suspension bridge, and are accessible by boat.

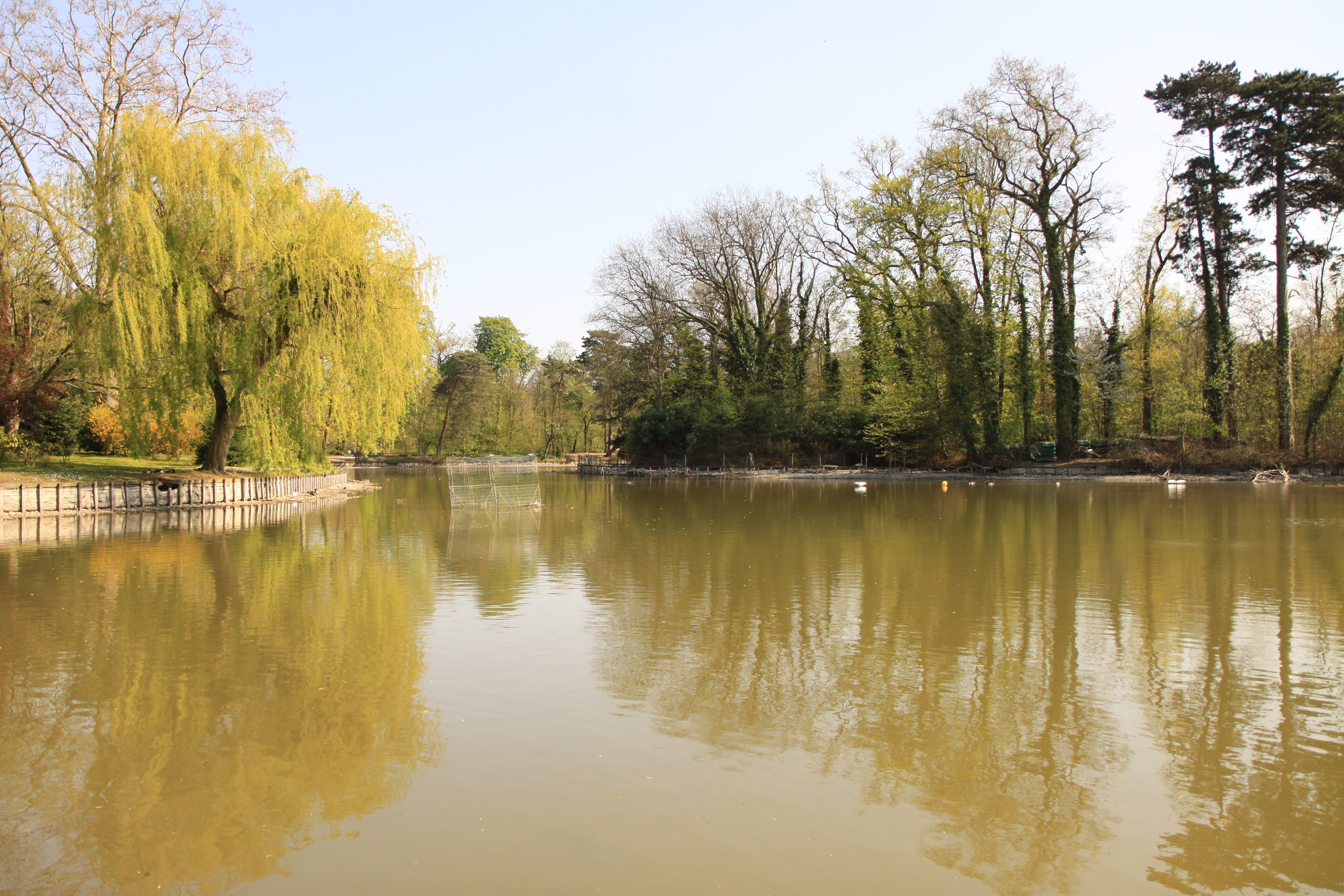
The Lac des Minimes was the former site of a medieval monastery.

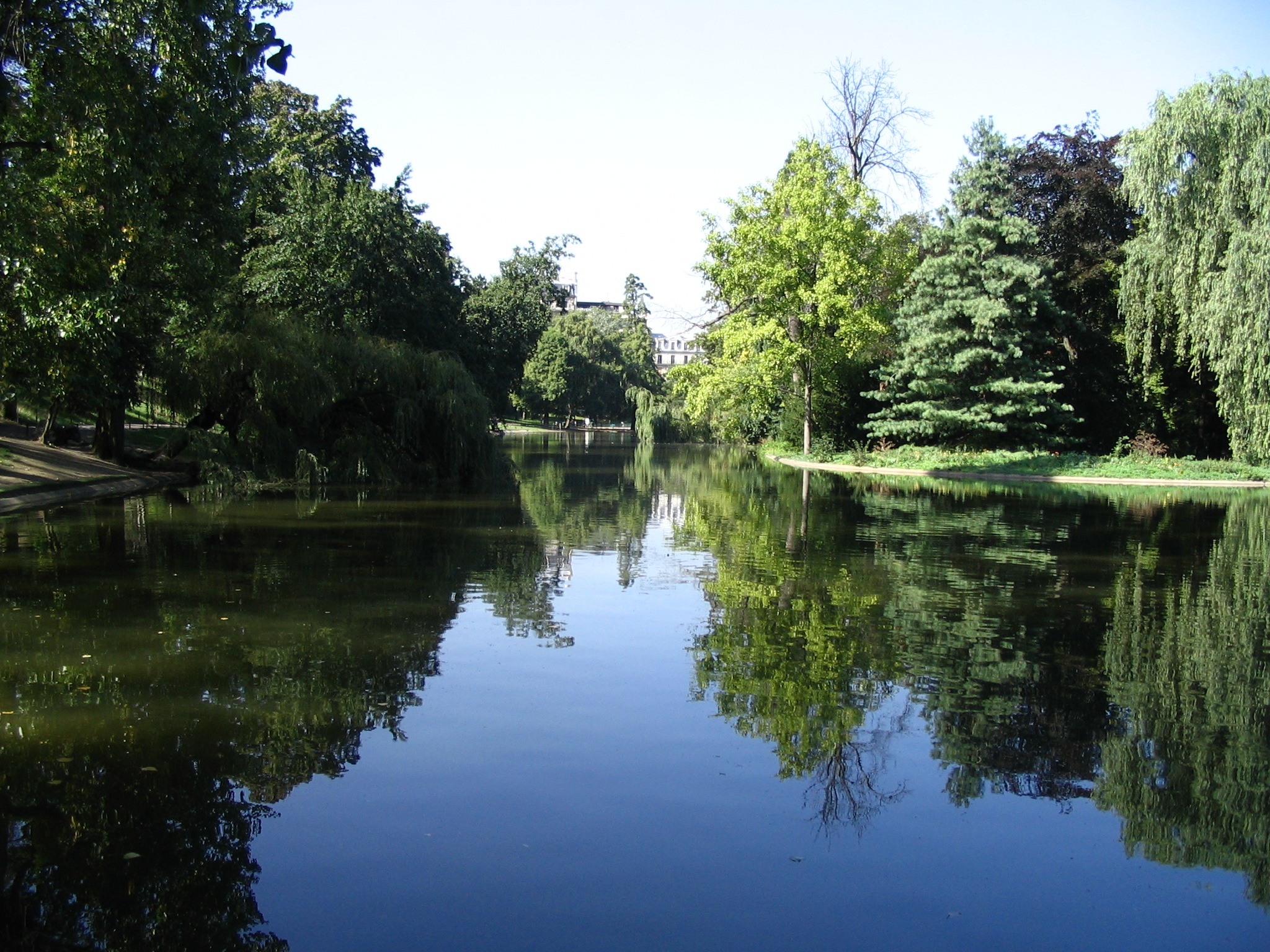
Lac Saint-Mandé

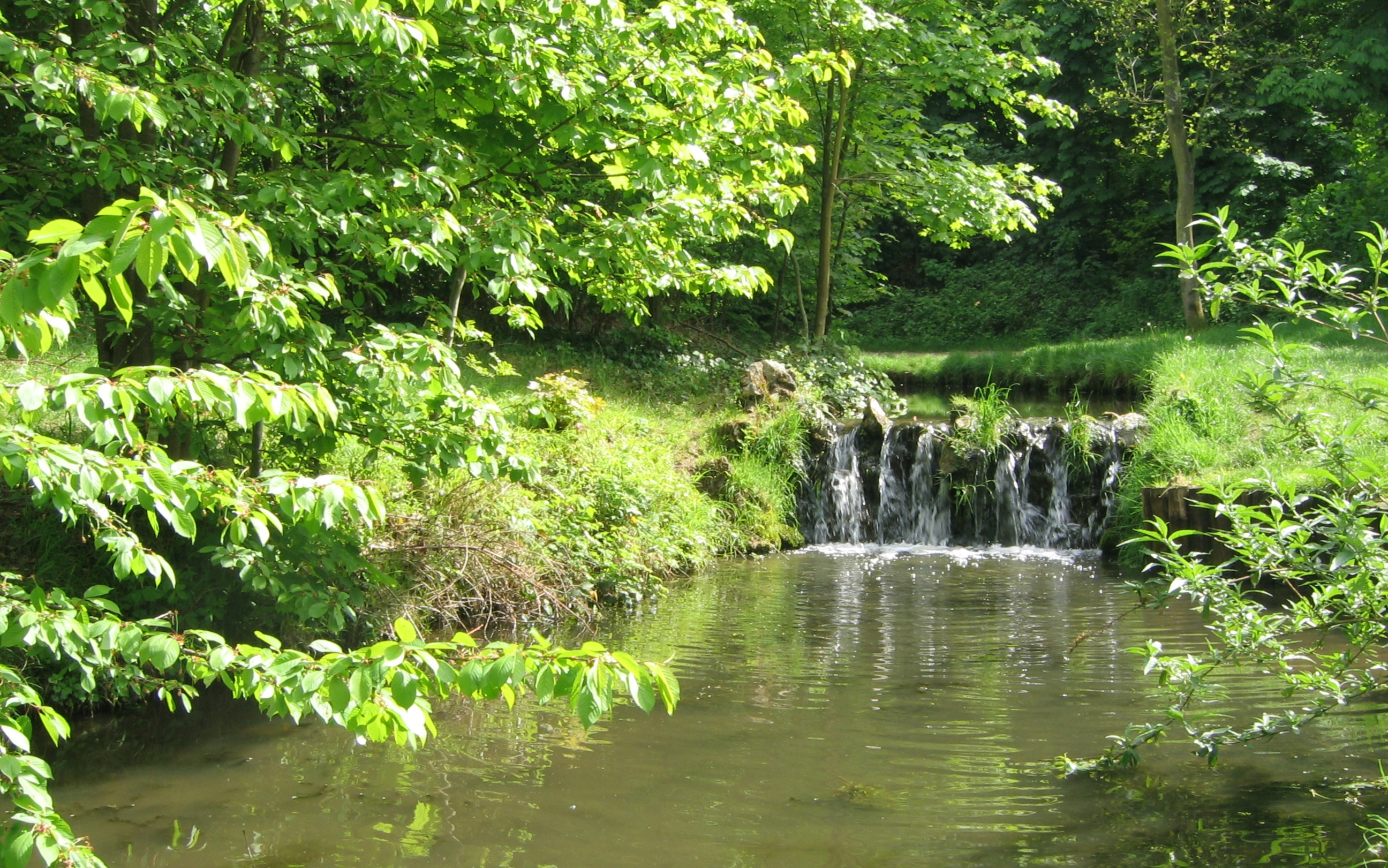
An artificial stream feeds water from the Lac de Gravelle to the other lakes in the park.

=== Gardens ===
- The Parc floral de Paris, or Paris floral park, was established in 1969 on the former military training grounds in the park. It occupies 31 hectares, and is the largest garden built in Paris since the French Empire of Louis Napoleon. It is one of the four parts of the Botanical Garden of Paris, the others being the gardens of the Château de Bagatelle in the Bois de Boulogne; the Jardin des Serres d'Auteuil or greenhouses of Auteuil, and the Arboretum de l'École du Breuil, located in another part of Bois de Vincennes. The Japanese architecture within the garden was inspired by the 1964 Tokyo Olympics. The garden features hundreds of varieties of flowers, including 650 varieties of iris; twenty-pavilions and an exhibit hall; a sculpture garden with works of Alexander Calder, Alberto Giacometti and other international artists; a monumental fountain created by Francois Stahly; and an avenue of pines preserved from the early days of the park.
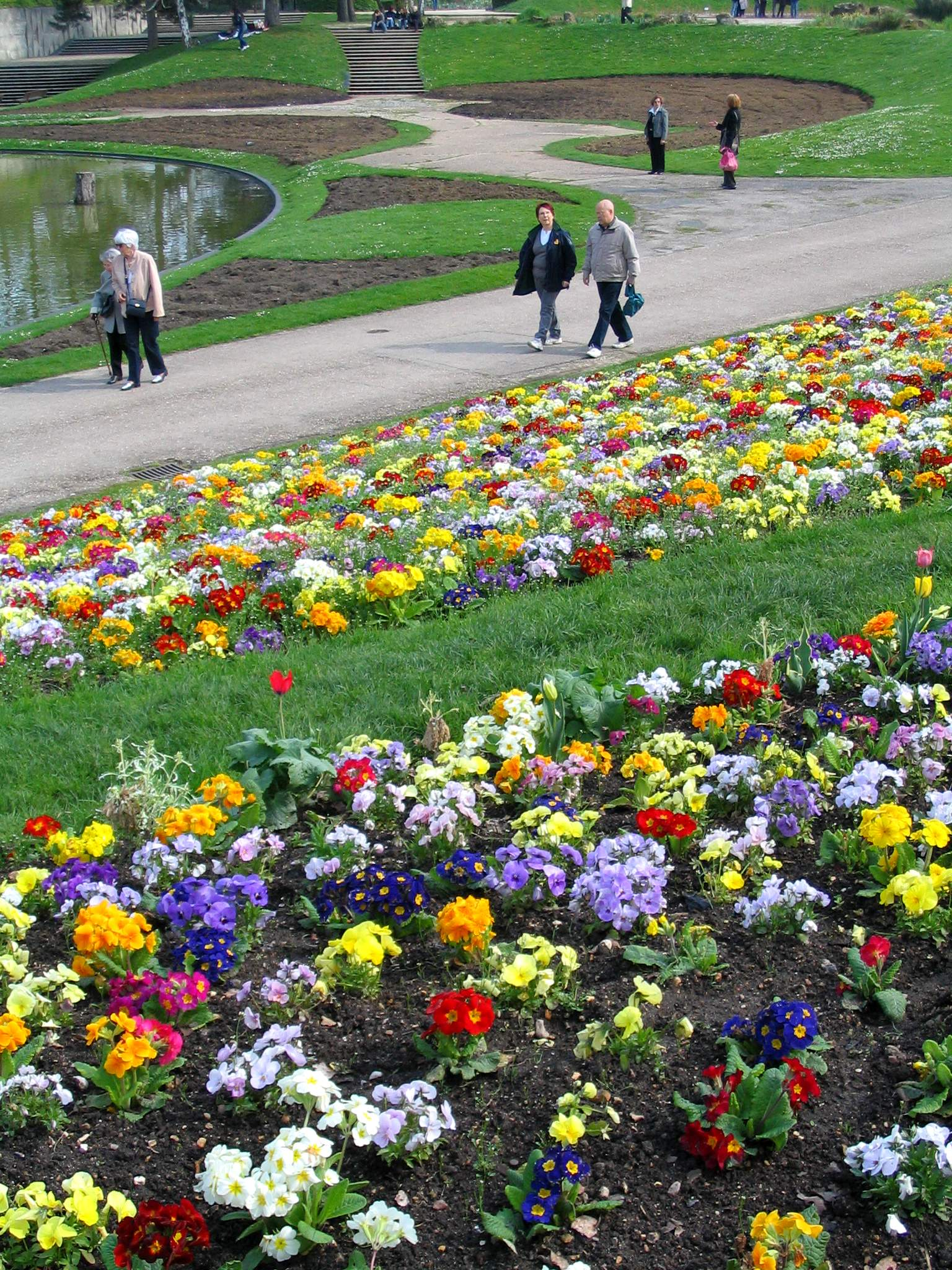
Flower beds of the Parc Floral de Paris

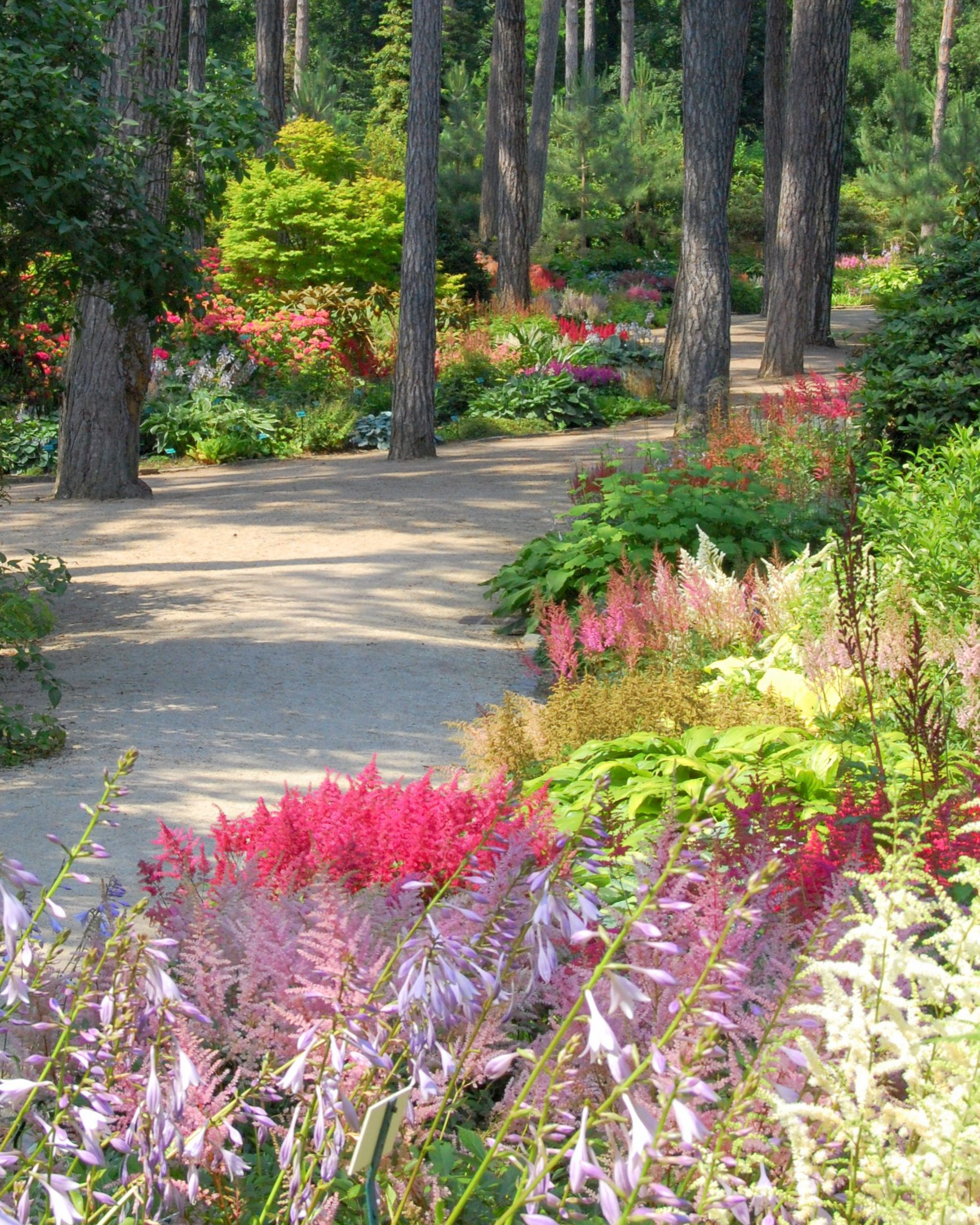
La pinède, the avenue of pines in the Parc Floral de Paris.

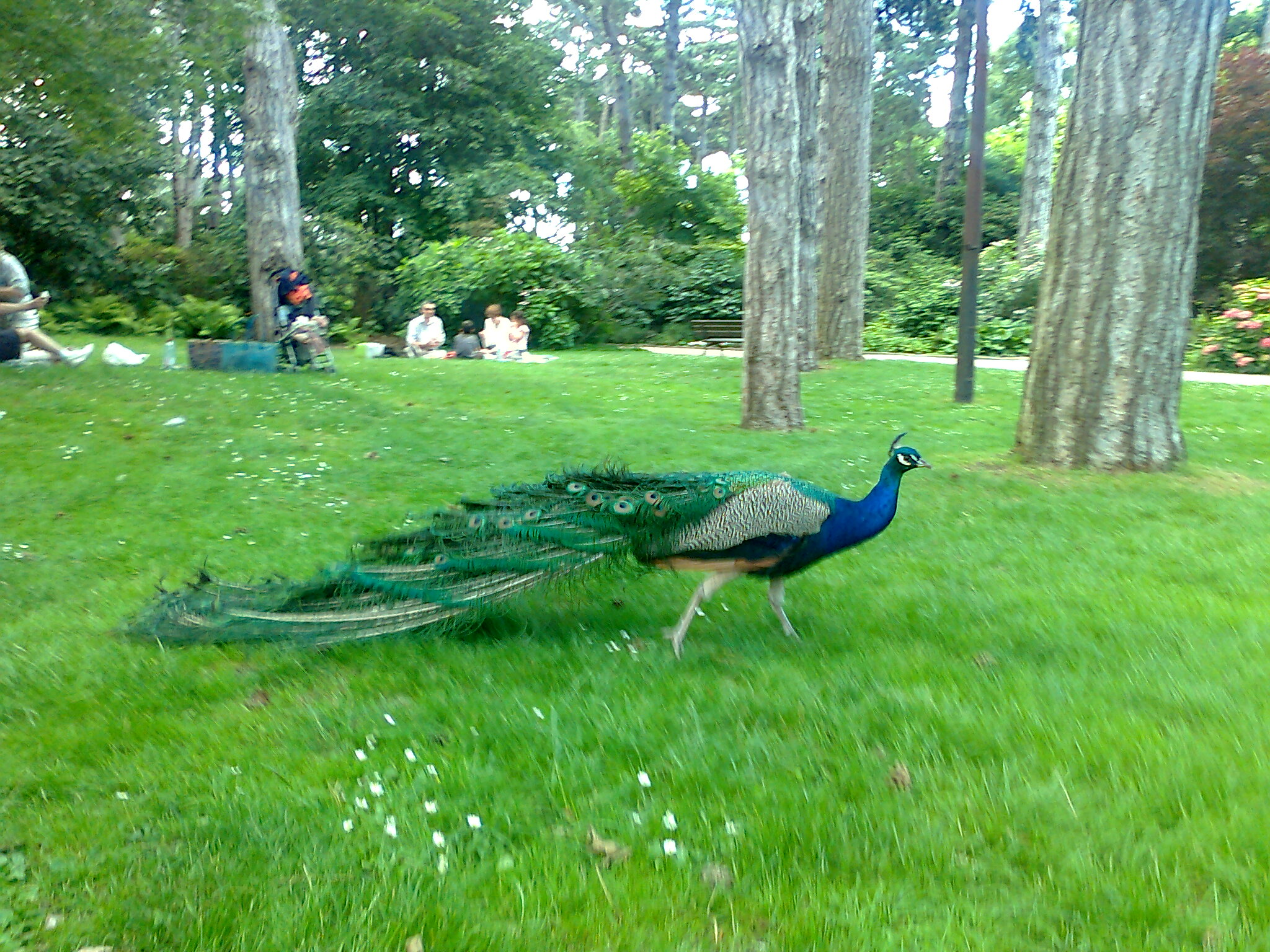
A peacock in the Parc Floral de Paris.

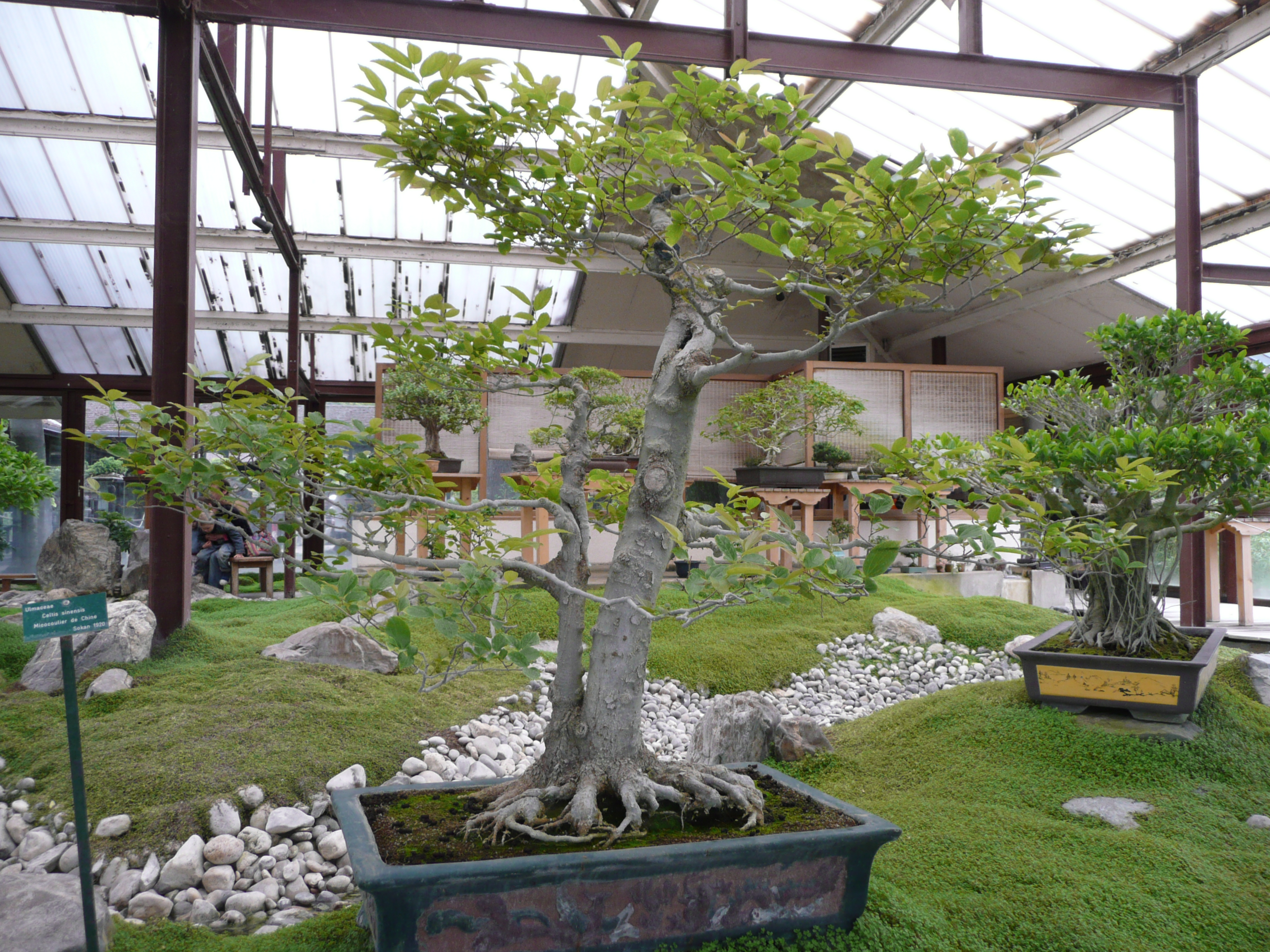
Greenhouse of bonsai trees in the Parc Floral de Paris.

The Arboretum de l'École du Breuil, in the park's southeast corner, is a municipal arboretum established at this location in 1936. It was created in 1867 by Baron Haussmann as the city's school of horticulture and arboriculture. Today the arboretum contains about 2000 trees, as well as notable collections of shrubs, four hundred varieties of heritage apple and pear trees, and three hundred varieties of lilac.

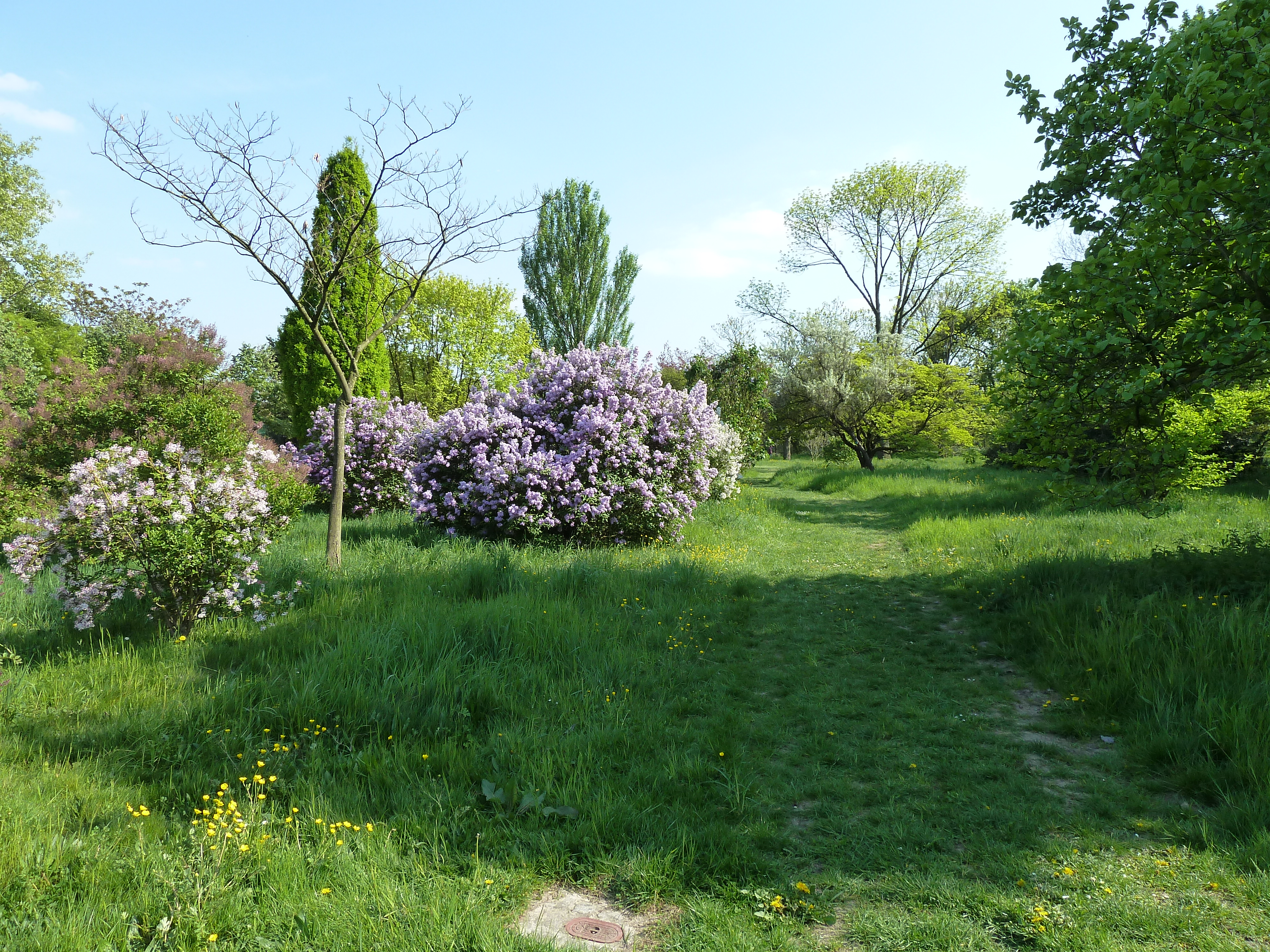
Lilacs in the Arboretum de l'École du Breuil.

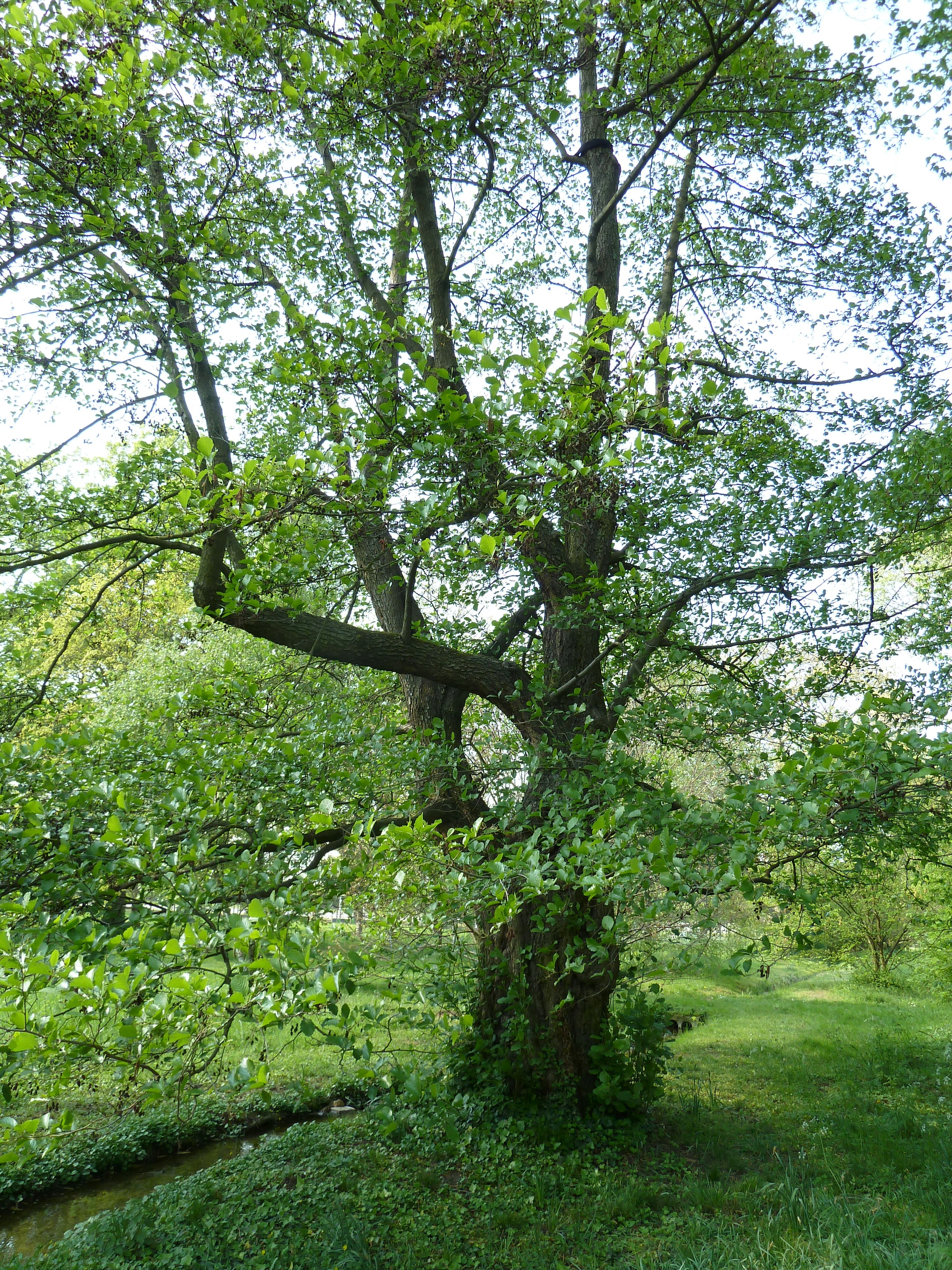
An Alnus serrulata or hazel alder tree in Arboretum.
- The Jardin tropical de Paris, of 4.5 hectares, was originally the Colonial Experimental Garden, opened in 1899 to study tropical plants. In 1907 it was the site of the first French Colonial Exposition, with pavilions and villages, complete with inhabitants, from different parts of the Empire. (See history above). The garden gradually fell into disrepair; the tropical plants were largely replaced by French plants, though bamboo, rubber trees and a few other exotic plants can still be found. The pavilions of the French Congo, French Guiana, French Indochina, Réunion, and Tunisia, mostly vandalized and in ruins, can still be seen, as well as vestiges of the old Indochinese garden. In 1916, the first-ever mosque built in France in more than a millennium was erected in the jardin tropical as part of a hospital complex that served Muslim soldiers. It was disaffected and demolished in 1919. The garden was taken over by the City of Paris in 2003, and it is gradually being redesigned and replanted.
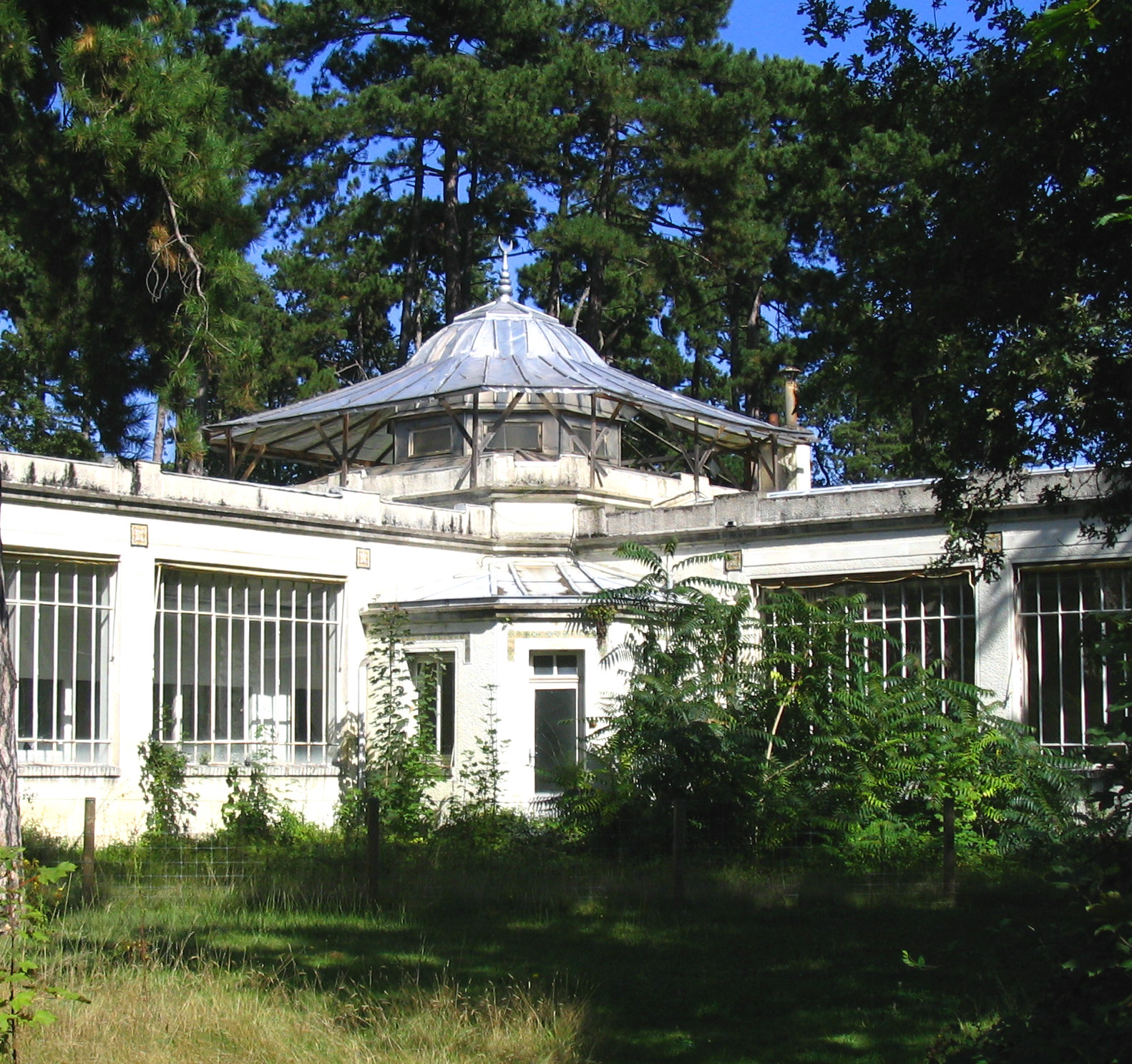
The Tunisian Pavilion, a vestige of the 1907 Colonial Exposition. The original tropical plants have largely been replaced by native French trees and bushes.

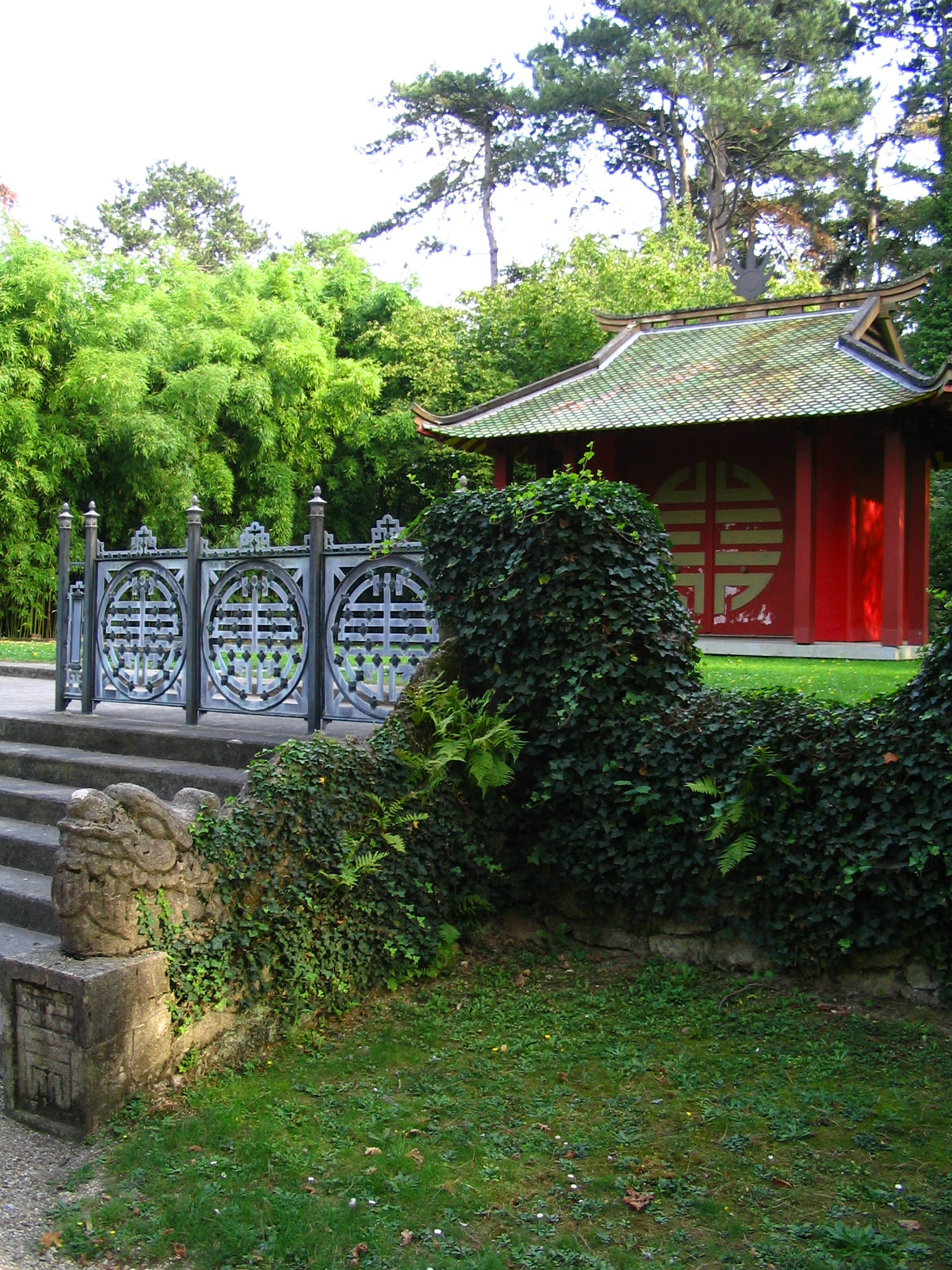
The esplanade de Dinh is a vestige of the Indochinese garden from the 1907 Colonial Exposition.

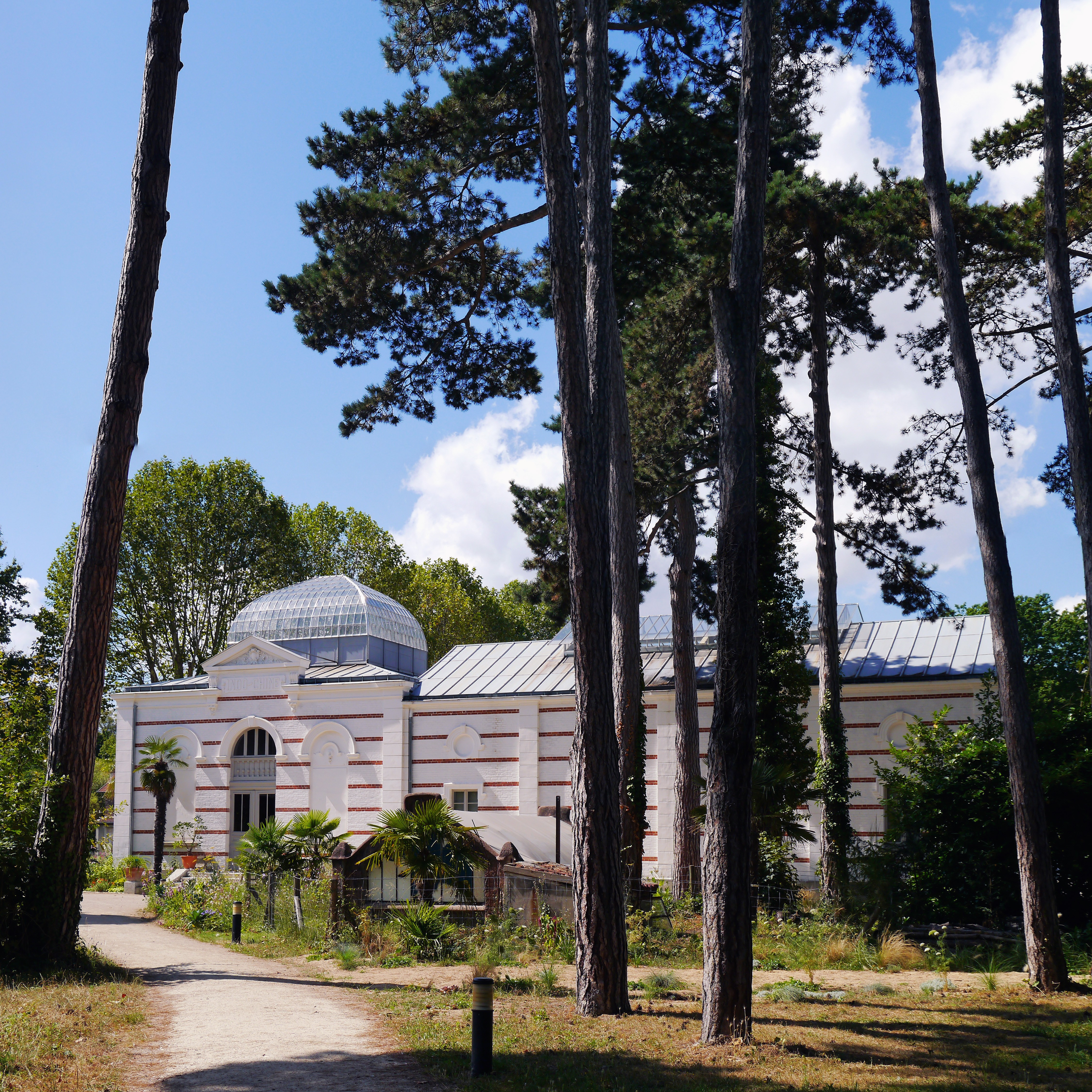
The Pavilion of Indochina from the 1907 Colonial Exposition.

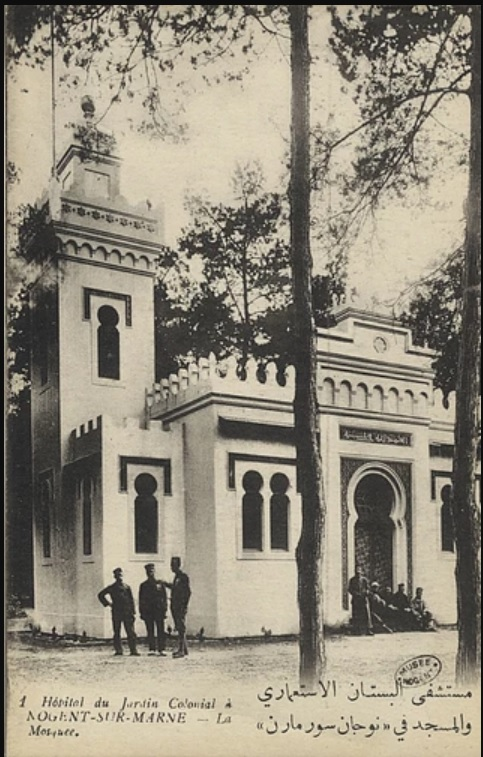
The Mosque of the Bois de Vincennes (late 1910s)
- The Paris Zoological Park, also known as Zoo of Vincennes, was opened in 1934, inspired by the popular zoo of the 1931 Colonial Exposition. It was modelled upon the Tierpark Hagenbeck in Hamburg, and was revolutionary for its time for putting the animals in open plateaus separated from the public by moats rather than in cages. The most prominent feature is a sixty-five meter high artificial mountain, which is the home of a herd of mouflon, or wild sheep. The zoo has a notable history of successfully breeding wild species, including Indian elephants. The park suffered from the crumbling of its concrete buildings in the 1980s, since they had been built to last only fifty years. It was closed in 2008 for major renovation, and reopened in 2014.
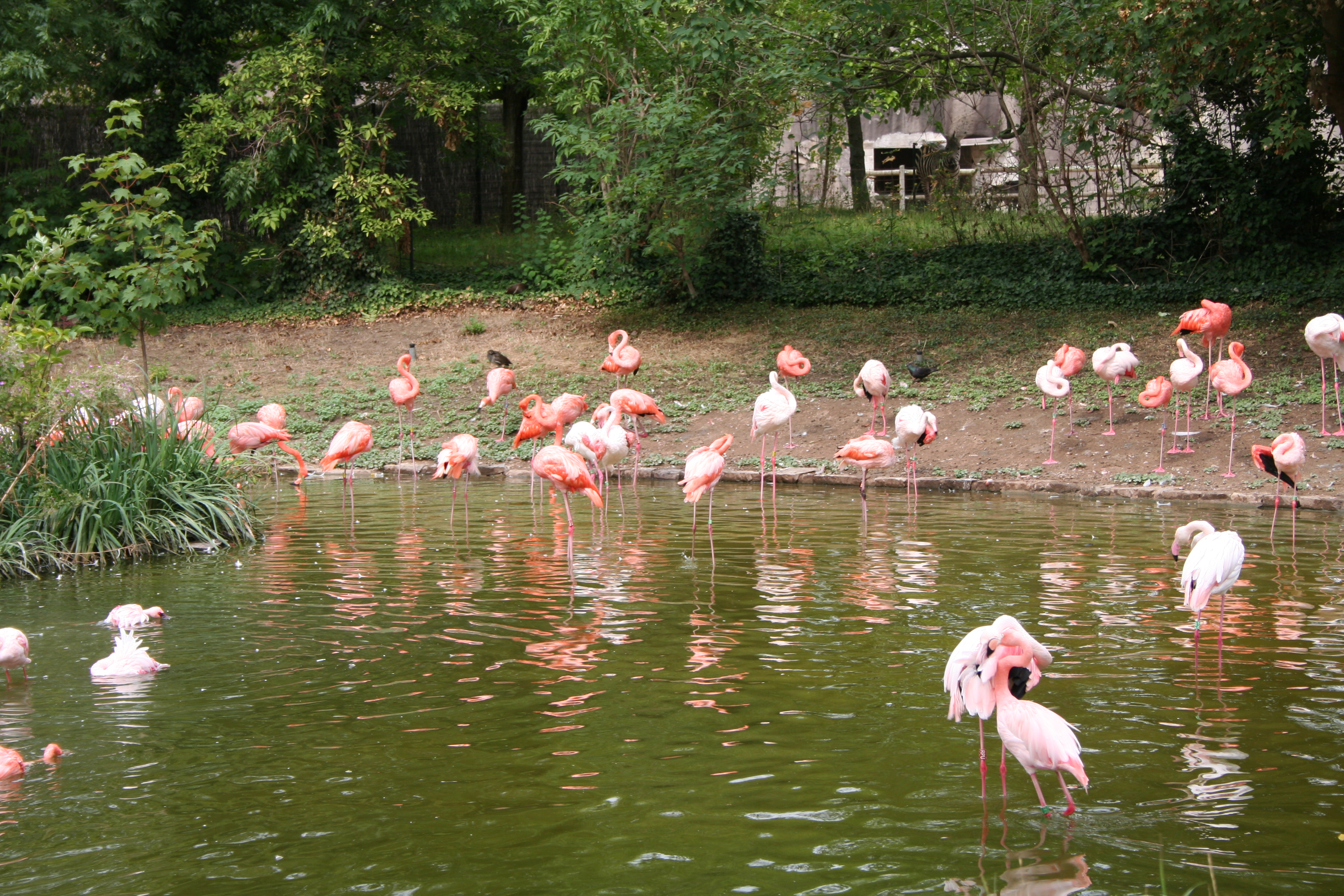
Flamingoes in the Paris Zoo.

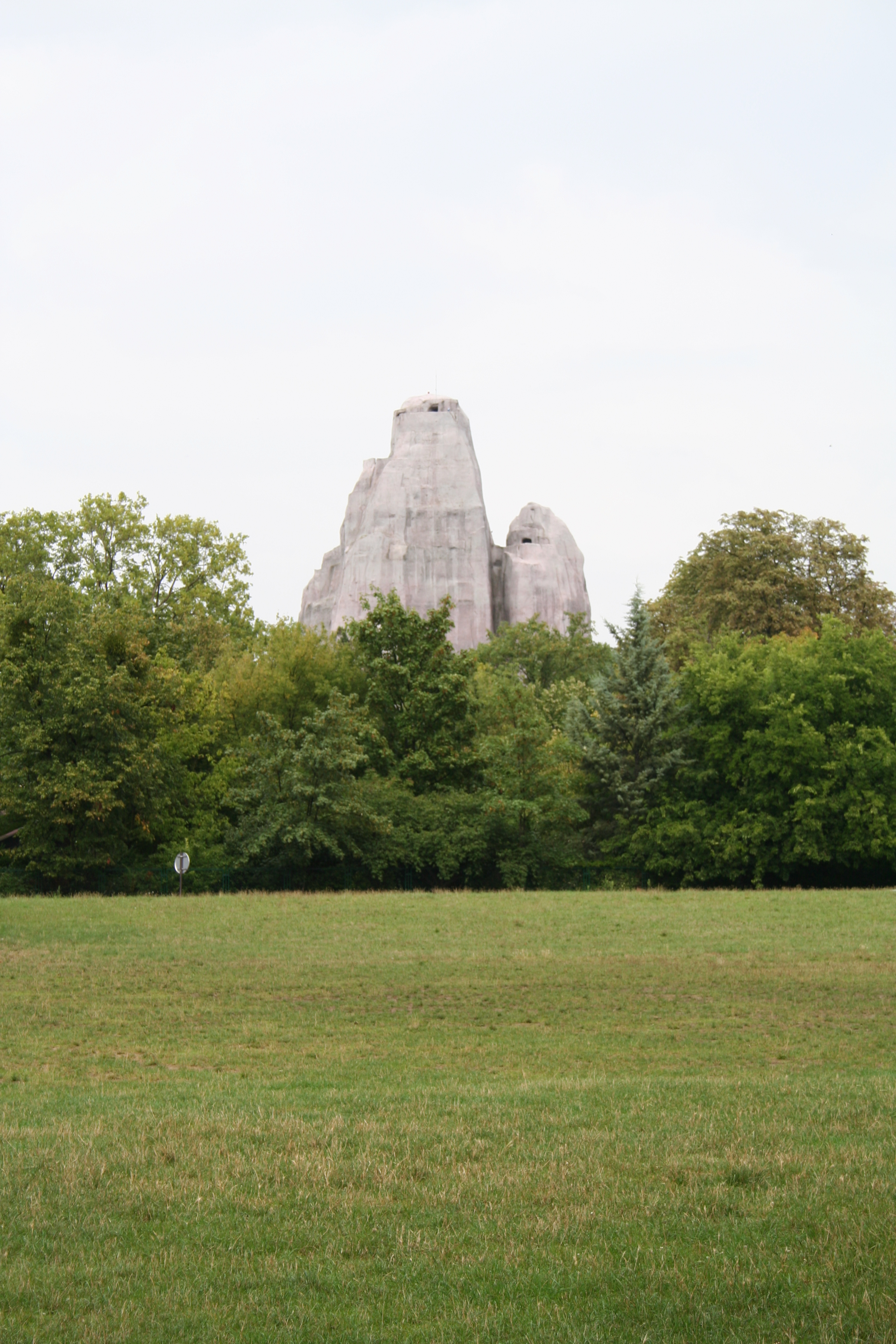
The 65-meter-high artificial mountain in the Paris Zoo has the best view of the park from its summit.

=== Architecture ===
- The Cartoucherie de Vincennes is a former ammunition factory which has been turned into a theater center, which hosts many small theater companies. It was converted in 1970 by the Théâtre du Soleil, led by stage director Ariane Mnouchkine and actor Philippe Léotard.
- The Hippodrome of Vincennes was opened on 29 March 1863, and is devoted largely to harness racing. it was badly damaged during the French-German War of 1870–71, and was rebuilt in 1983. The tribunes today hold 35,000 spectators. Between 1970 and 1992, it was a concert venue for performers including the Grateful Dead, Bruce Springsteen, Elton John and Michael Jackson.
- The Vélodrome Jacques-Anquetil is a cycling stadium, built in 1896 and used in the 1900 Summer Olympics and 1924 Summer Olympics. It can hold forty thousand spectators. It is popularly called La Cipale, short for Piste Municipale.
- The Ferme Georges-Ville, also known as the Farm of Paris, is a small farm located next to the Hippodrome of Vincennes, designed to show schoolchildren a real working farm. It features cows, pigs, sheep and other farm animals, and small fields of corn, wheat and other crops. It is named for the French agronomist George Ville (1824–1897), who, with the support of the Emperor Louis Napoleon, introduced the use of chemical fertilizer to French farming.
- The Fort neuf de Vincennes (New fort of Vincennes, located in the north of the park near the Chateau de Vincennes, is a military installation serving as a training center and the headquarters of the medical services of the French military and other military detachments. It was one of a ring of fifteen forts built in a circle around Paris by King Louis Philippe I between 1841 and 1843. It is not open to the public.
- The Institut national du sport, de l'expertise et de la performance (National Institute of sport, expertise, and performance), or INSEP, is the national training school for physical education and sports, under the National Institute of Sport and Physical Education. Established in 1975, it includes facilities for training in swimming, gymnastics, tennis, shooting, archery, gymnastics, fencing, cycling and other sports, and has trained many French Olympic athletes.
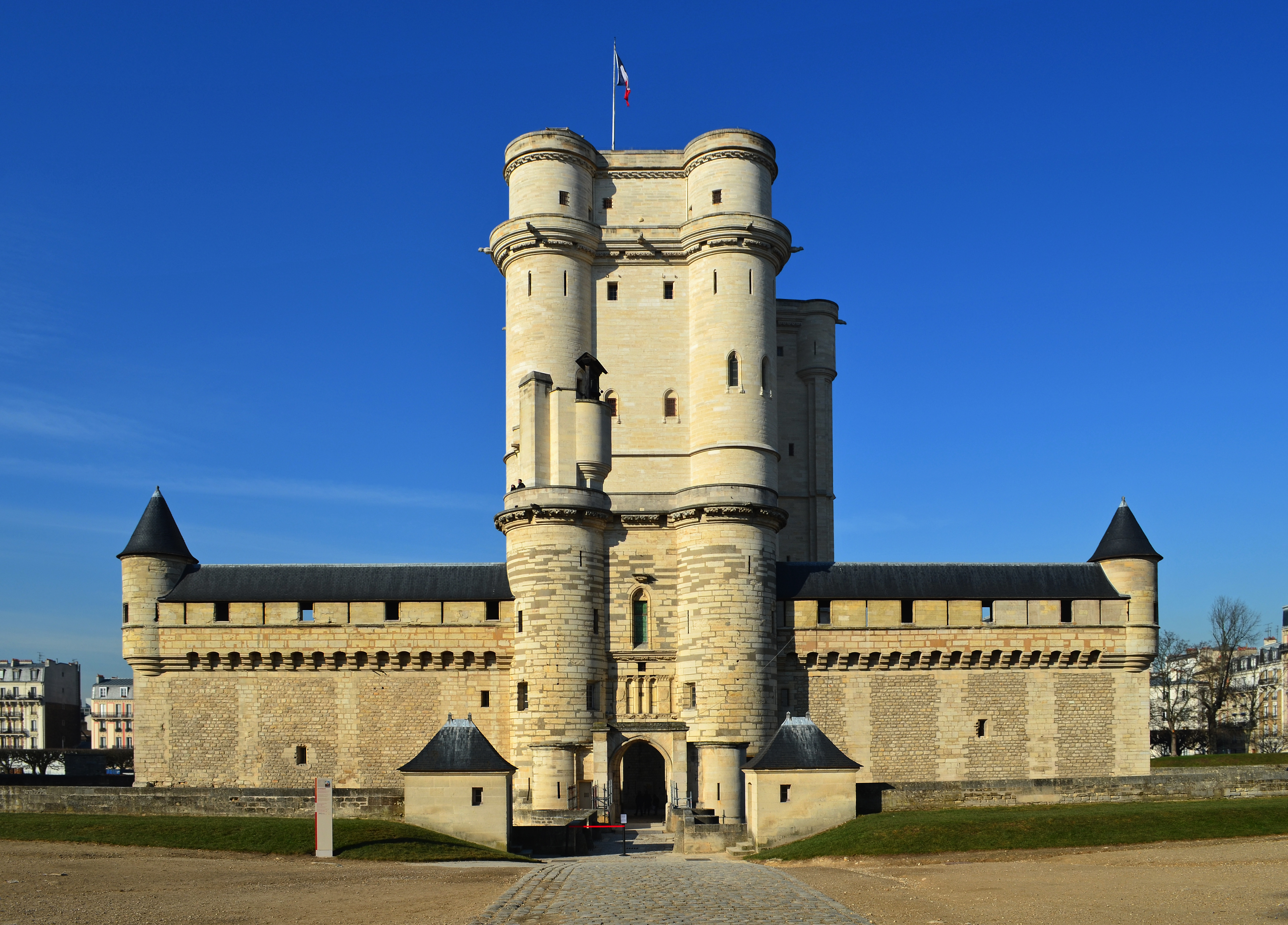
The donjon of the Château de Vincennes is open to the public.

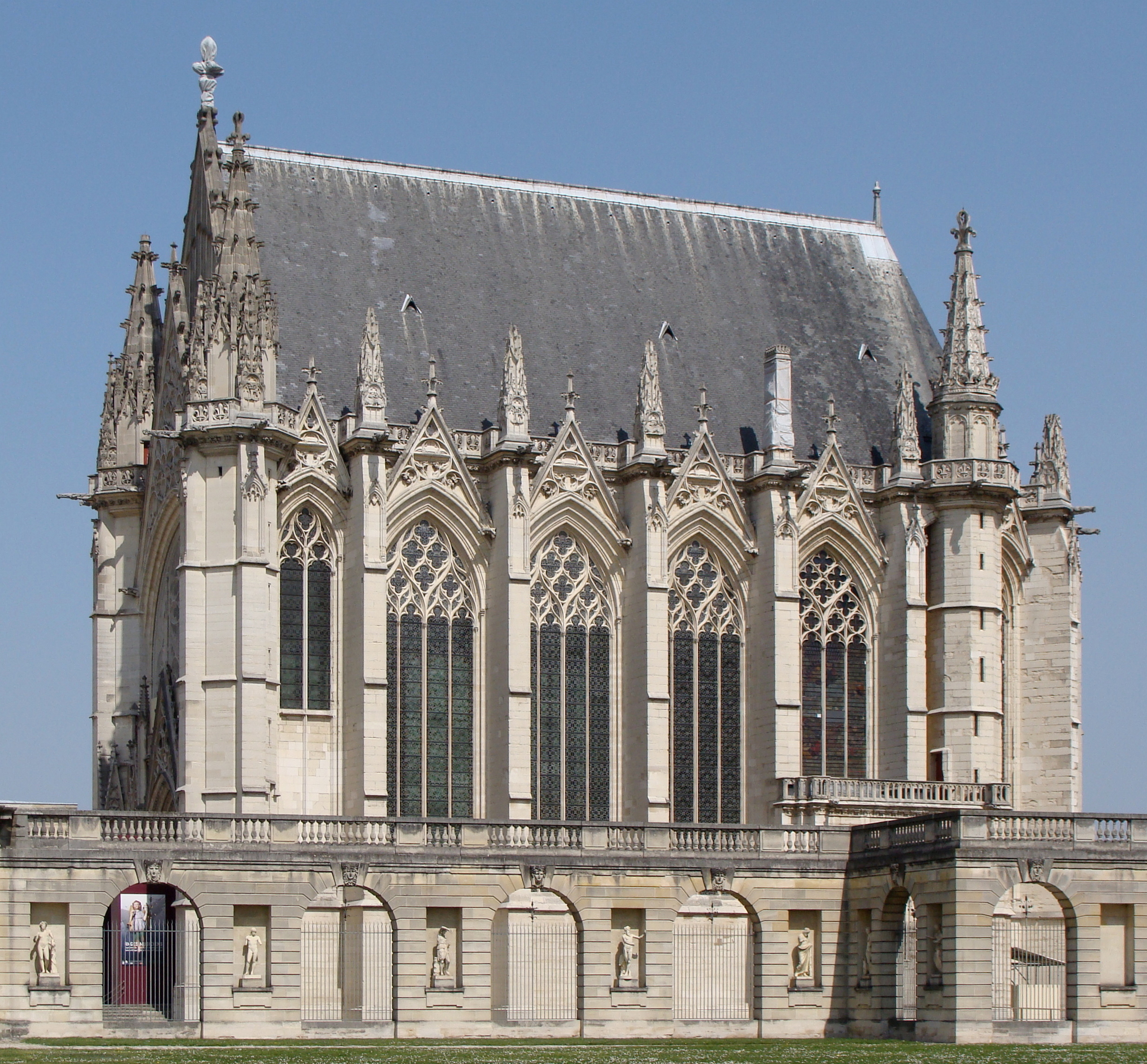
Sainte-Chapelle of the Chateau de Vincennes, built to contain relics of the Passion.

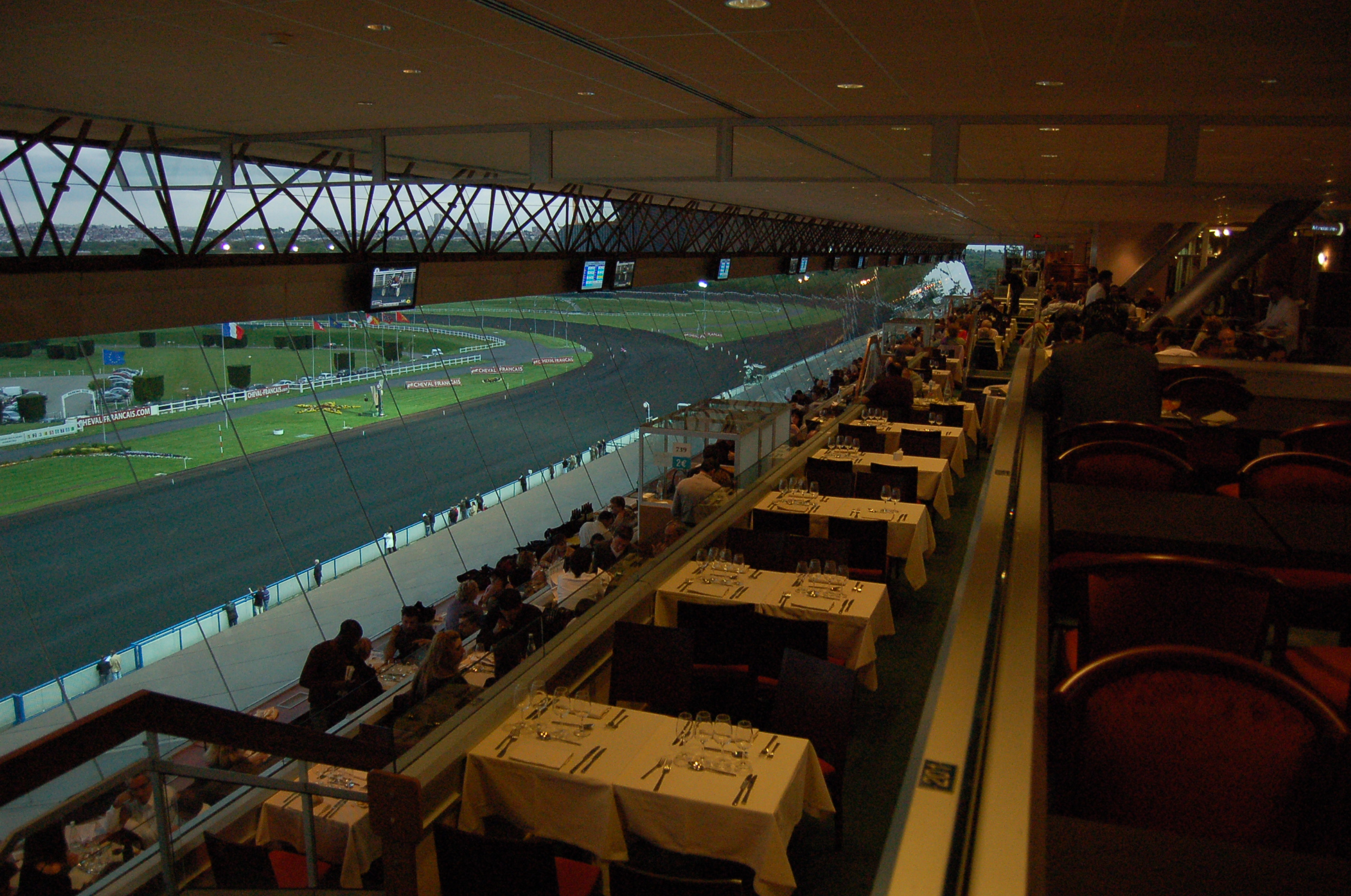
The Hippodrôme de Vincennes holds thirty-five thousand spectators in the tribunes.

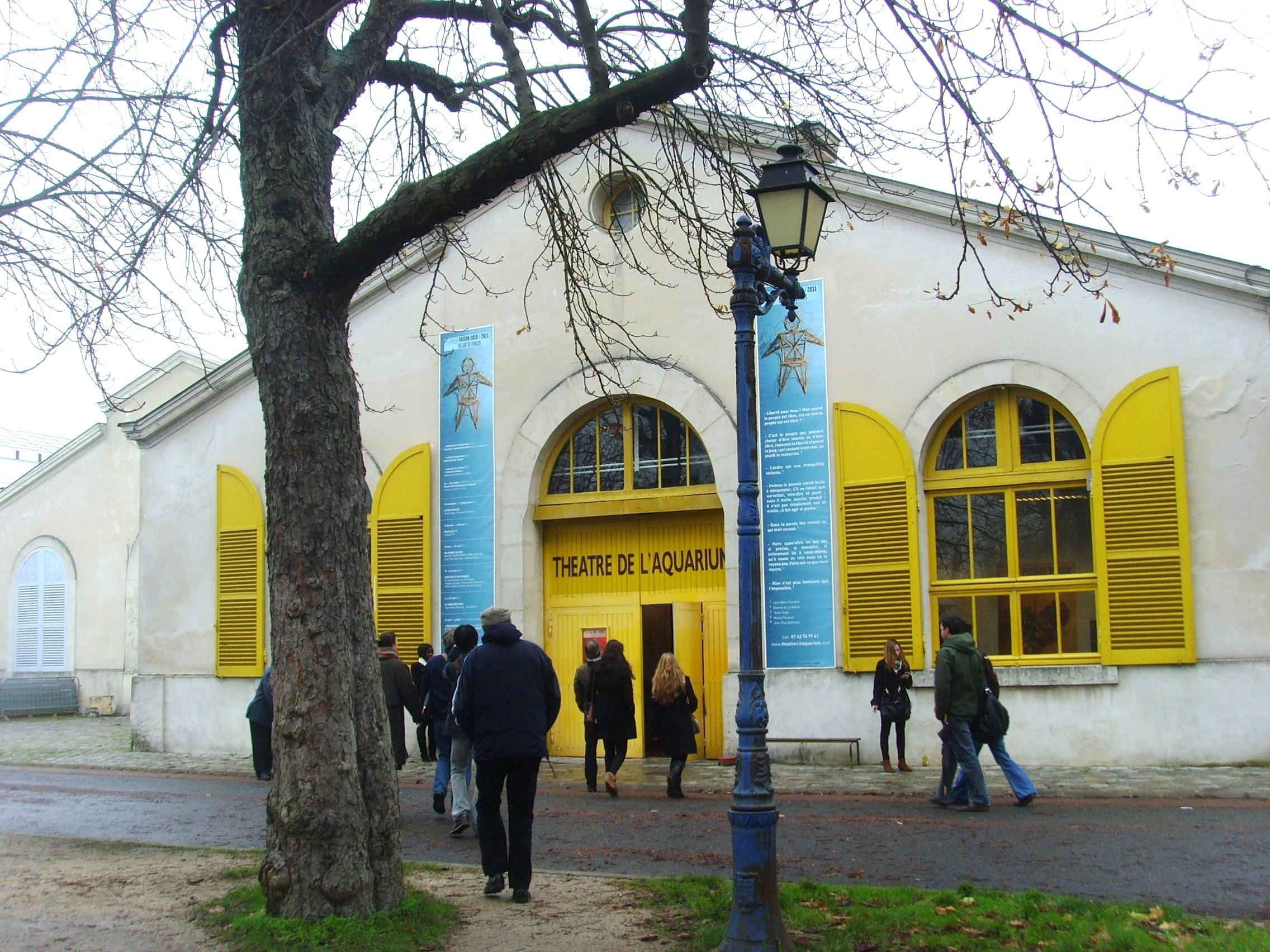
The Theater of the Aquarium, one of several stages in the Cartoucherie, a former ammunition factory turned into a theater center.

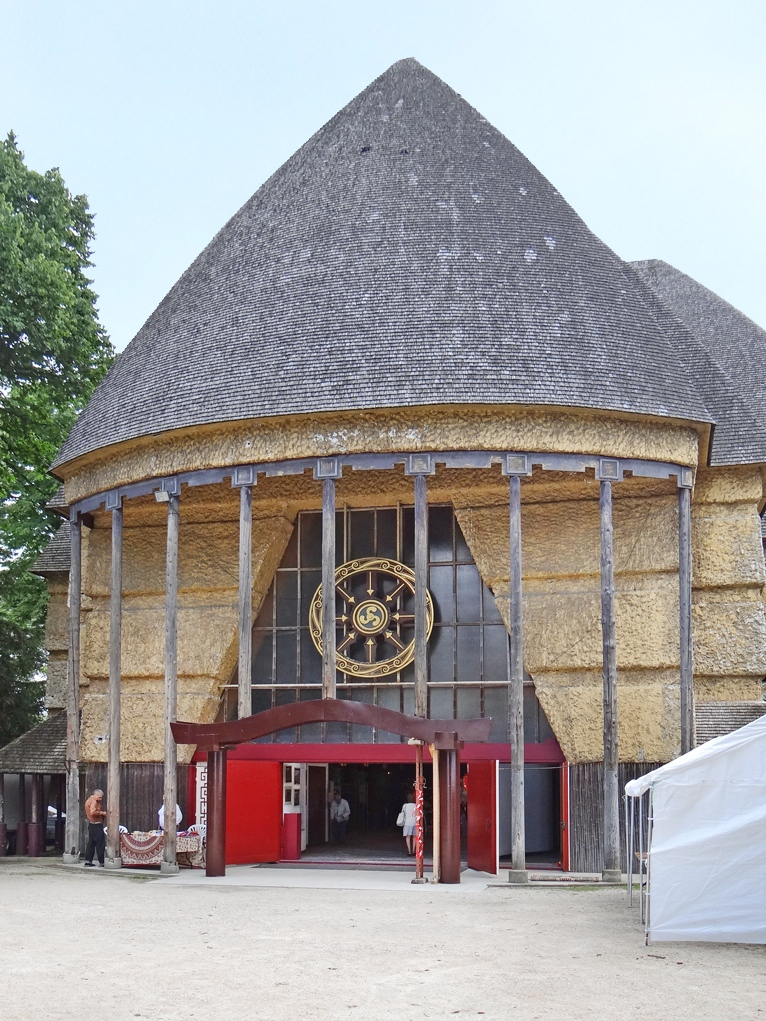
The Buddhist Religious Center, originally the Cameroon Pavilion of the 1931 Paris Colonial Exposition.

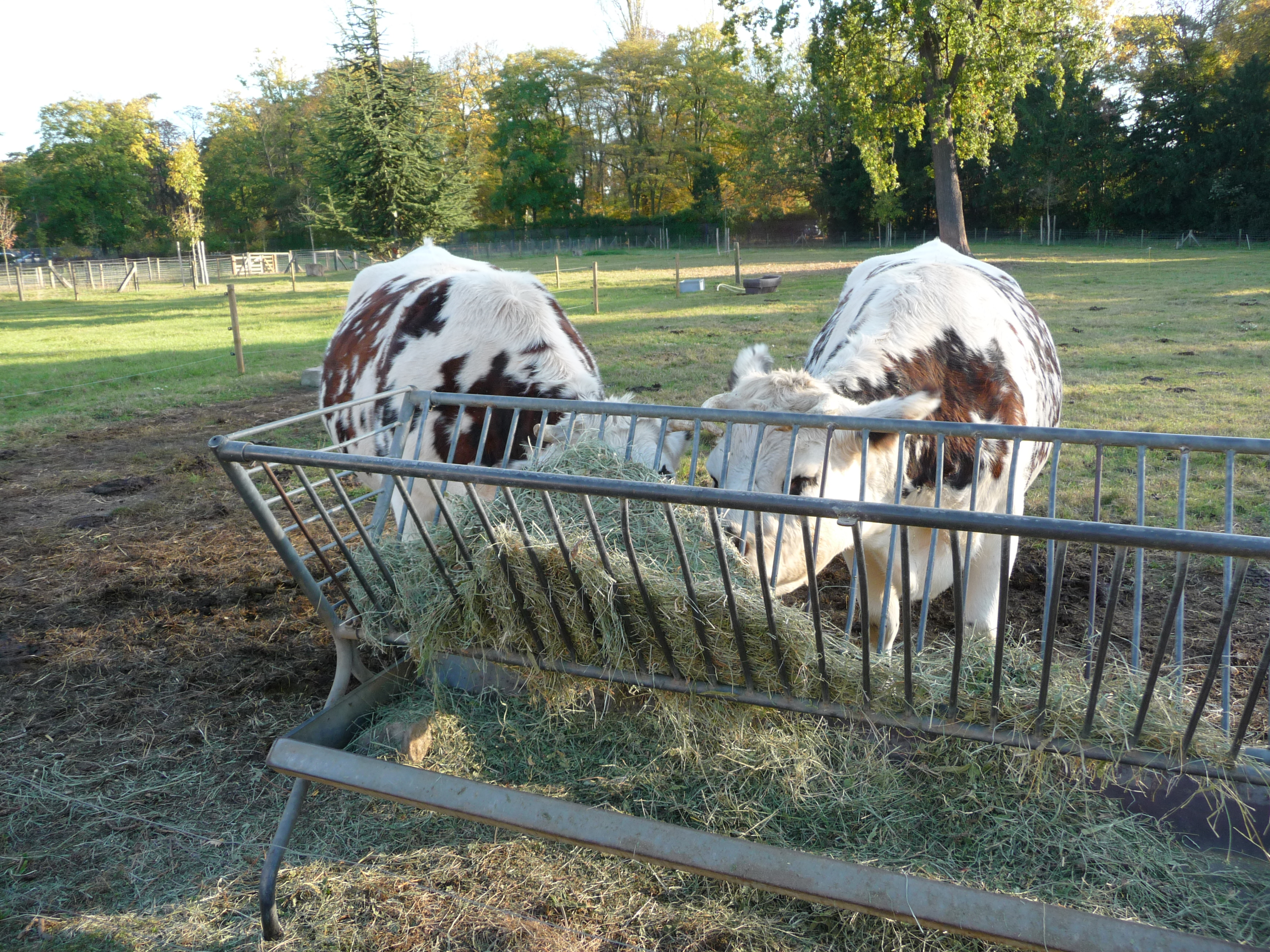
The Ferme-Georges-Ville, a small farm next to the Hippodrome, designed to show Paris schoolchildren the work of a real farm.

== Human trafficking ==
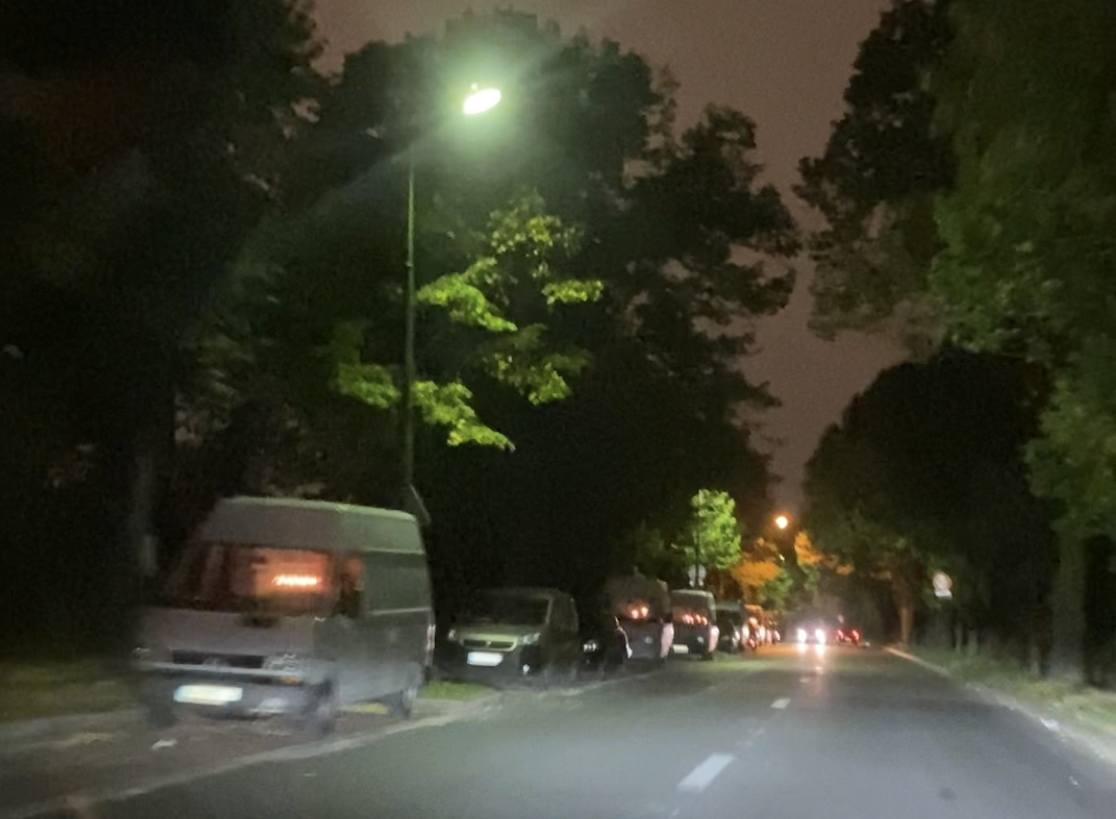
Prostitutes signal their presence to customers using lamps.

Several prostitution rings related to human trafficking in West Africa operate in the Bois de Vincennes. As explained by French senator Christian Cambon:

This exploitation ... comes from a recent triangular trade that spans from West Africa to Europe, through Maghreb. The victims leave Nigeria by car or bus to Libya and arrive in Italy by boat.

Most prostitutes await customers along the Route de la Pyramide out on the sidewalk or in nearby vans on the curbside parking and signal their presence by illuminating their windshields. As they are intimidated into paying off their journey from Nigeria, they are often subject to sexual or physical violence from their customers.

== See also ==
- History of parks and gardens of Paris
- Bois de Boulogne
