= Arboretum de l'École du Breuil =

Arboretum in Paris, France

Coordinates: 48°49′17″N 2°27′23″E

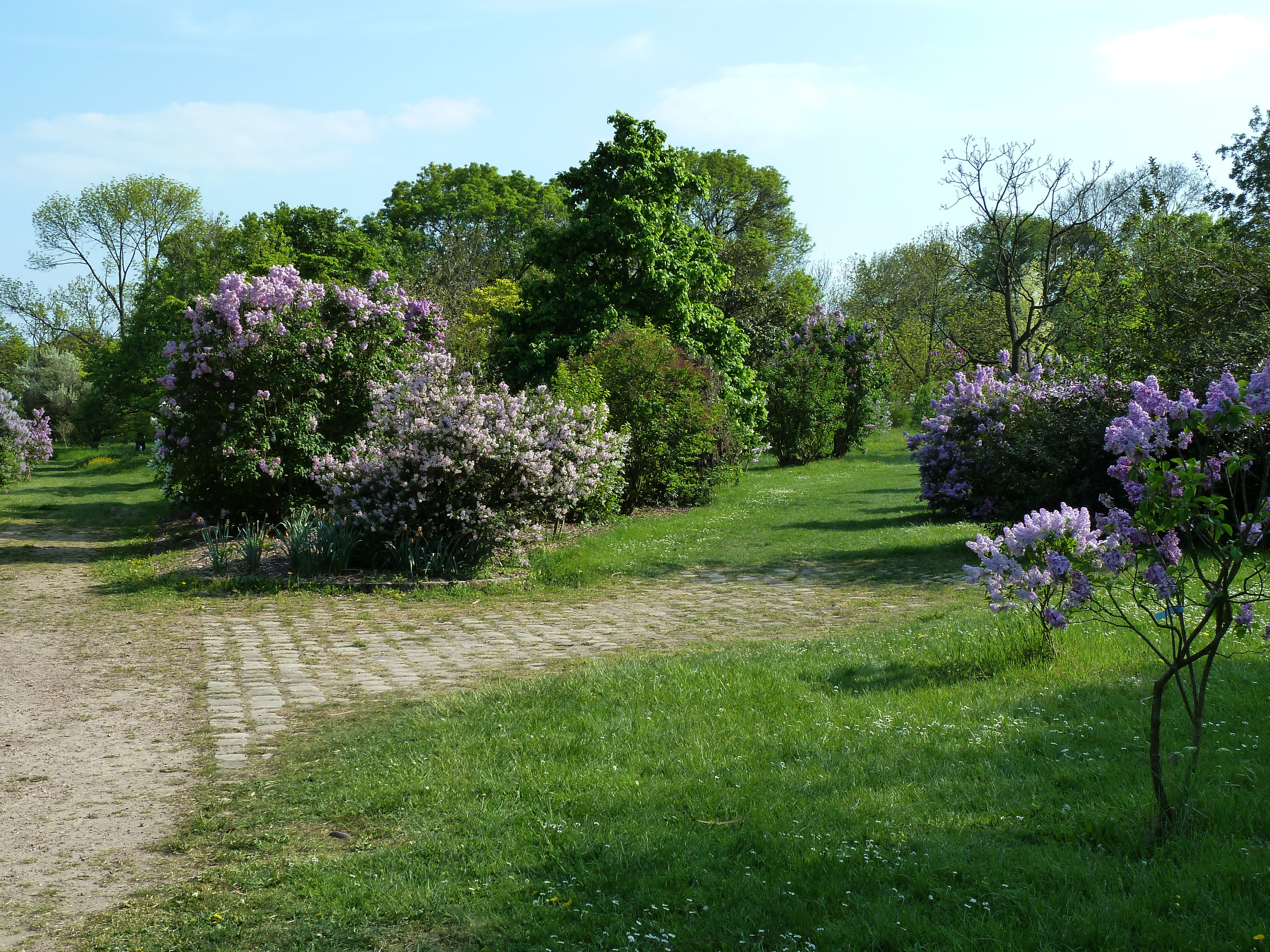
Lilacs of the Arboretum de l'École du Breuil

The Arboretum de l'École du Breuil (12 hectares) is a municipal arboretum located on the Route de la Ferme in the southeast corner of the Bois de Vincennes, Paris, France. It now forms part of the Jardin botanique de la Ville de Paris.

The École du Breuil (25 hectares) was created in 1867 by Baron Haussmann as the city's school of horticulture and arboriculture, and named for Alphonse Du Breuil, professor at the Conservatoire national des Arts et Métiers, who taught arboriculture from 1867 to 1887. It was originally located on 4 hectares in Saint-Mandé near today's Palais de la Porte Dorée but in 1936 transferred to its current location.

Today the arboretum contains about 2000 trees, representing 112 genera, 485 species, and 400 cultivars and varieties (885 taxa), as well as several collections of shrubs representing about 1,000 taxa. Of particular interest are its collections of heritage apple and pear trees (about 400 varieties), and its excellent lilac collection (about 300 varieties) which has been recognized by the Conservatoire des Collections Végétales Spécialisées (CCVS).

== See also ==
- List of botanical gardens in France
