= Jean-Charles =

Jean-Charles and Jean-Carles is a French masculine given name. Notable people with the name include:

- Jean Charles, Chevalier Folard (1669–1752), French soldier and military author
- Jean-Charles Adolphe Alphand (1817–1891), French engineer
- Jean-Charles Bédard (1766–1825), Quebec-born priest and Sulpician
- Jean-Charles Brisard, international expert and consultant on international terrorism
- Jean-Charles Canetti (1945–2025), Italian footballer
- Jean-Charles Cantin (1918–2005), Canadian politician
- Jean-Charles Chapais (1811–1885), Canadian Conservative politician
- Jean-Charles Chebat (1945–2019), Canadian marketing researcher
- Jean-Charles Chenu (1808–1879), French physician and naturalist
- Jean-Charles Cirilli (born 1982), French professional football player
- Jean-Charles Cornay (1809–1837), French missionary of the Paris Foreign Missions Society in Vietnam
- Jean-Charles de Borda (1733–1799), French mathematician, physicist and political scientist
- Jean-Charles de Castelbajac (born 1949), fashion designer
- Jean-Charles de la Faille (1597–1652), Flemish Jesuit
- Jean Charles Dominique de Lacretelle (1766–1855), French historian and journalist
- Jean Charles de Menezes (1978–2005), Brazilian man shot at the London Underground
- Jean-Charles Faugère, French mathematician
- Jean Charles Galissard de Marignac (1817–1894), Swiss chemist
- Jean-Charles Gicquel (born 1967), French high jumper
- Jean-Charles Gille (1924–1995), German-born Canadian engineer, psychiatrist and professor of medicine
- Jean-Carles Grelier (born 1966), French politician
- Jean-Charles Houzeau (1820–1888), Belgian astronomer and journalist
- Jean-Charles Jacobs (1821–1907), Belgian doctor and entomologist
- Jean-Charles Létourneau (1775–1838), notary and political figure in Lower Canada
- Jean-Charles Marchiani (born 1943), French prefect and politician
- Jean-Charles Moreux (1889–1956), French architect
- Jean-Charles Prince (1804–1860), Canadian Roman Catholic priest, teacher, seminary administrator and editor
- Jean-Charles Richard Berger (1924–2001), Canadian politician
- Jean-Charles Sénac (born 1985), French road bicycle racer
- Jean-Charles Snoy et d'Oppuers (1907–1991), Belgian civil servant, diplomat and politician
- Jean-Charles Tacchella (1925–2024), French screenwriter and film director
- Jean-Charles Taugourdeau (born 1953), member of the National Assembly of France
- Jean-Charles Trouabal (born 1965), French sprinter
- Jean-Charles Valladont (born 1989), French archer

== Surname ==
- Shemar Jean-Charles (born 1998), American football player

== Other uses ==
- Jean Charles (film), a 2009 Brazilian film about Jean Charles de Menezes

== Places ==
- Isle de Jean Charles, Louisiana, a barrier island off the Louisiana coast

== See also ==
- Dutch: Jan Karel
- English: John Charles
- Italian: Giancarlo
- Spanish: Juan Carlos
- Portuguese: João Carlos
