= Moreux =

Moreux may refer to:

- Jean-Charles Moreux (1889–1956), French architect
- Théophile Moreux (1867–1954), French astronomer and meteorologist
- Moreux (crater), a crater in the Ismenius Lacus quadrangle on Mars
- 14914 Moreux, minor planet
