= Jardin des Plantes du Mans =

Botanical garden in Pays de la Loire, France

Coordinates: 48°00′23″N 2°01′18″E

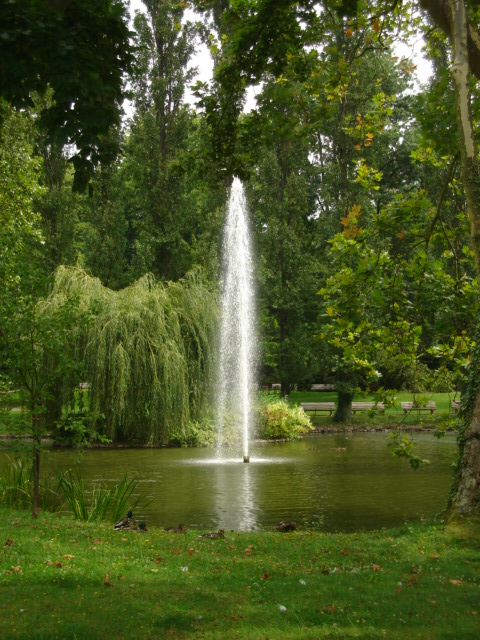
Jardin des Plantes du Mans

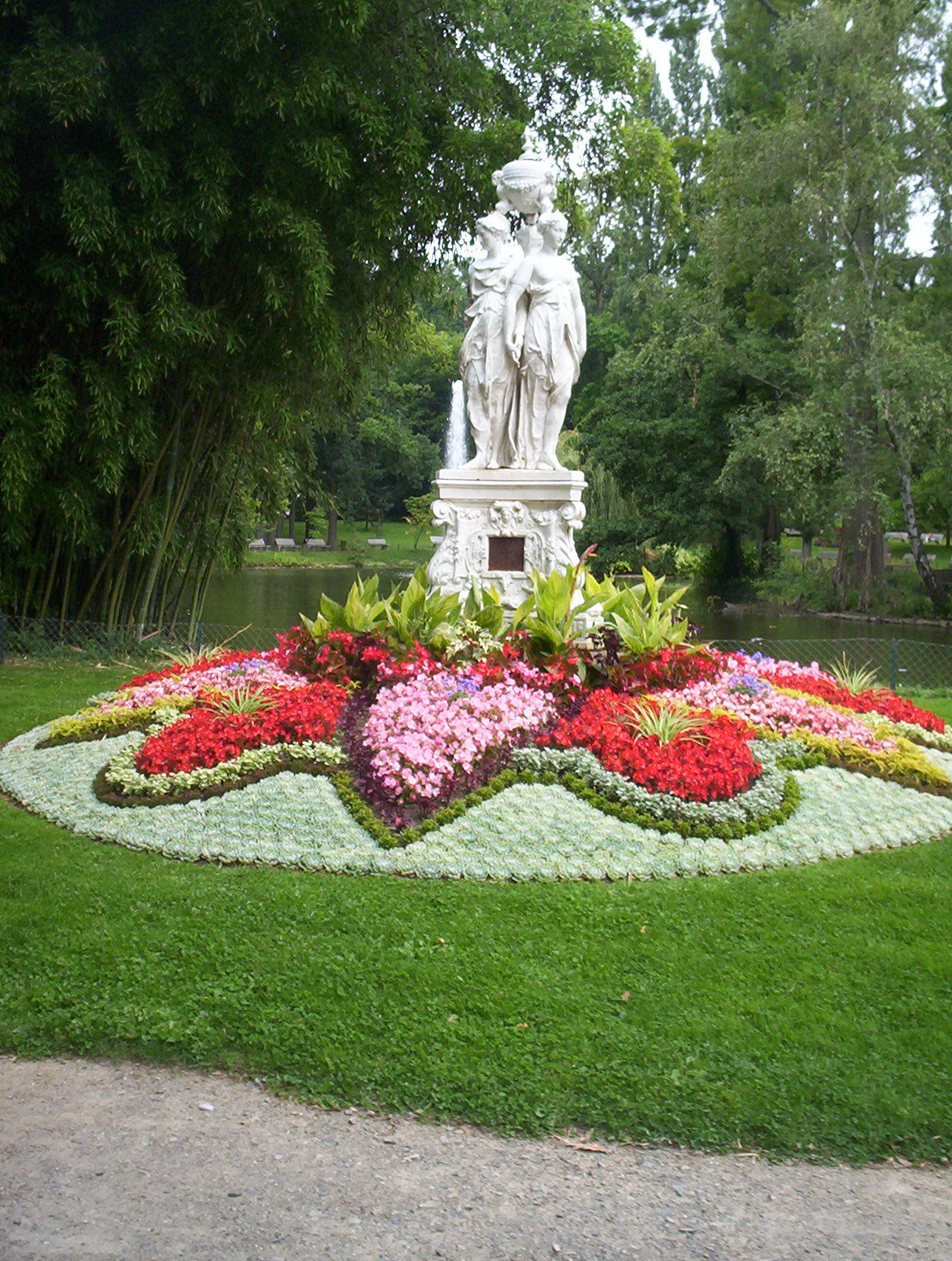
Statue with plantings

The Jardin des Plantes du Mans (8 hectares), also known as the Jardin d'Horticulture du Mans, is a botanical garden located at 4 Rue de Sinault, Le Mans, Sarthe, Pays de la Loire, France. It is open daily without charge.

The garden was created between 1867 and 1870 to designs by Jean-Charles Adolphe Alphand, who also designed Paris's Parc Monceau, Bois de Boulogne, and Bois de Vincennes. It consists of two major sections linked by small tunnels: a French garden (3 hectares) with rose garden and terraced walk planted with four rows of Tilia nearly 100 years old, and an English-style park (4 hectares) with fine trees and a large pond.

== See also ==
- List of botanical gardens in France
