= Le Cri de Paris =

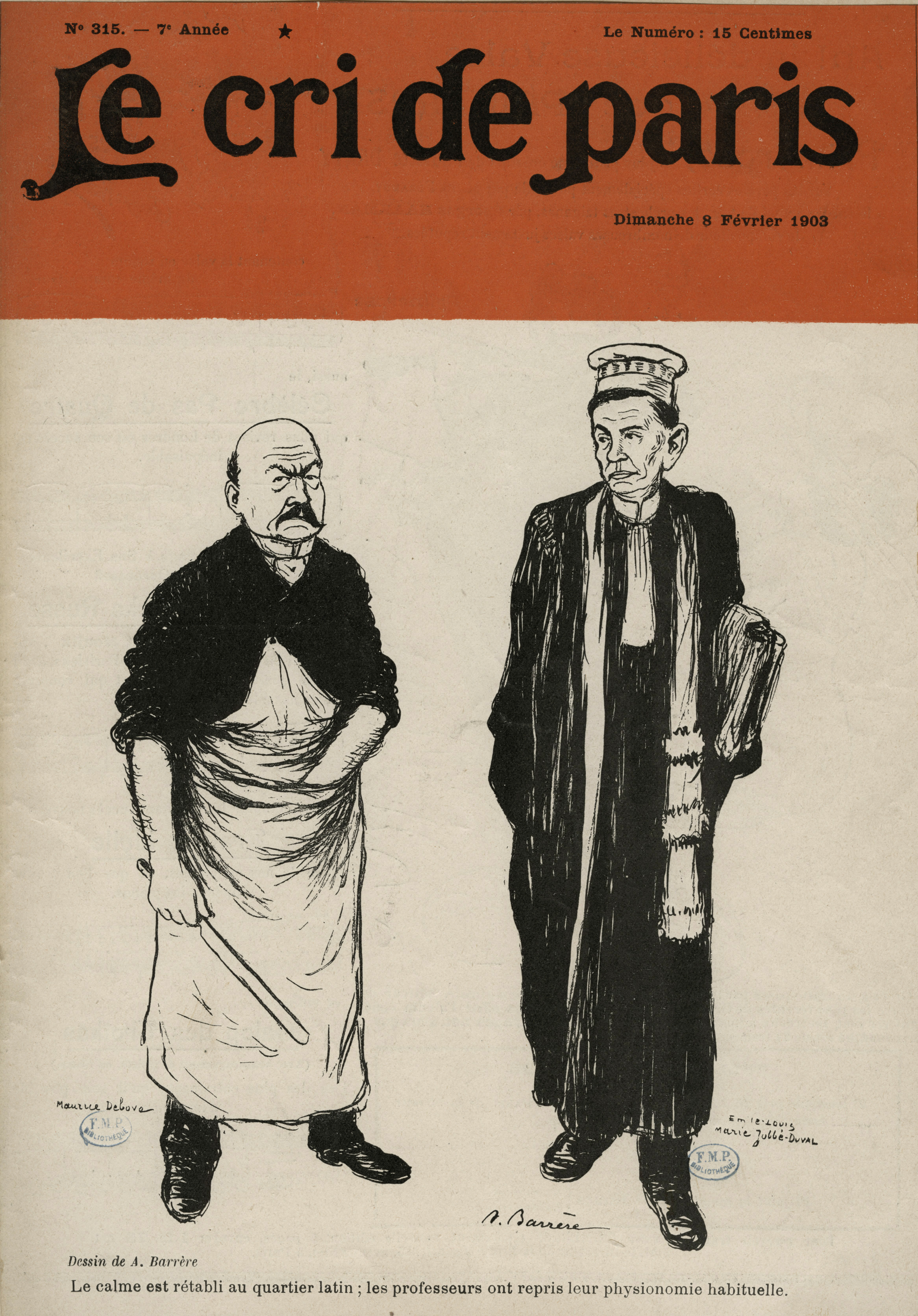
Cover of the issue published on February 8, 1903

Le Cri de Paris was an illustrated French political magazine that was founded by Alexandre Natanson in 1897 and was at the beginning a supplement of La Revue Blanche.

Le Cri de Paris title means The Paris Protest in English, but it has in French two other meanings like Paris Fashion (as in « le dernier cri », chic, etc.) and cri as in cris de Paris, i.e. the street cries. This ambiguous title was forged by Félix Fénéon.

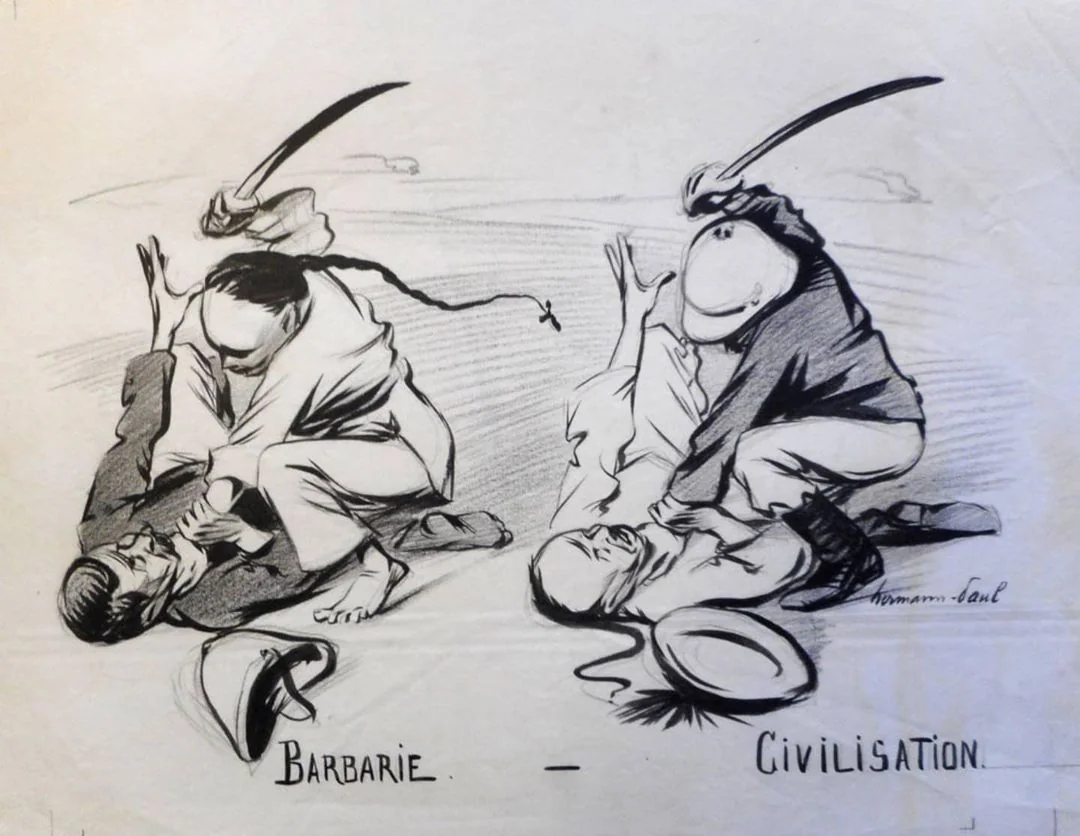
Anti-colonialist cartoon published in 1899. In it, Hermann-Paul denounces the Western hypocrisy used to justify colonization.

The magazine covered news, political articles and satire. Juan Gris was one of its illustrators. It featured pro-Dreyfus and anti-colonialist drawings by Hermann Paul and Ibels. The magazine was subject to frequent censorship. Le Cri de Paris ceased publication in 1940.
