= Parc des Buttes Chaumont =

Urban park in Paris, France

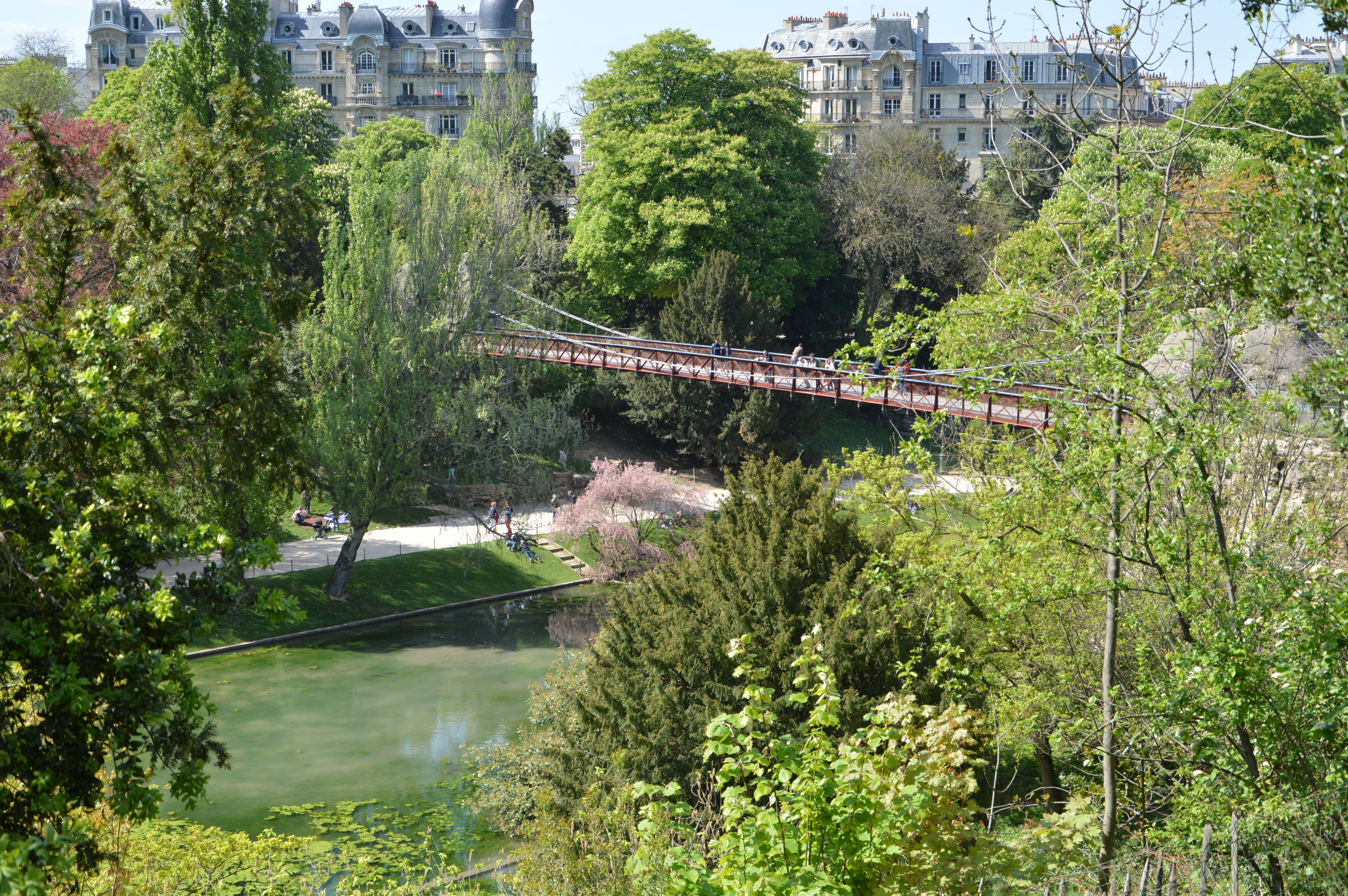
- Lake with suspension bridge
- Interactive map of Parc des Buttes Chaumont
- Type: Urban park
- Location: 19th arrondissement, Paris
- Coordinates: 48°52′49″N 2°22′58″E
- Area: 61 acres (25 ha)
- Created: 1 April 1867
- Operator: Direction des Espaces Verts et de l'Environnement (DEVE)
- Status: Open all year
- Public transit: Located near the Métro stations: Buttes Chaumont, Laumière and Botzaris

The Parc des Buttes Chaumont (French pronunciation: [paʁk de byt ʃomɔ̃]; English: Park of Buttes Chaumont) is a public park situated in northeastern Paris, France, in the 19th arrondissement. Occupying 24.7 hectares (61 acres), it is the fifth-largest park in Paris, after the Bois de Vincennes, Bois de Boulogne, Parc de la Villette and Tuileries Garden.

Opened in 1867, late in the regime of Napoleon III, it was built according to plans by Adolphe Alphand, who created all the major parks for Haussmann's renovation of Paris commanded by the Emperor. The park has 5.5 kilometres (3.4 miles) of roads and 2.2 kilometres (1.4 miles) of paths. Its best known feature is the Temple de la Sibylle (Sibyl's Temple), a miniature Roman temple inspired by the Temple of Vesta in Tivoli, Italy, and located on the Belvedere island in the artificial lake, at the top of a 50-metre (160 ft) cliff.

== History ==
Map of the Parc des Buttes Chaumont

The park took its name from the bleak hill which formerly occupied the site; because of the chemical composition of its soil, the hill was almost bare of vegetation and was called Chauve-mont, 'bare hill'. The area, just outside the limits of Paris until the mid-19th century, had a sinister reputation; it was the site of the Gibbet of Montfaucon, where from the 13th century until 1760, the bodies of hanged criminals were displayed after their executions. After the 1789 Revolution, it became a refuse dump, and then a place for cutting up horse carcasses and a depository for sewage. The director of public works of Paris and builder of the park, Adolphe Alphand, reported that "the site spread infectious emanations not only to the neighbouring areas, but, following the direction of the wind, over the entire city."

Another part of the site was a quarry that produced limestone and gypsum, used in the production of plaster and lime. In order to make lime, the gypsum was heated in furnaces. The mining and heating continued until the late 1850s, when the quarry was exhausted. The quarry also yielded Eocene mammal fossils, including Palaeotherium, which were studied by Georges Cuvier.

Baron Haussmann, the Prefect of Paris, selected this unprepossessing site for the new public park to serve the rapidly growing population of the new 19th and 20th arrondissements of Paris, which had been annexed to the city in 1860.

Work began in 1864, under the direction of Alphand, who used all the experience and lessons he had learned in making the Bois de Boulogne and the Bois de Vincennes. Two years were required simply to terrace the land. Then a railroad track was laid to bring in cars carrying two hundred thousand cubic meters of topsoil. A thousand workers remade the landscape, digging a lake and shaping the lawns and hillsides. Explosives were used to sculpt the buttes themselves and the former quarry into a picturesque mountain fifty meters high with cliffs, an interior grotto, pinnacles and arches. Hydraulic pumps were installed to lift water from the canal of the Ourcq River to the highest point on the promontory, to create a dramatic waterfall.

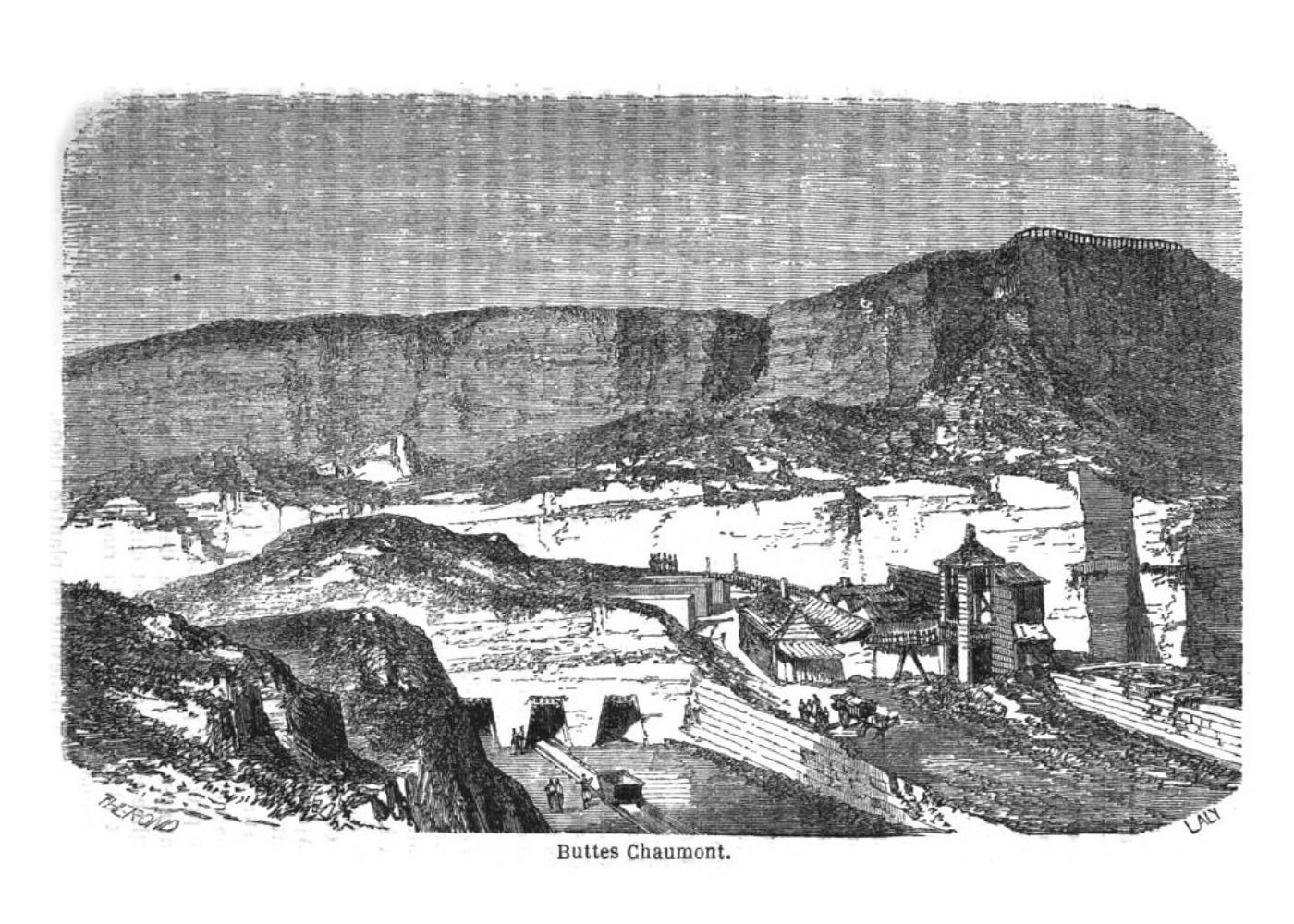
The quarries which occupied part of the site (1864)

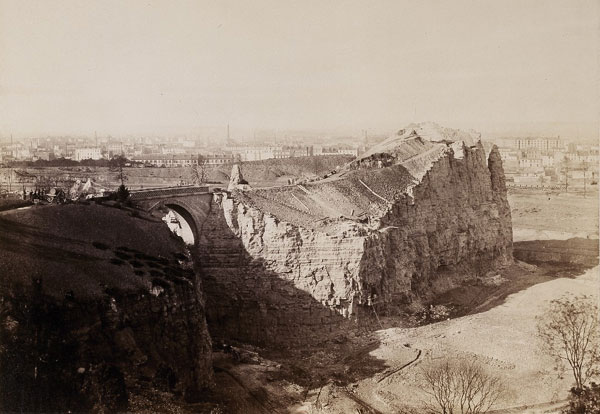
The park under construction (1864–1867)

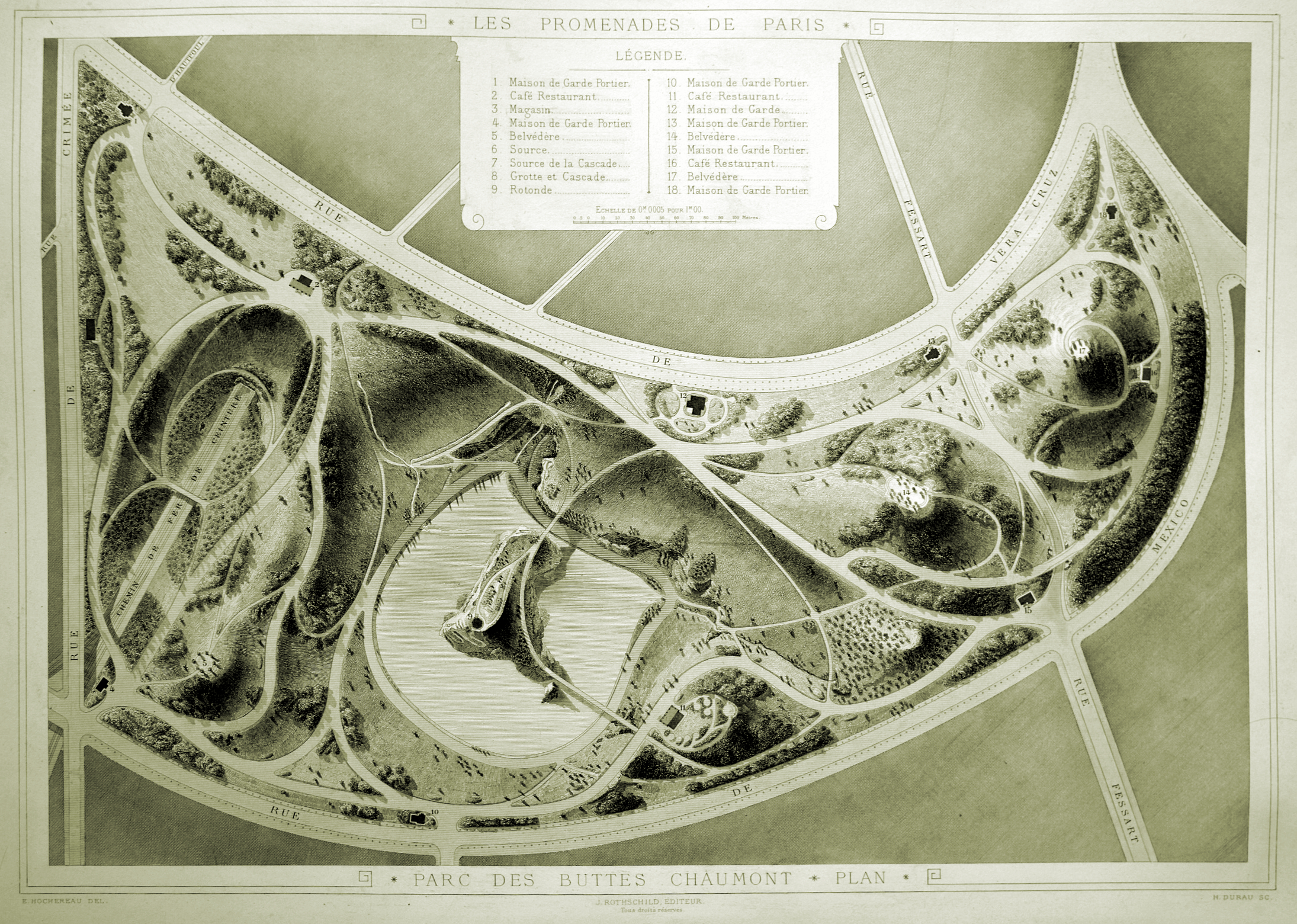
Map of the park at the time of its opening in 1867

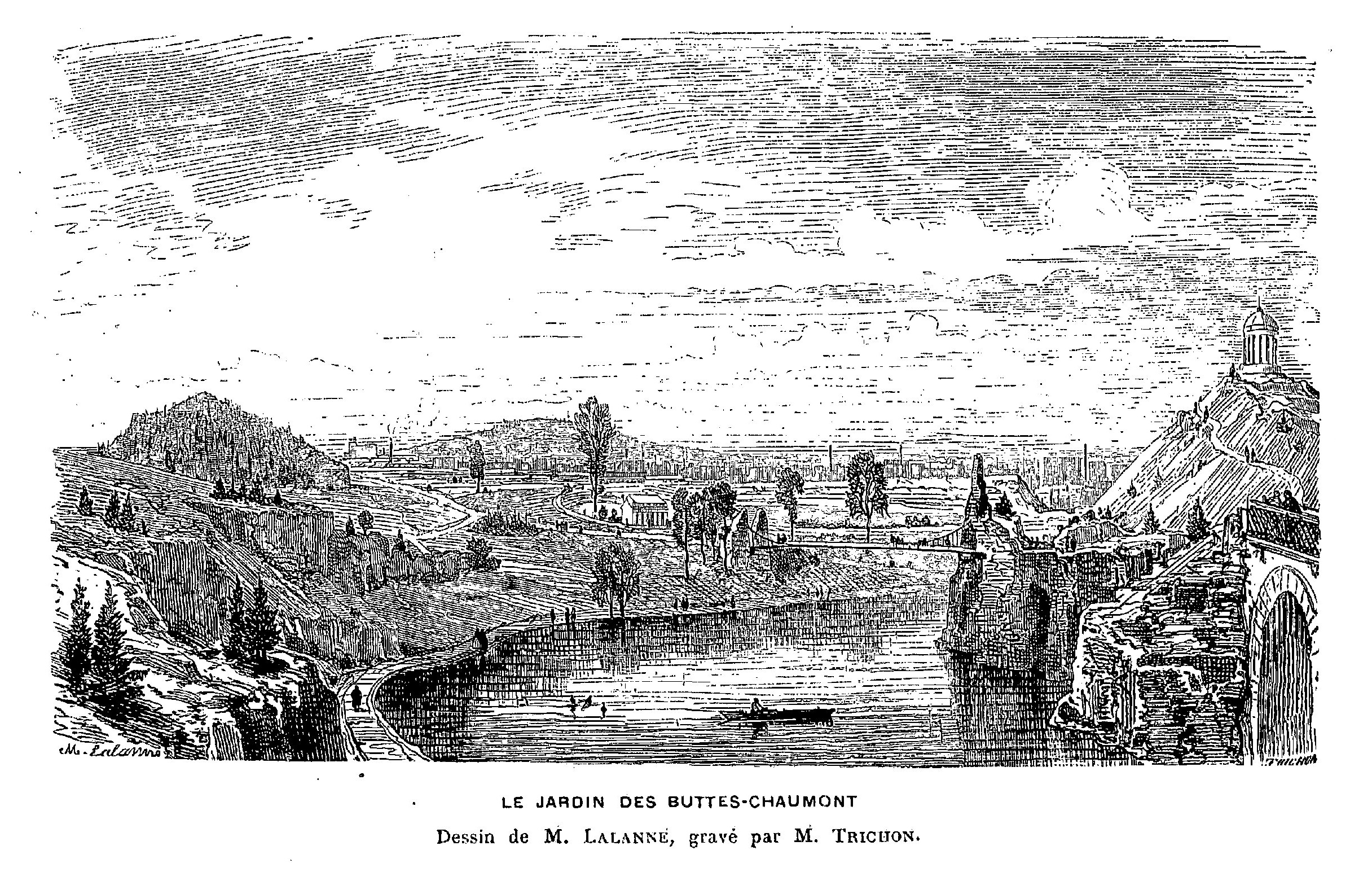
The park when it opened in 1867

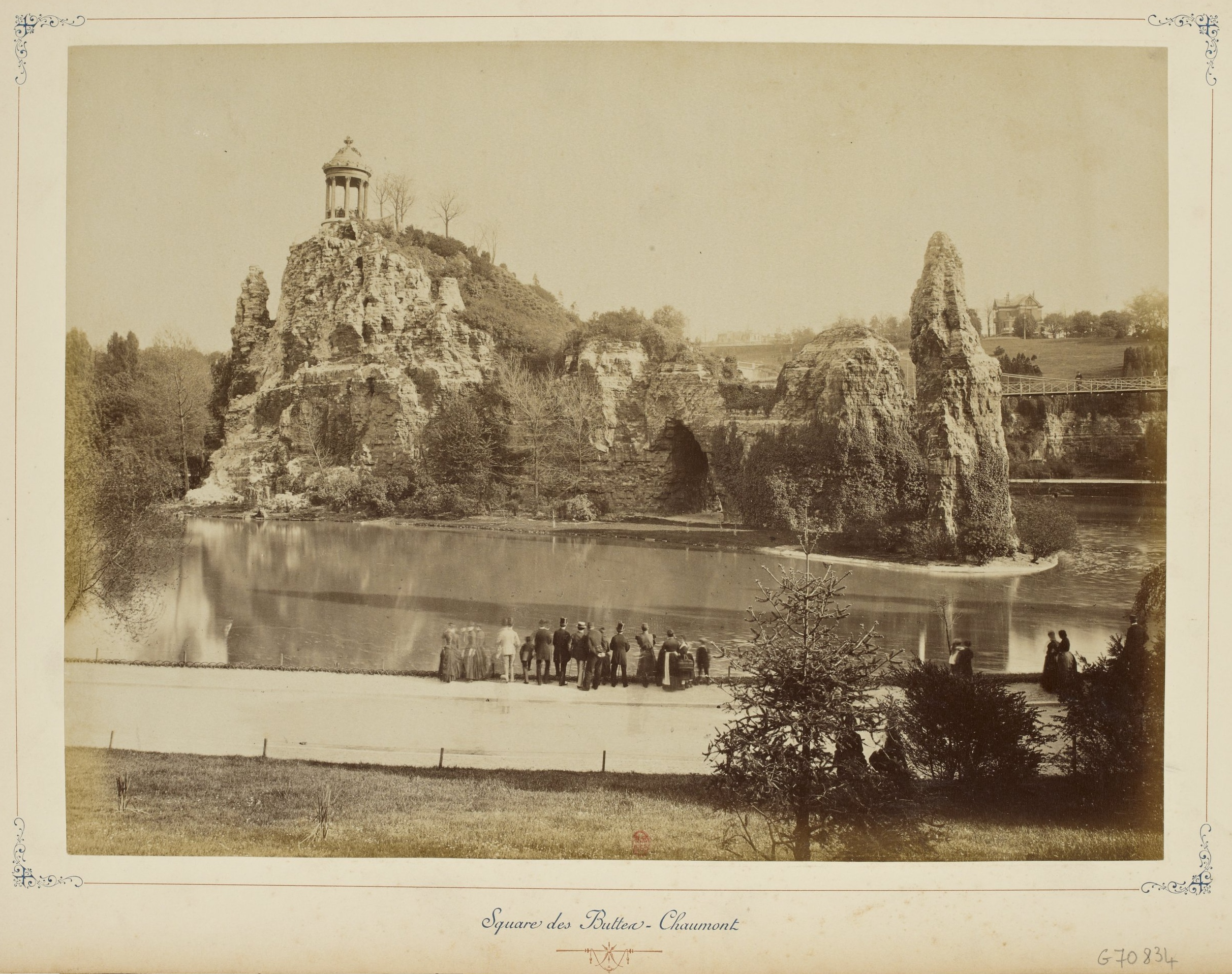
The Belvedere island in 1890–1900

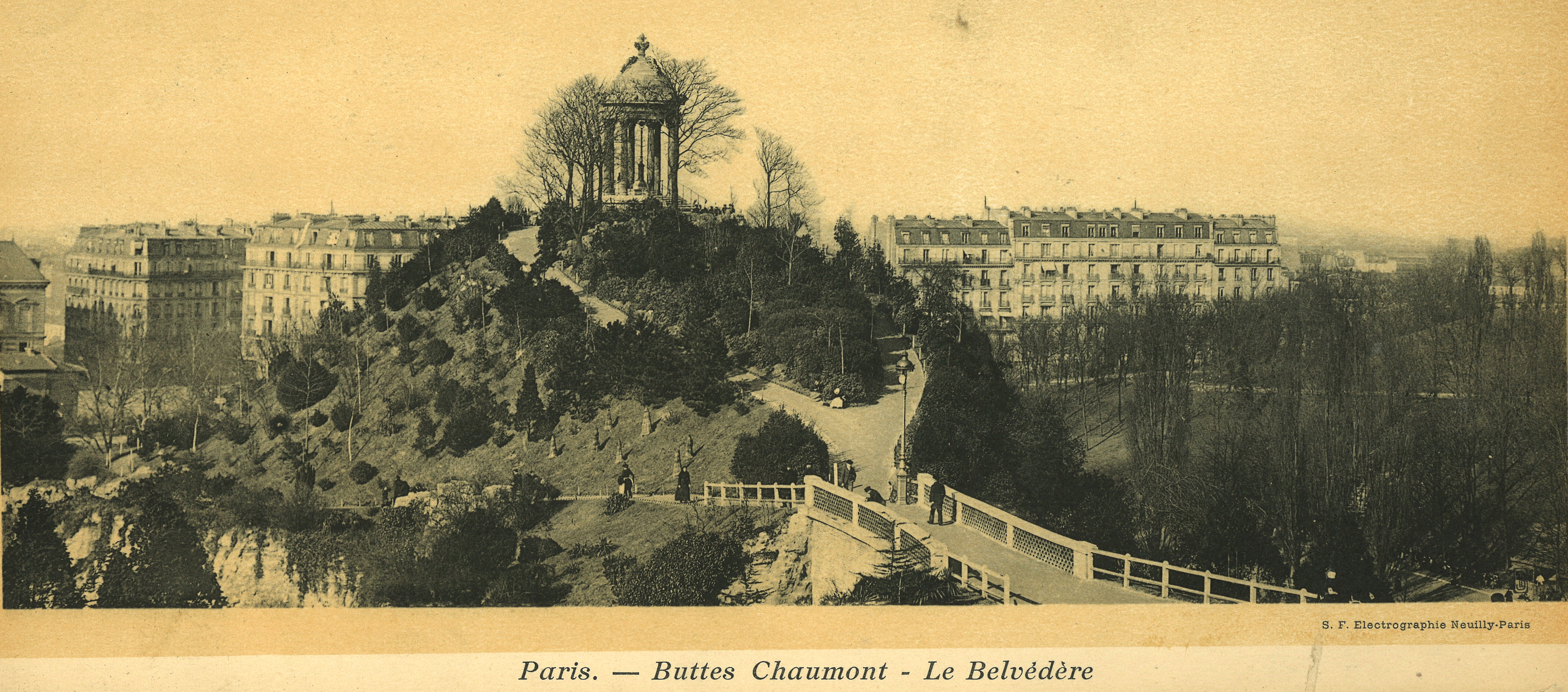
The Belvedere island, c. 1900

The chief gardener of Paris, horticulturist Jean-Pierre Barillet-Deschamps, then went to work, planting thousands of trees, shrubs and flowers and creating sloping lawns. At the same time, the city's chief architect, Gabriel Davioud, designed the Temple de la Sibylle, the miniature Roman temple on the top of the promontory, modeled after that at Tivoli near Rome, as well as belvederes, restaurants modeled after Swiss chalets, and gatehouses like rustic cottages, completing the imaginary landscape. The park opened on 1 April 1867, coinciding with the opening of the Paris Universal Exposition.

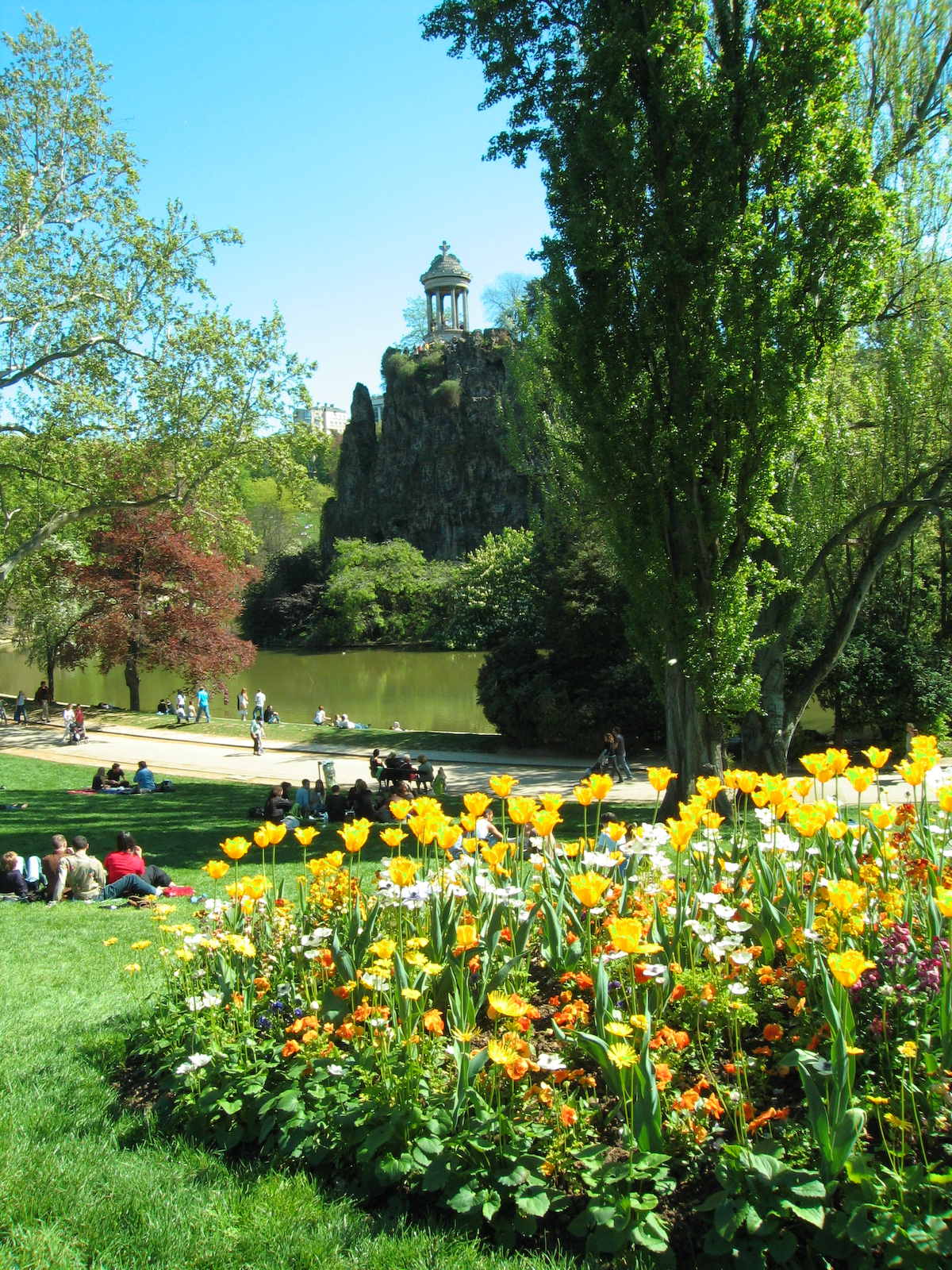
The park and the Temple de la Sibylle

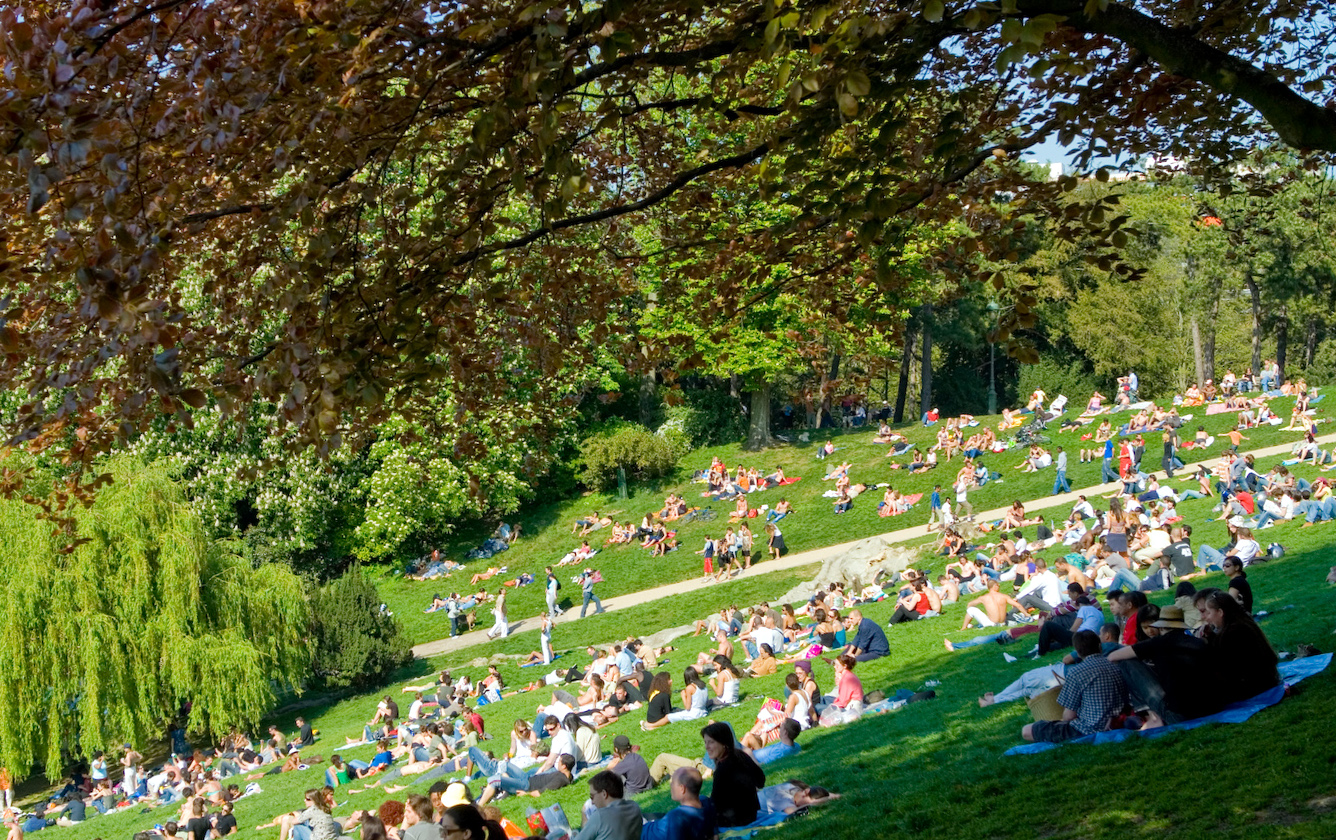
The park on a sunny afternoon

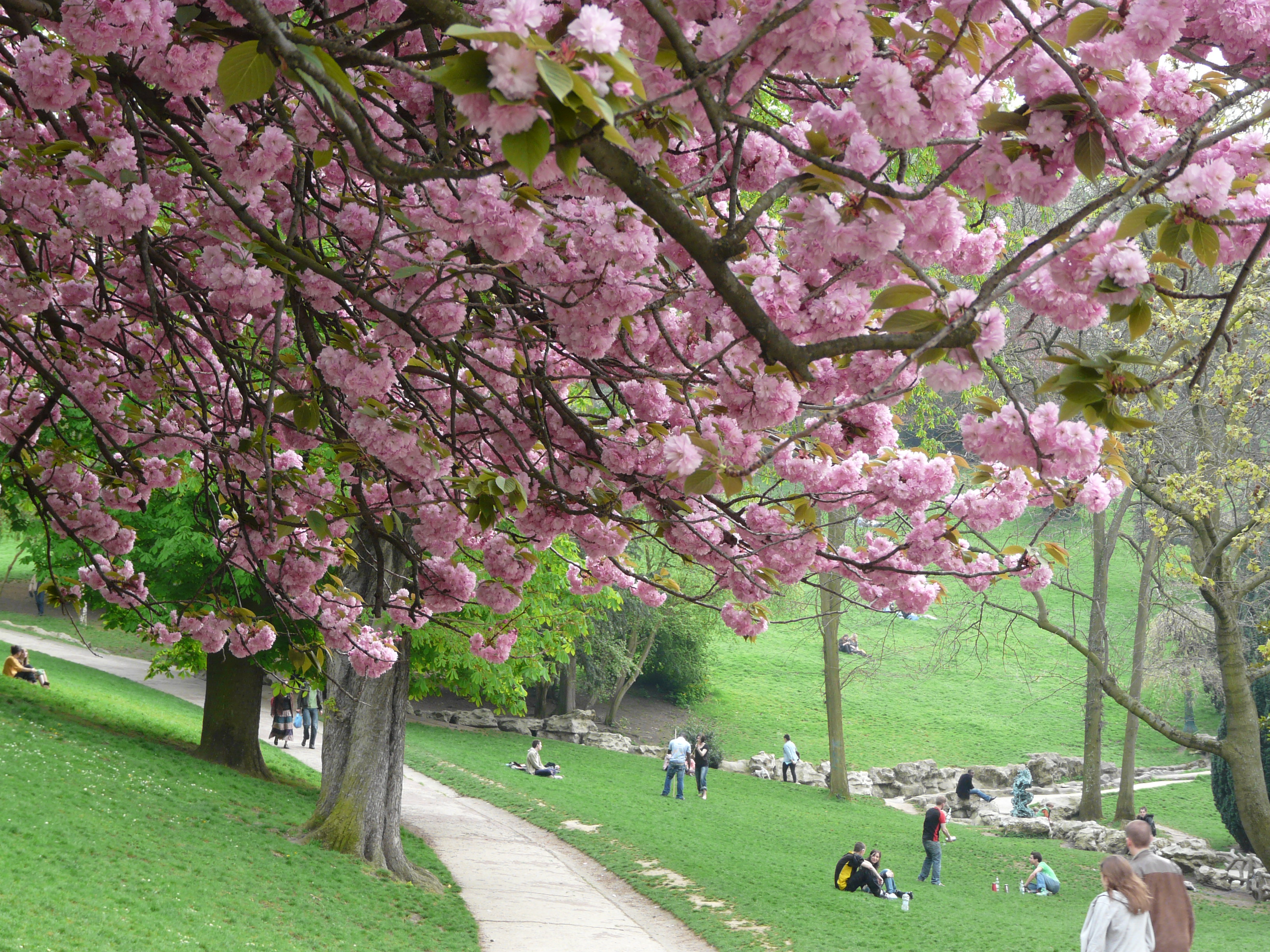
Flowering cherry trees

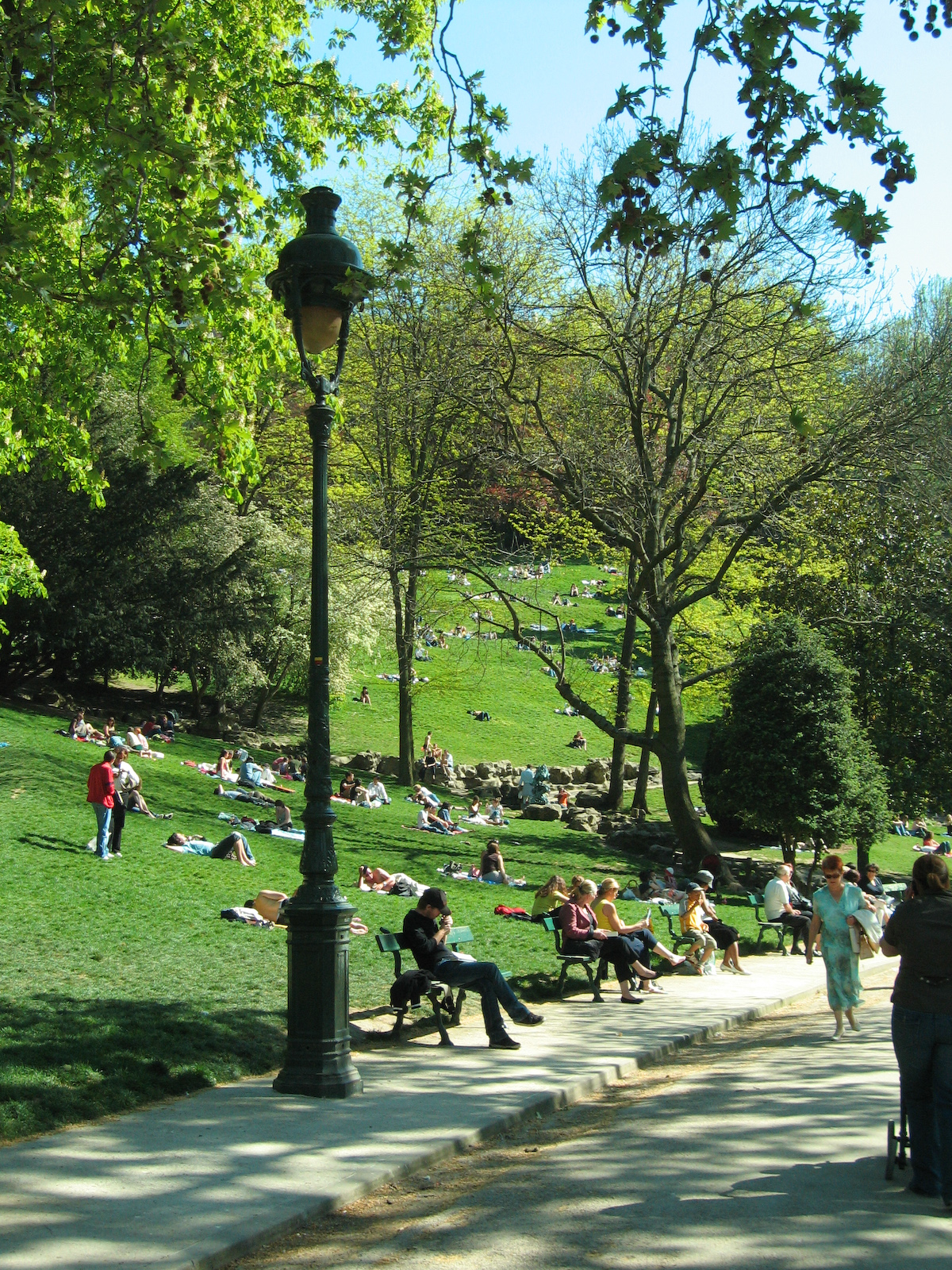
The main promenade

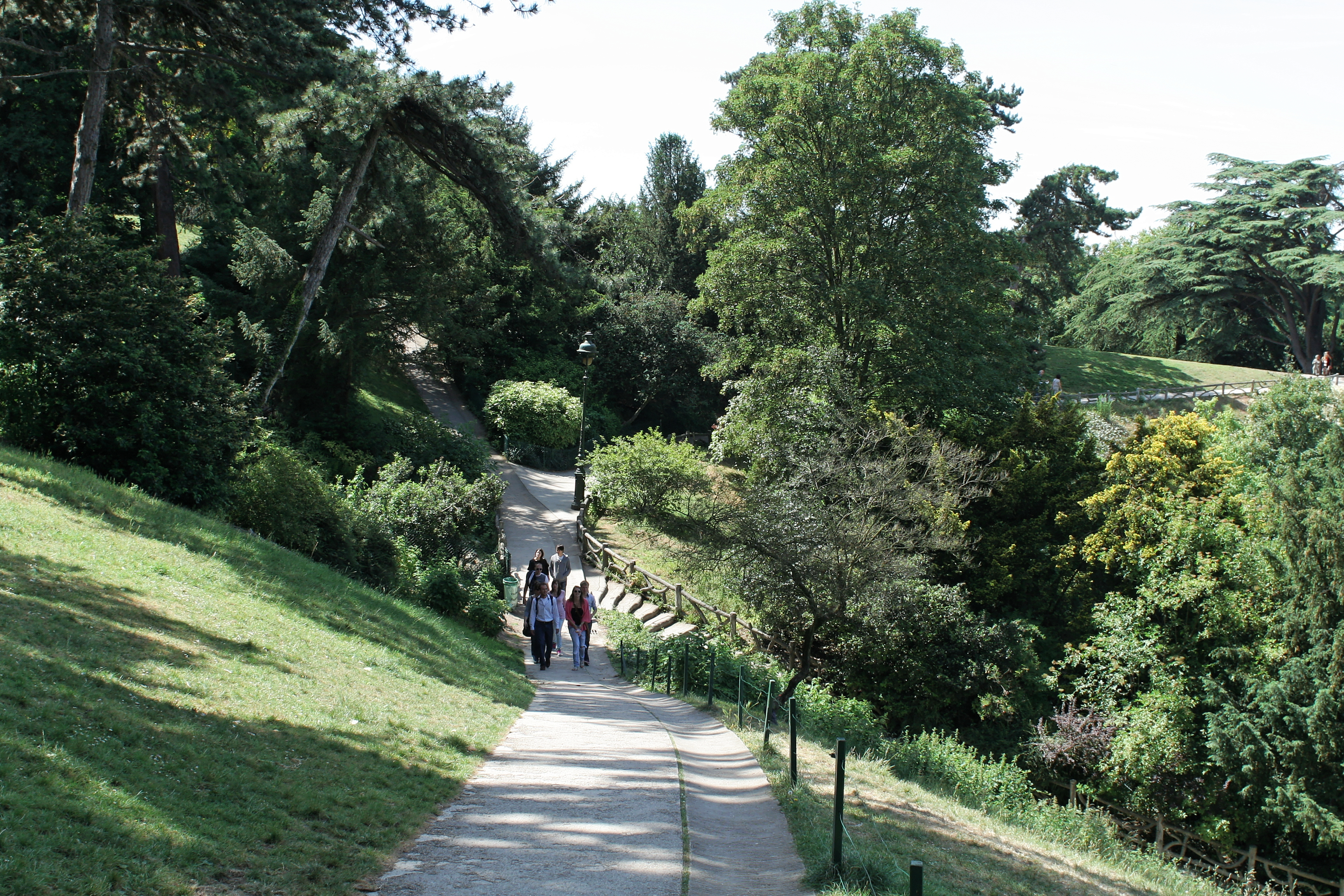
A pathway through the park

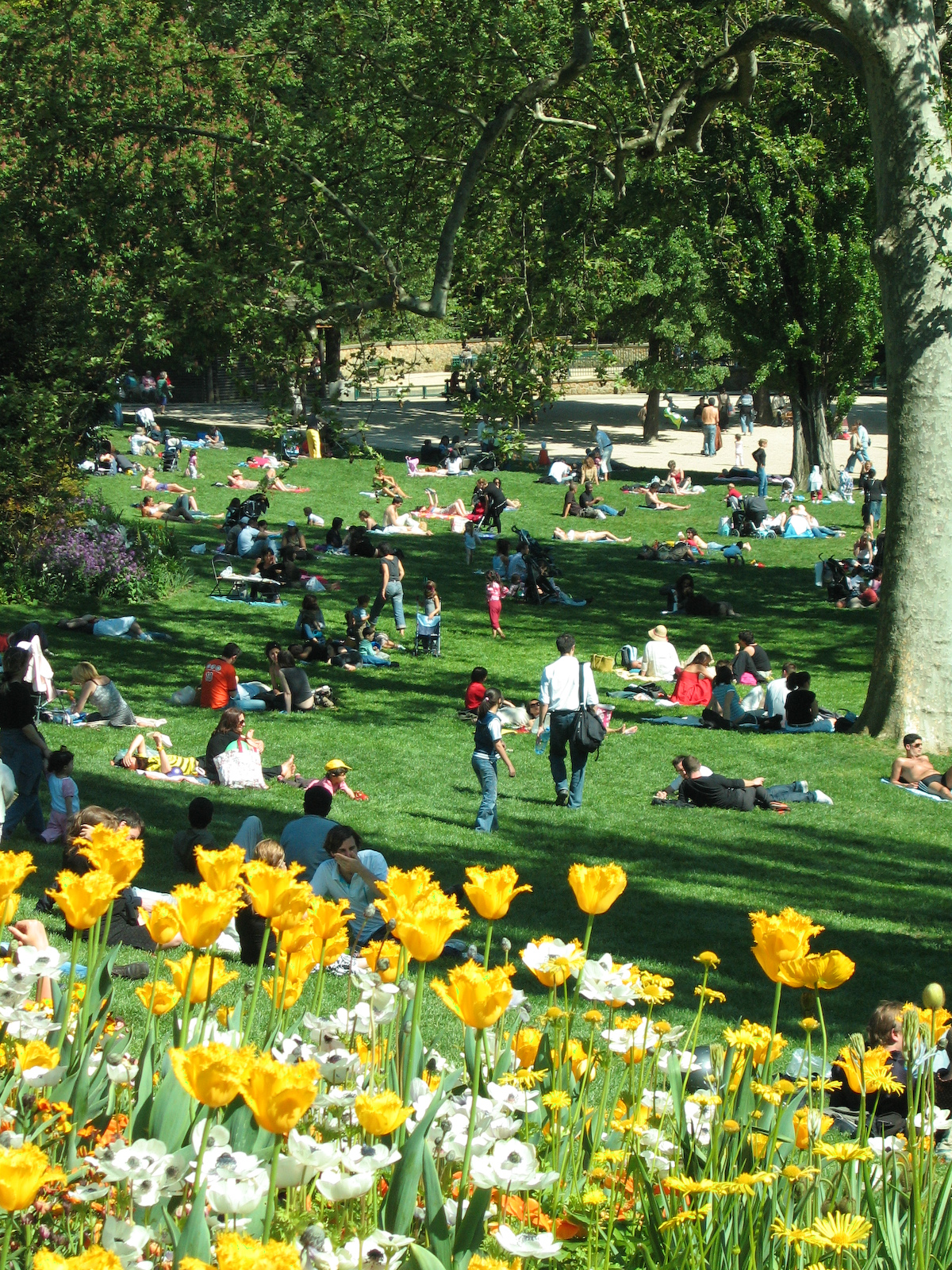
The sloping lawns, a popular gathering place on weekends

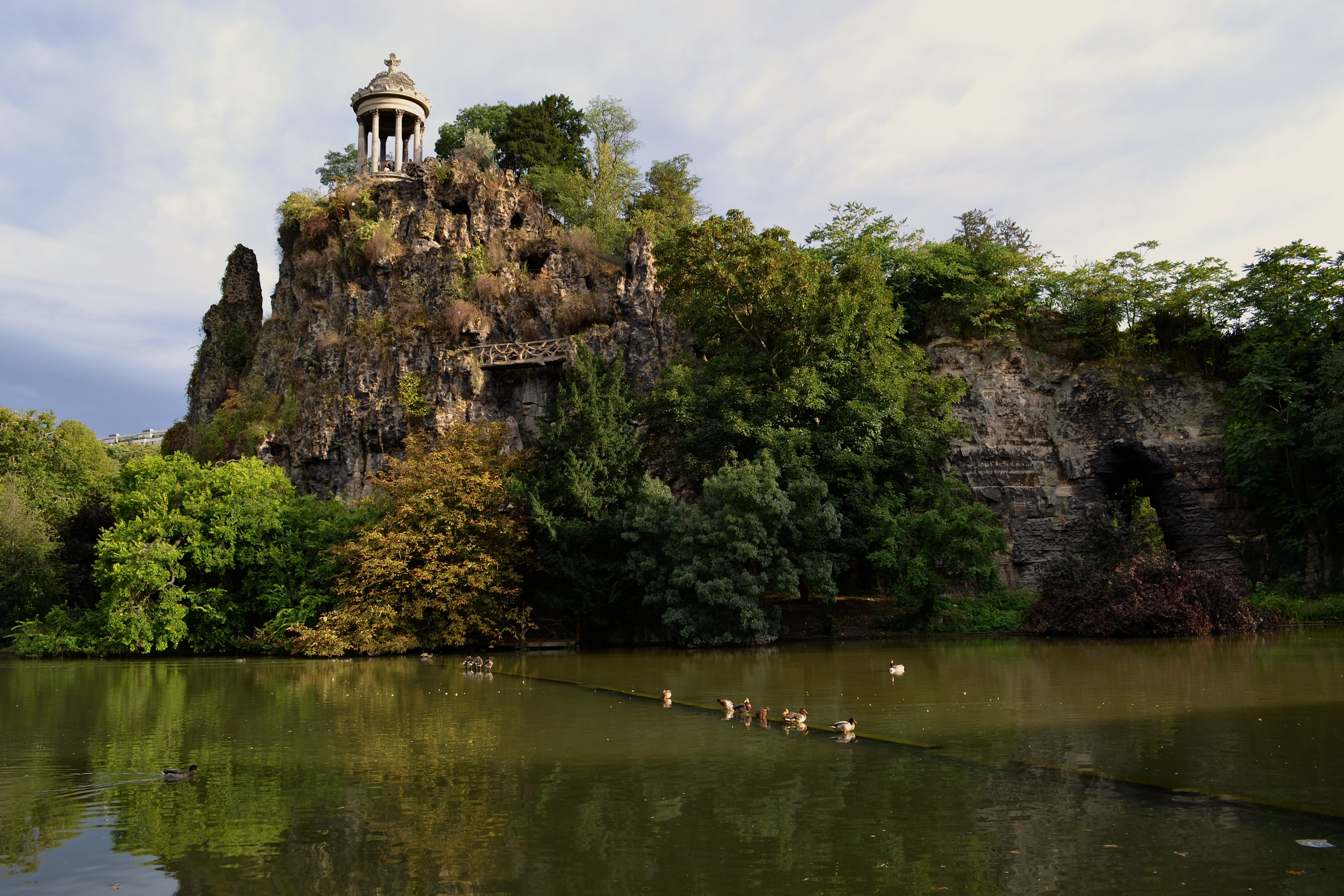
Temple de la Sibylle from the lake shore

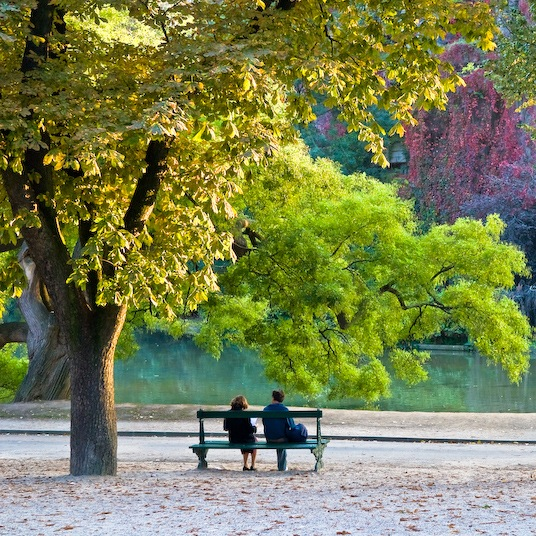
Park scene

== Features ==
=== Lake and Belvedere island ===
The heart of the park is an artificial lake of 1.5 hectares (3.7 acres) surrounding the Île de la Belvédère (Belvedere island), a rocky island with steep cliffs created from the old gypsum quarry. At the top of the cliffs is the Temple de la Sibylle, fifty meters above the lake. Two bridges cross the lake to the island. Paths encircle the island, and a steep stairway of 173 steps leads from the top of the cliffs down through the grotto to the edge of the lake.

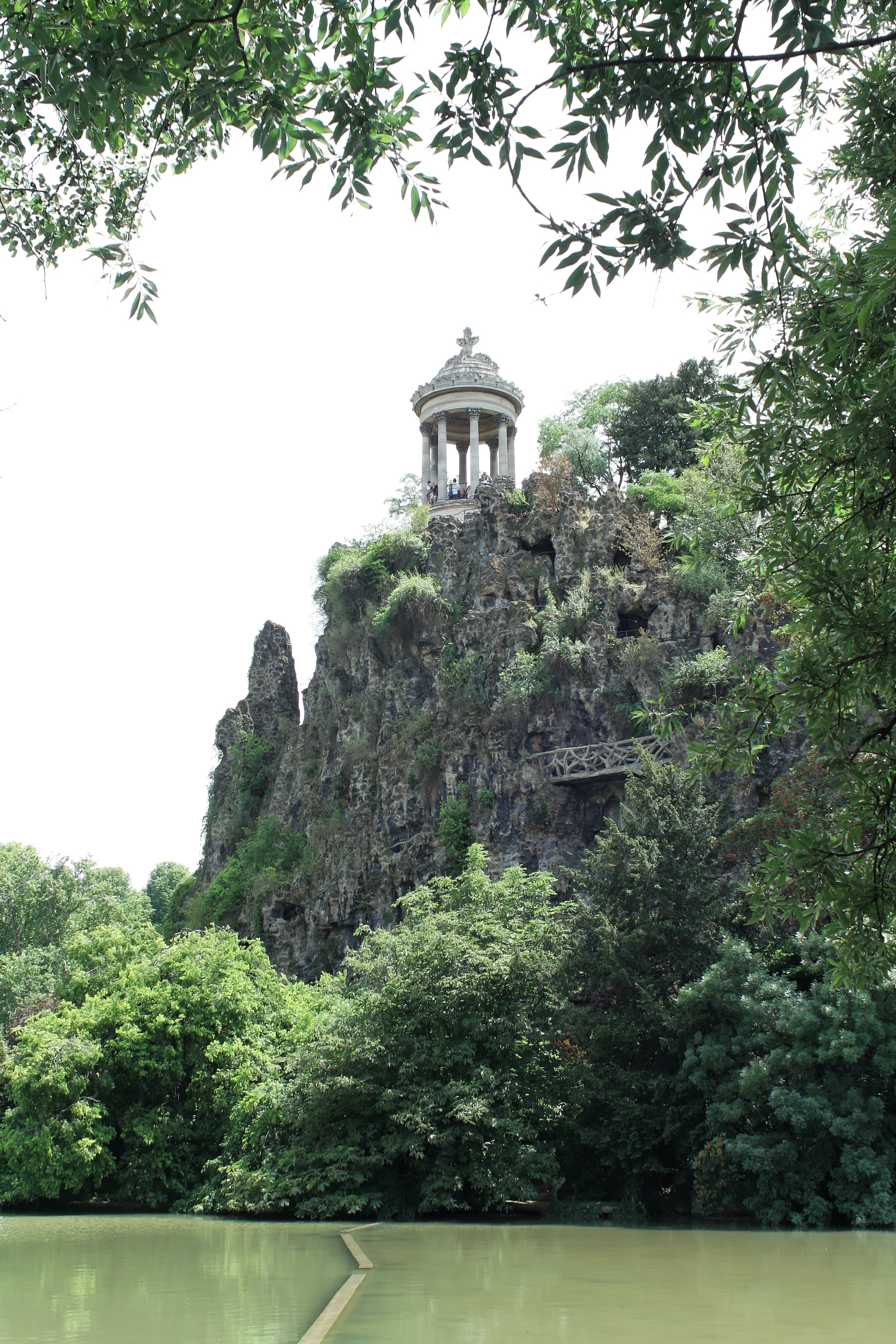
The temple on the summit of the Belvedere island.

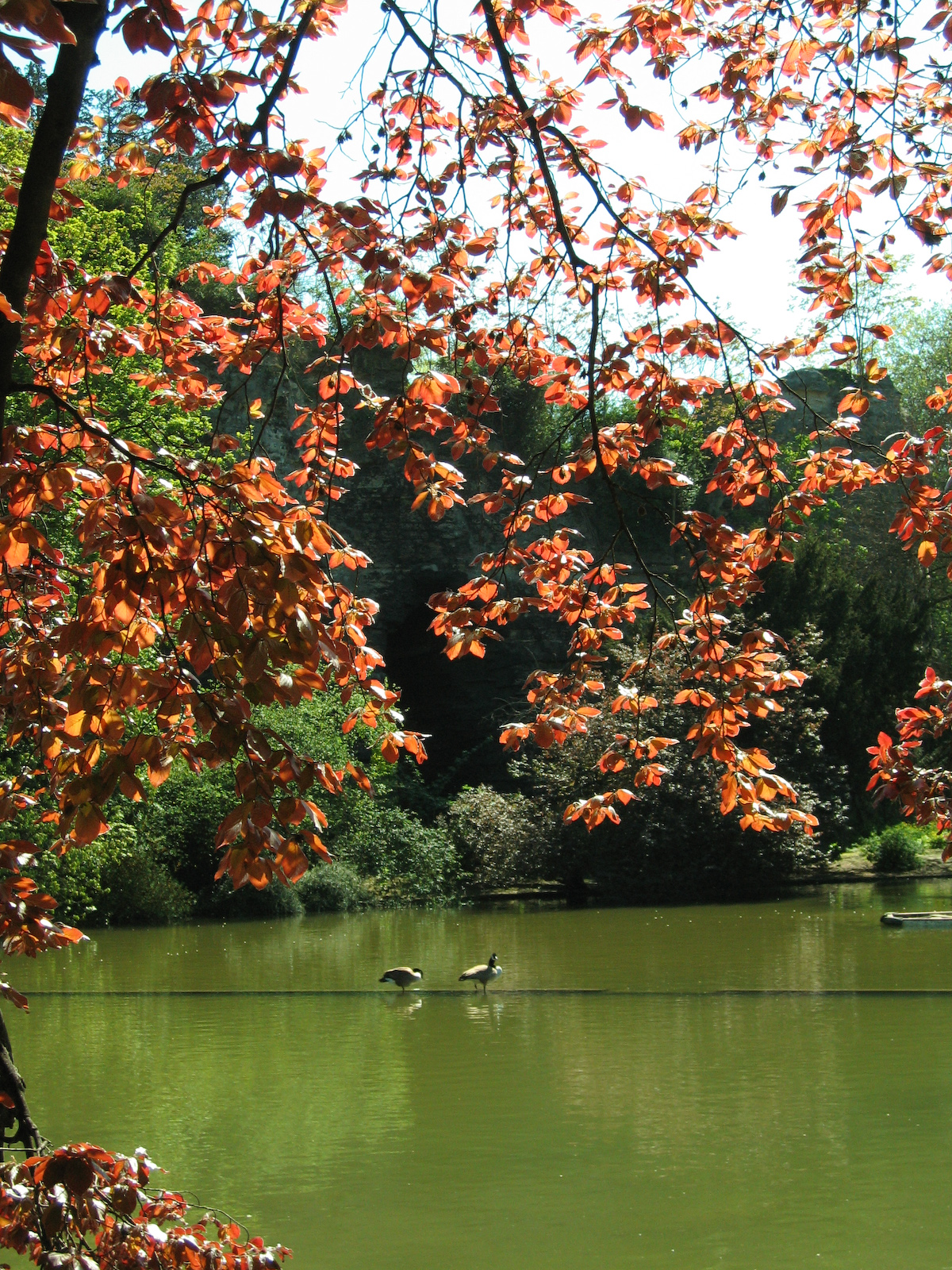
The artificial lake seen from the top of the island.

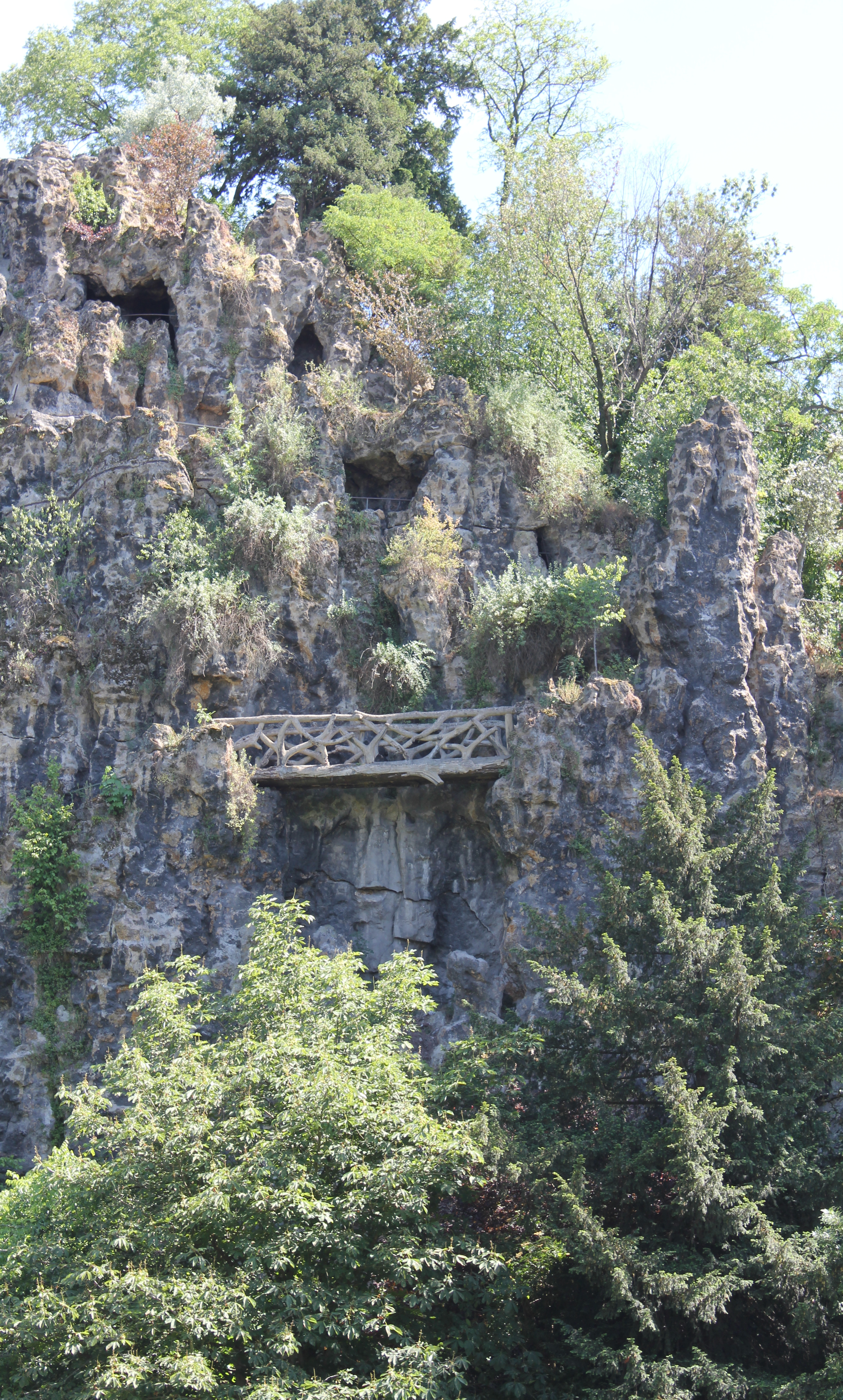
A cement bridge on the path around the island.

=== Temple de la Sibylle ===
The most famous feature of the park is the Temple de la Sibylle, a miniature version of the ancient Roman Temple of Vesta in Tivoli, Italy. The original temple was the subject of many romantic landscape paintings from the 17th to the 19th century, and inspired similar architectural follies in the English landscape garden of the 18th century. The miniature was designed by Gabriel Davioud, the city architect for Paris, who also designed picturesque monuments for the Bois de Boulogne, Bois de Vincennes, Parc Monceau, and other city parks as well as some of the most famous fountains of Paris, including the Fontaine Saint-Michel. The temple was finished in 1867.

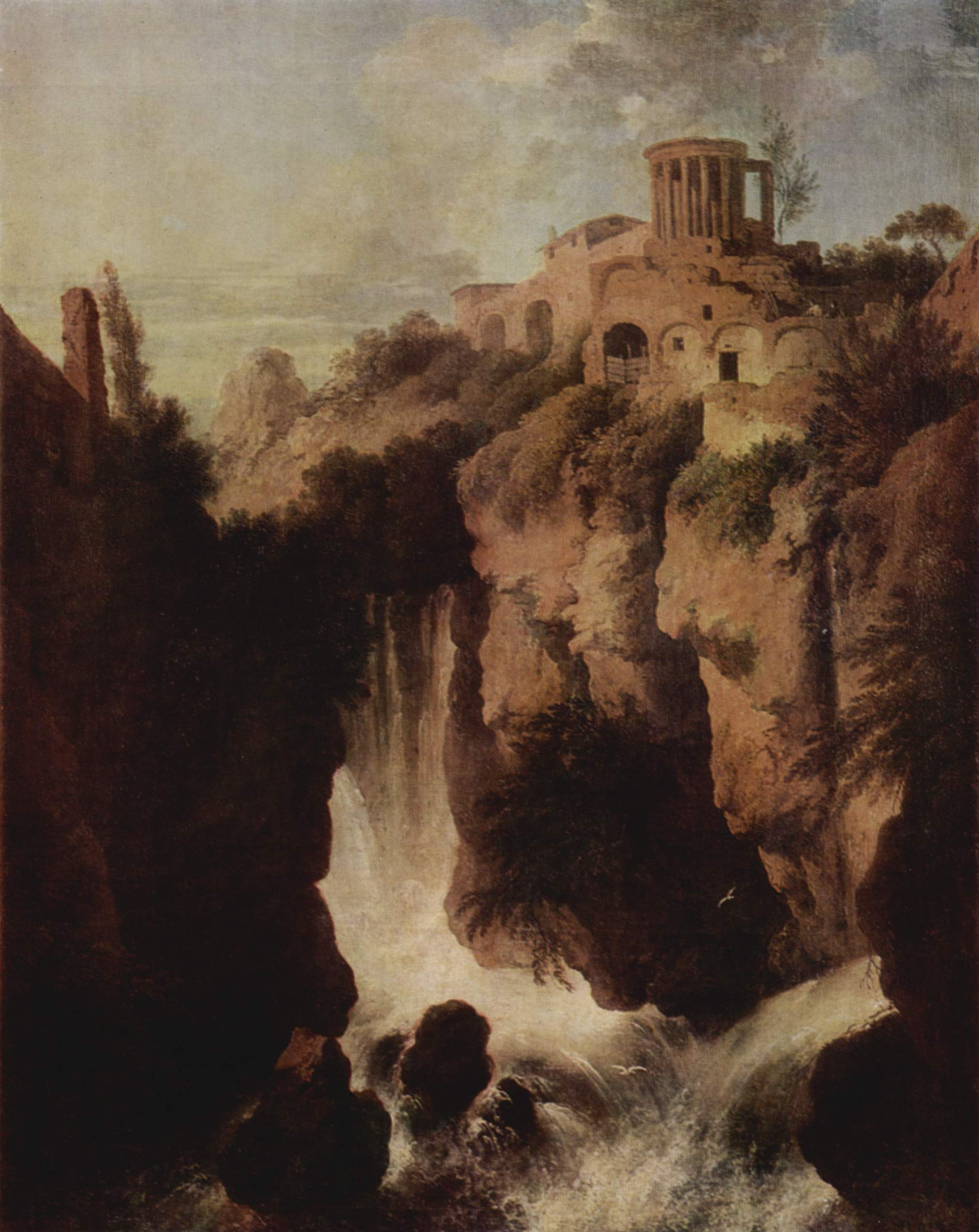
The Temple of Vesta in Tivoli, Italy, was the subject of many romantic landscape paintings in the 18th and 19th centuries. This one is by Christian Dietrich, from about 1750.

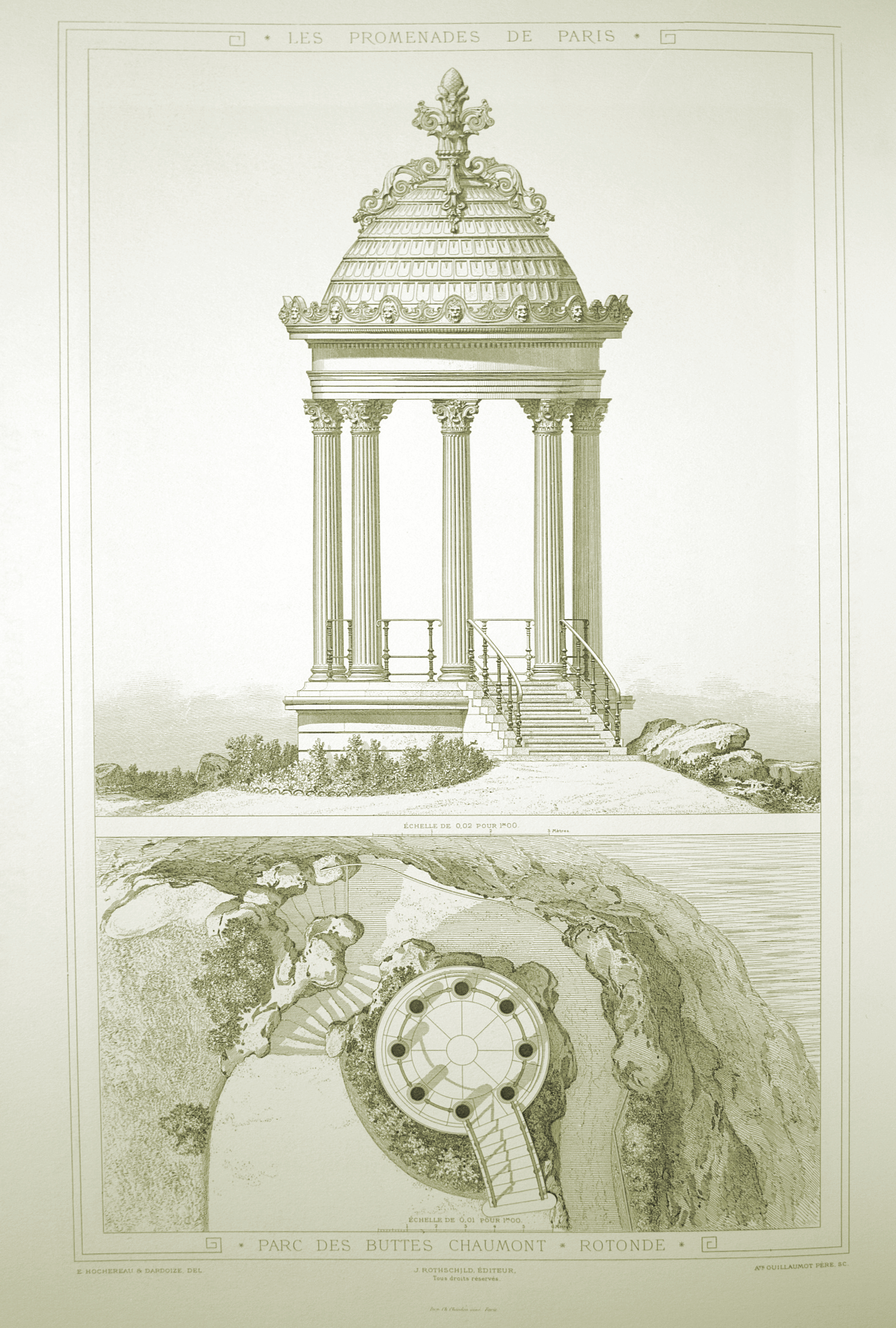
Davioud's design for the Temple de la Sibylle, based on the Temple of Vesta

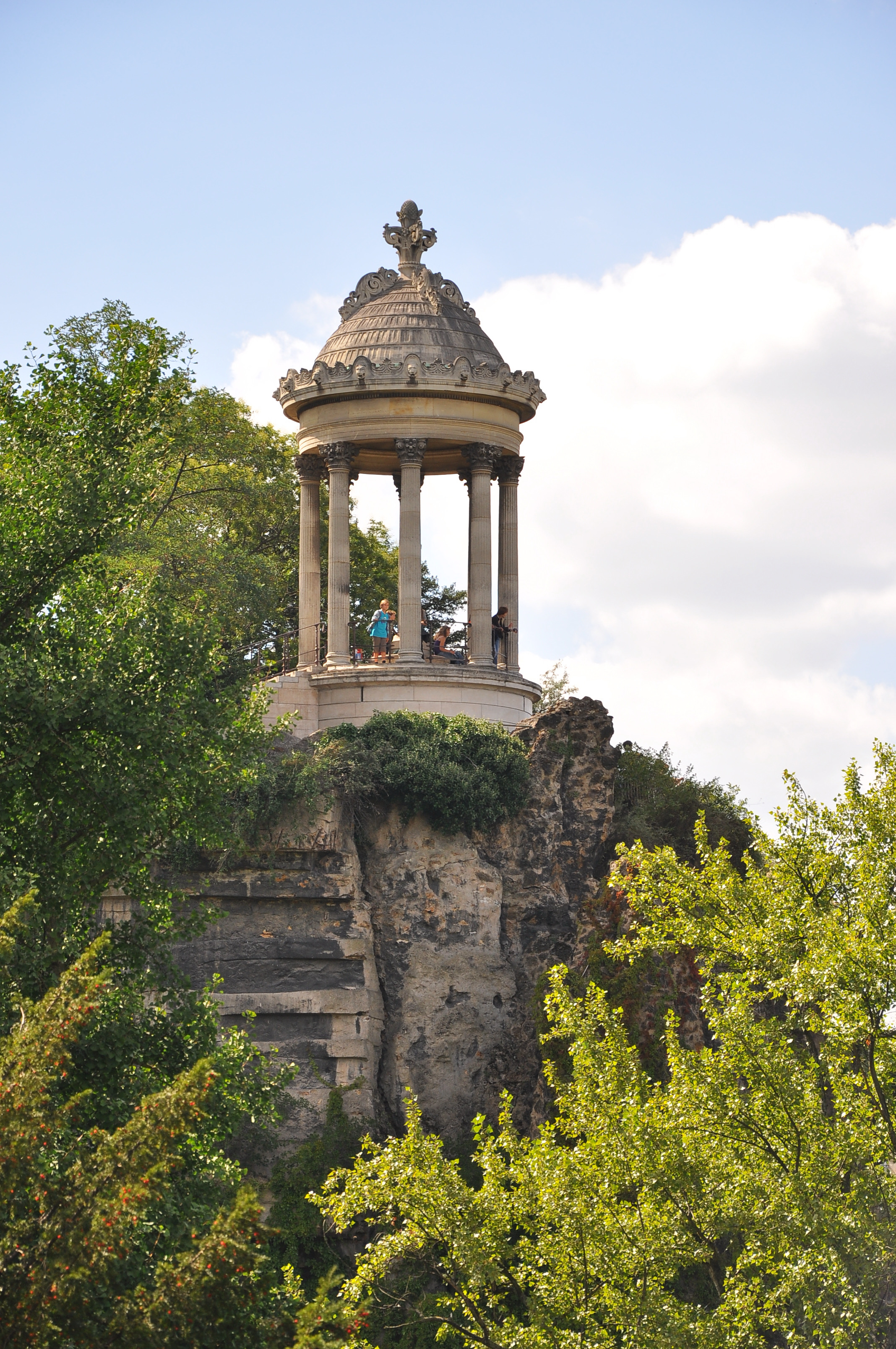
Davioud's Temple de la Sibylle (1867)

=== Grotto and waterfalls ===
The grotto is a vestige of the old gypsum and limestone quarry that occupied part of the site, now adjacent to rue Botzaris on the south side of the park. It is fourteen meters wide and twenty meters high, and has been sculpted and decorated with artificial stalactites as long as eight meters to make it resemble a natural grotto, in the style of the romantic English landscape garden of the 18th and 19th century. An artificial waterfall, fed by pumps, cascades from the top of the grotto down into the lake.

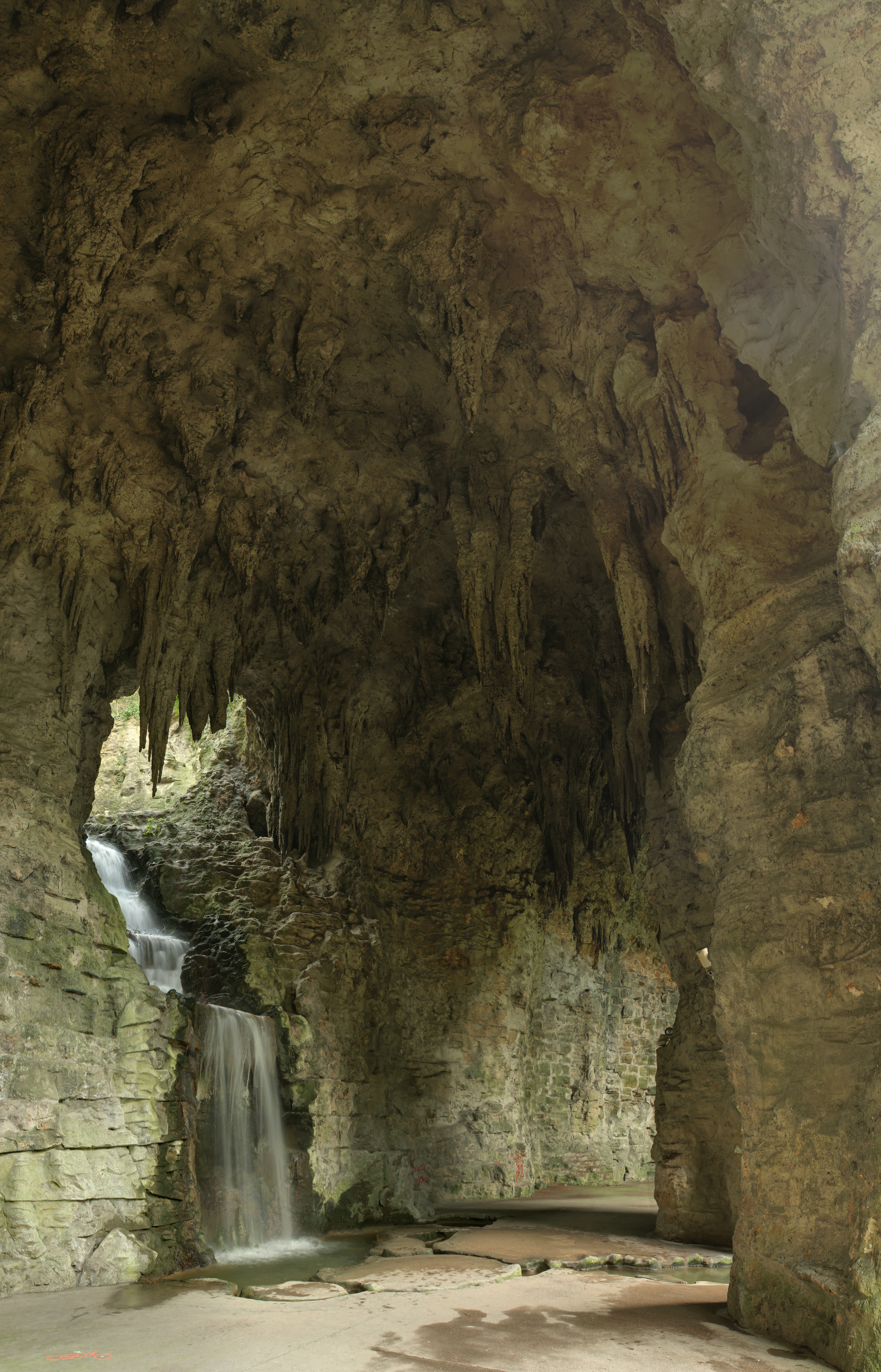
A gallery of the former quarry has been transformed into a grotto with a 20-meter high artificial waterfall.

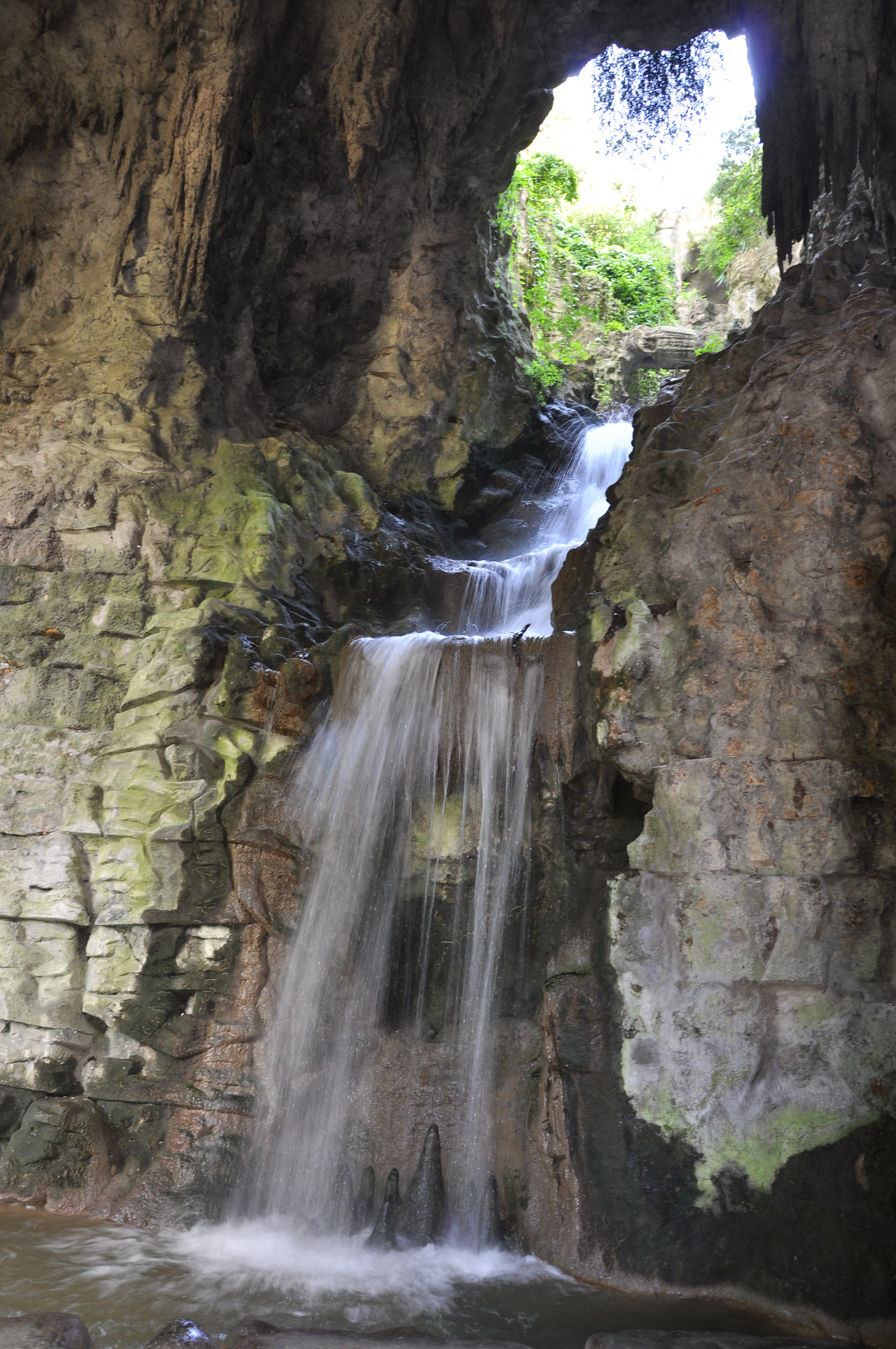
The waterfall within the grotto

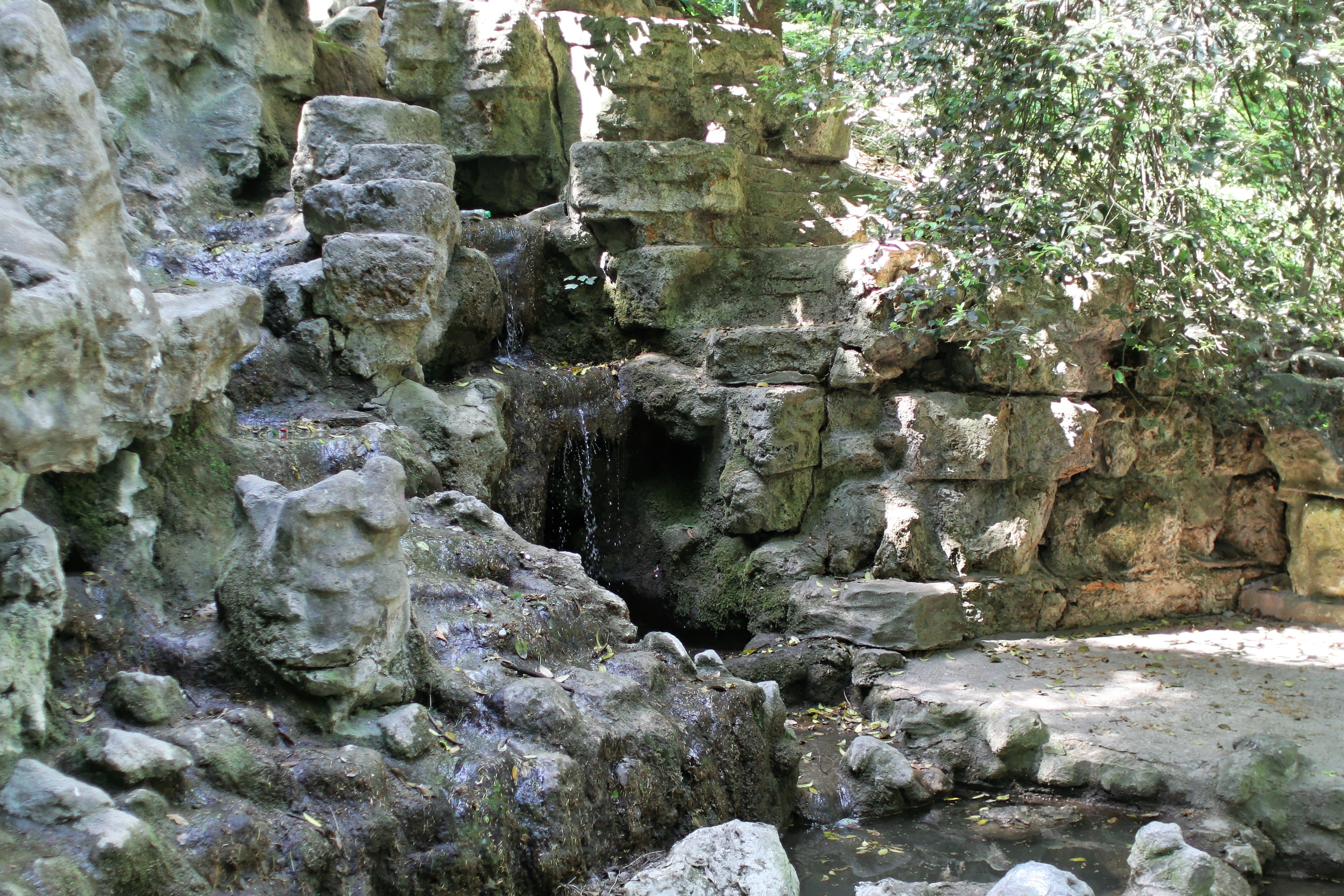
The petite cascade, a small artificial waterfall

=== Bridges ===
Two bridges cross the lake to the Belvedere island. A 63-metre (207 ft) suspension bridge, 8 metres (26 ft) above the lake, was designed by Gustave Eiffel, the creator of the Eiffel Tower. The other bridge, a 12-metre (39 ft) masonry bridge, 22 metres (72 ft) above the lake, came to be known as the "suicide bridge" and is now fenced with wire mesh.

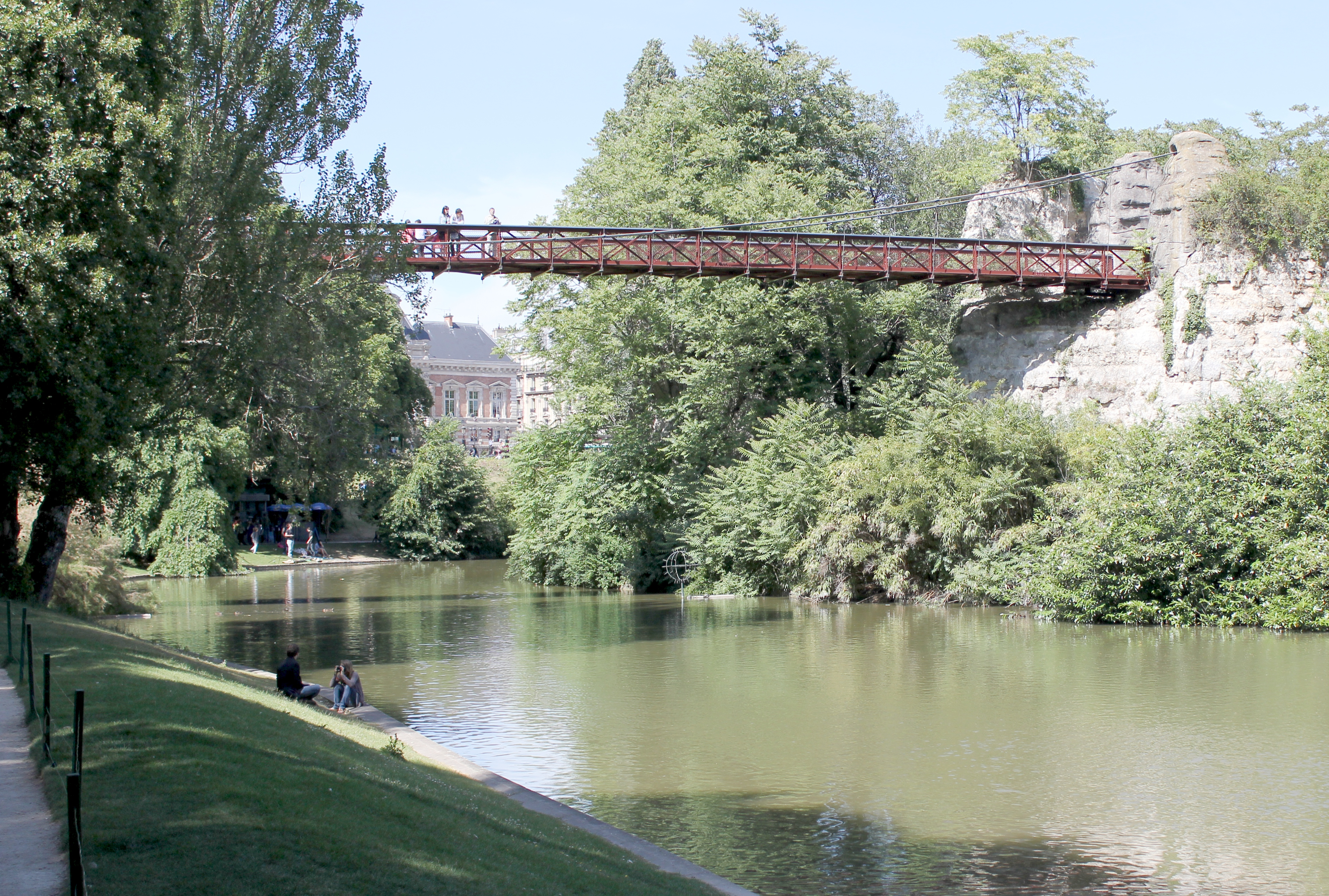
Suspension bridge to Belvedere island, designed by Gustave Eiffel in 1867

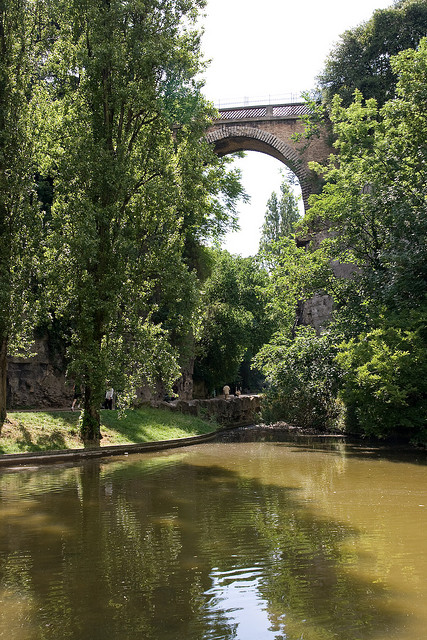
So-called suicide bridge to Belvedere island

=== Architecture ===
Most of the architecture of the park, from the Temple de la Sibylle, the cafes, and gatehouses to the fences and rain shelters, was designed by Gabriel Davioud, chief architect for the city of Paris. He created a picturesque, rustic style for the parks of Paris, sometimes inspired by ancient Rome, sometimes by the chalets and bridges of the Swiss Alps.

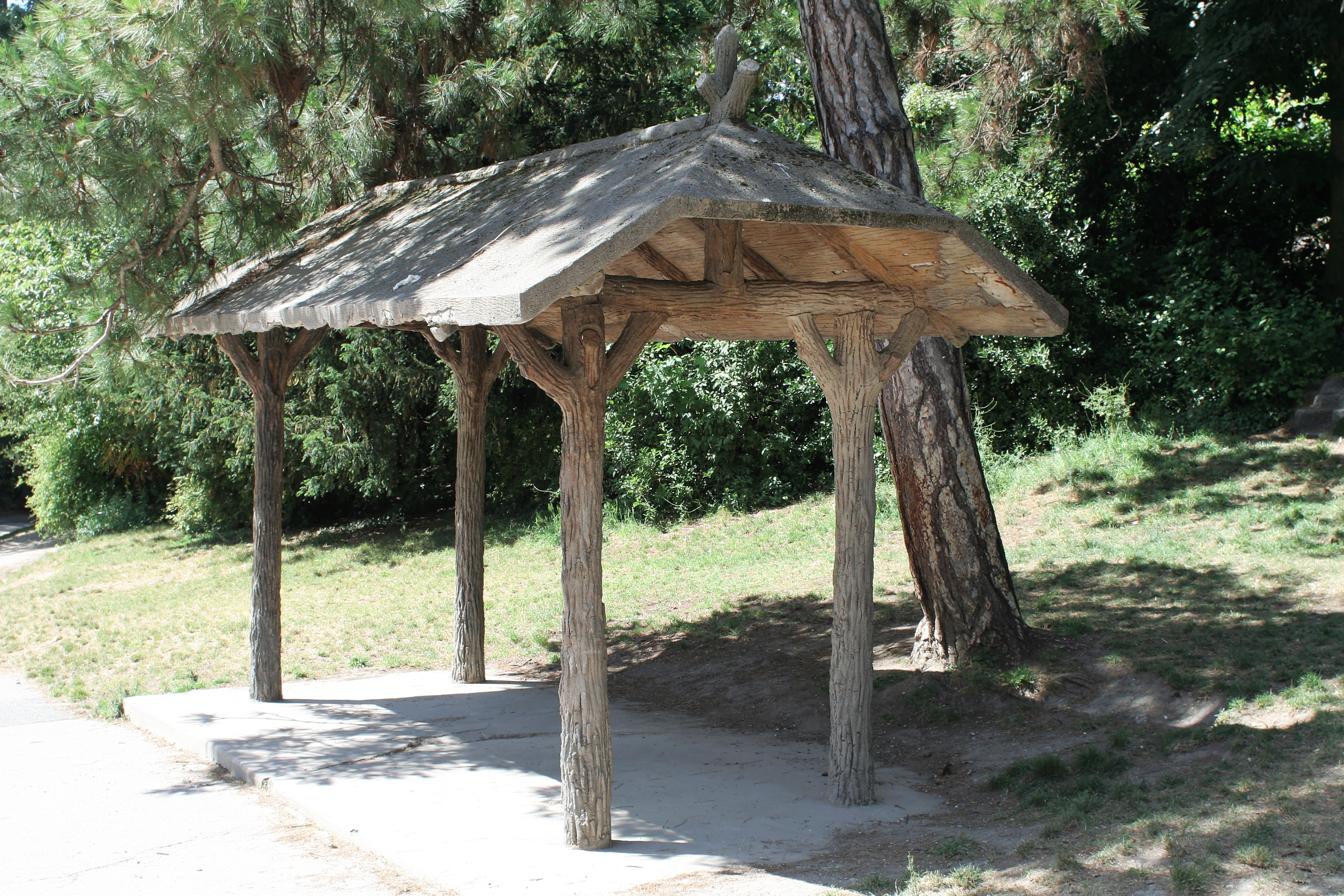
A rain shelter, made of concrete hand-sculpted to look like wood, a technique known as faux bois

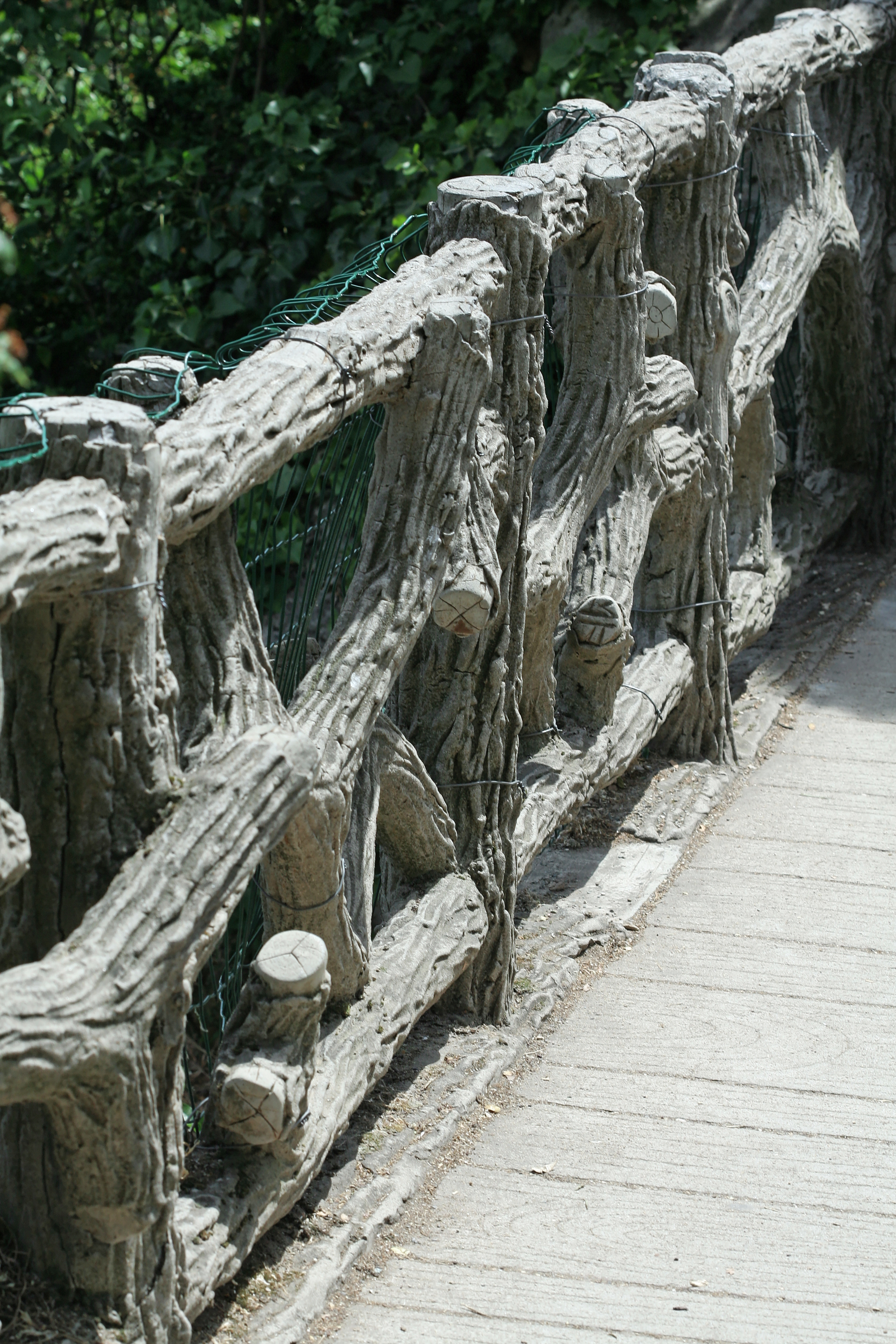
Davioud's paths on the Belvedere feature handrails made of hand-crafted concrete faux bois.

The main entrance to the park is at Place Armand-Carrel, which is also the location of the mairie (town hall) of the 19th arrondissement, also designed by Davioud. The park has five other large entrances — Porte Bolivar, Porte de la Villette, Porte Secrétan, Porte de Crimée, and Porte Fessart — and seven smaller gates.

As of 2019, the park has three restaurants (Pavillon du Lac, Pavillon Puebla, and Rosa Bonheur), two reception halls, two Guignol theatres, and two waffle stands. The Guignol theatres were established in 1892.

The park has four Wi-Fi zones as part of a citywide wireless Internet access plan.

== Flora ==
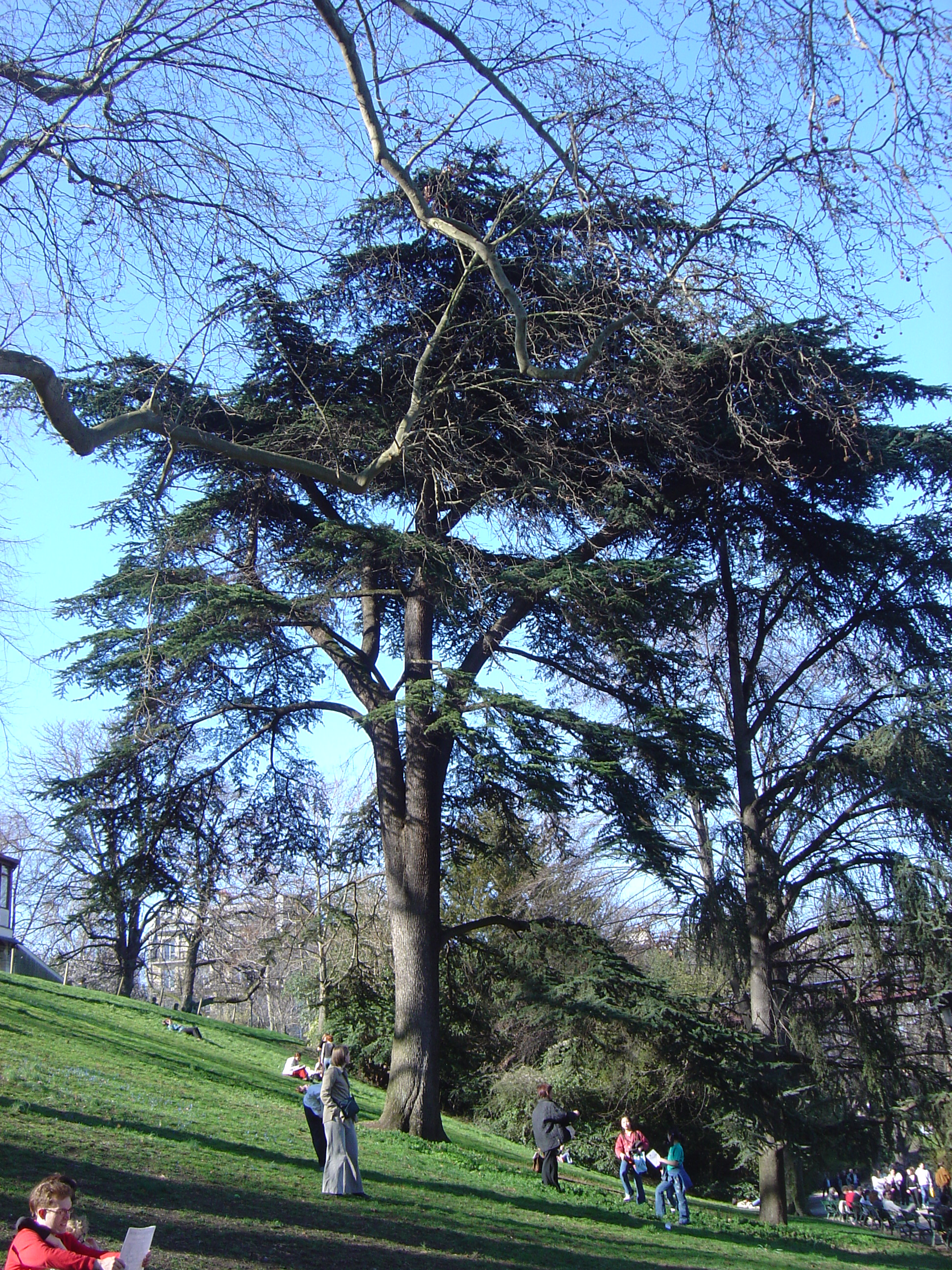
Cedar of Lebanon (Cedrus libani) in the Parc des Buttes Chaumont

The park was envisioned by Napoleon III as a garden showcase, a vision that continues to guide the park's direction. More than 47 species of plants, trees, and shrubs are cultivated in the park, many representing the original plantings.

In particular the park has many varieties of indigenous and exotic trees, including many Asian species, notably several cedars of Lebanon planted in 1880, Himalayan cedars, Ginkgo Biloba, Byzantine hazelnuts, Siberian elms, European hollies, bamboo-leafed prickly ashesers, and Giant Sequoia.

== Métro stations ==
Located near the Metro stations: Buttes Chaumont, Laumière and Botzaris.

The Parc des Buttes Chaumont is served by Lines 5 and 7bis

== Culture ==
Each September, the park hosts the week-long Silhouette Short Film Festival.

In 2008, a modern version of the traditional Guinguette, Rosa Bonheur, was established inside the park. This unique restaurant and dance venue is government-sponsored by the Mairie of the 19th arrondissement.

Éric Rohmer shot parts of his film The Aviator's Wife in the park. Episode 3 of season two of the TV series The Art of Crime (L'art du crime) was also shot in the park.

Jean Grémillon filmed a scene in the park for his 1937 film Lady Killer (Gueule d'amour). The two main characters, Lucien Bourrache (Jean Gabin) and Madeleine (Mireille Balin), walk and converse in the park and, at one point, cross the suspension bridge over the lake.
