= Adolphe Alphand =

French engineer (1817–1891)

Jean-Charles Adolphe Alphand
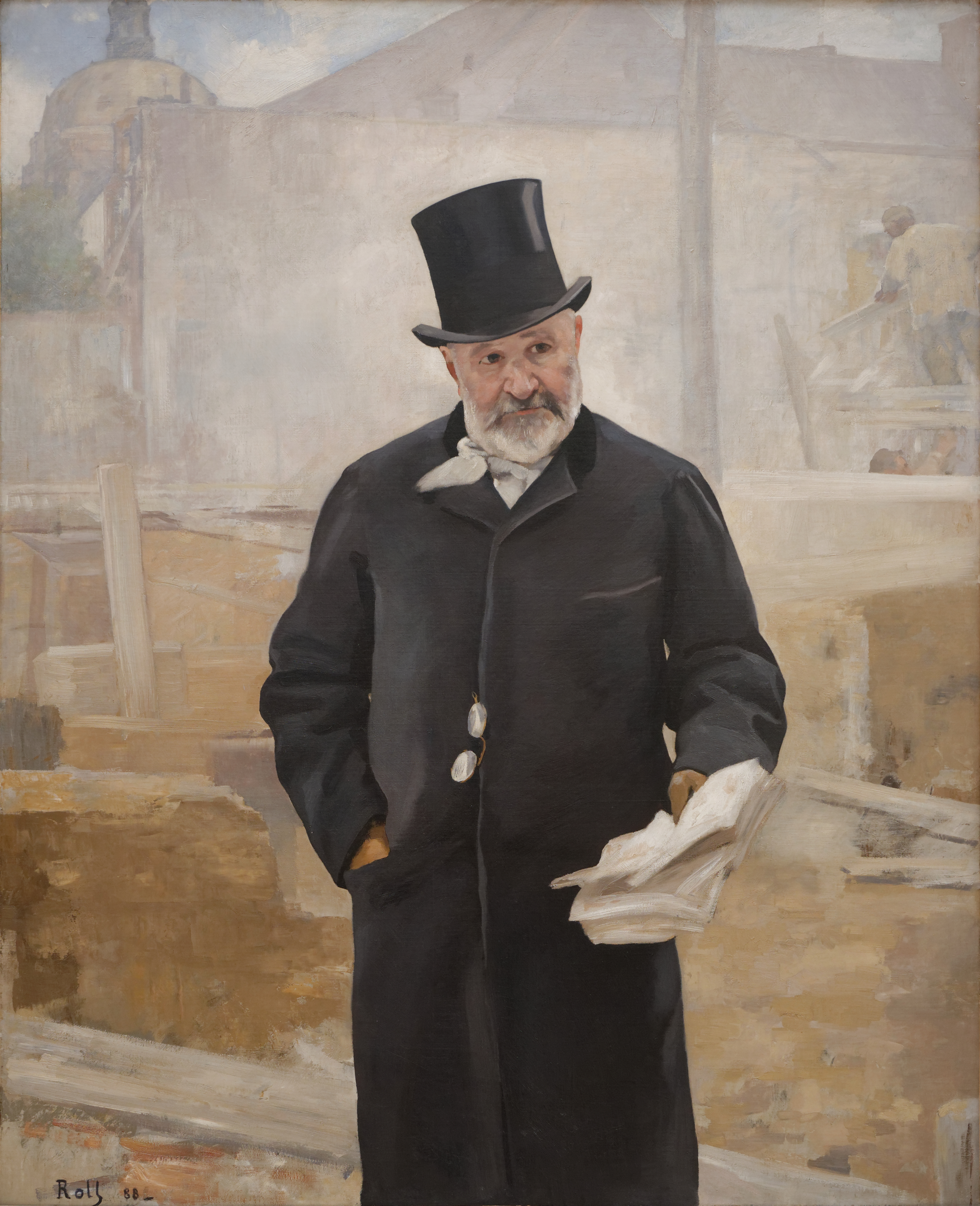
- Portrait of Jean-Charles Alphand (1888), by Alfred Philippe Roll, Petit Palais collection
- Born: 26 October 1817; Grenoble, France
- Died: 6 December 1891 (aged 74); 16th arrondissement of Paris, France
- Resting place: Père Lachaise Cemetery, Paris
- Occupation: Engineer of the Corps of Bridges and Roads

Jean-Charles Adolphe Alphand (French pronunciation: [ʒɑ̃ ʃaʁl adɔlf alfɑ̃]; 26 October 1817 – 6 December 1891) was a French engineer of the Corps of Bridges and Roads. As a close associate of Baron Haussmann and later as Director of Public Works at Paris City Hall from 1871, he was instrumental in the large-scale renovation of Paris in the second half of the 19th century. In 1889, Alphand was elevated to the rank of Grand Cross of the Legion of Honour. In 1891, shortly before his death, he succeeded Haussmann as a member of the Académie des Beaux-Arts.

== Life and career ==
Born in Grenoble, Alphand entered the École polytechnique in 1835 and continued his engineering studies at the prestigious École des ponts et chaussées in 1837. He began his career as an engineer in the coastal city of Bordeaux, working on improvements to the port, railways, as well as other infrastructure. It was in Bordeaux that Alphand met and earned the trust of Baron Haussmann, who was prefect of Gironde at the time.

In 1854, the year after Haussmann was promoted to the powerful role of prefect of Seine in Paris by Emperor Napoleon III, Haussmann hired Alphand as chief engineer of the Bois de Boulogne, a role which soon expanded into director of the newly formed parks department (Service des Promenades et Plantations) in 1855, as well as later into an all-around director of public works. Under Napoleon III, Alphand participated in the renovation of Paris directed by Baron Haussmann between 1852 and 1870, in the company of engineer Eugène Belgrand and the landscape architect Jean-Pierre Barillet-Deschamps among others. As head of the parks department, Alphand worked closely with his chief architect Gabriel Davioud.

Alphand created walks, parks and gardens designed to embellish and sanitise Paris. He also heavily remodeled the Bois de Vincennes and Bois de Boulogne in Paris's 12th and 16th arrondissements, respectively. Among the most dramatic transformations was the Parc des Buttes-Chaumont, established on the site of a former quarry, complete with waterfalls and grotto. In total, during the French Second Empire period, Alphand oversaw the creation or renovation of two large parks outside the city walls, three mid-size parks within the city walls, approximately 20 small garden "squares," and numerous tree-lined walks along avenues and boulevards in Paris. Although public parks had previously existed, according to one scholar, "Never before, in Europe or beyond, had landscape architecture played such a prominent role in so vast an urban renewal project."

Adolphe Alphand's notable accomplishments include:

- The Square du Temple
- The Paris Observatory Avenue (Avenue de l'Observatoire)
- The gardens of Champs-Élysées
- Parc Monceau
- Boulevard Richard-Lenoir
- The Bois de Vincennes
- Parc Montsouris
- The Bois de Boulogne
- The Parc des Buttes-Chaumont
- The Square des Batignolles
- The Jardin des Plantes du Mans

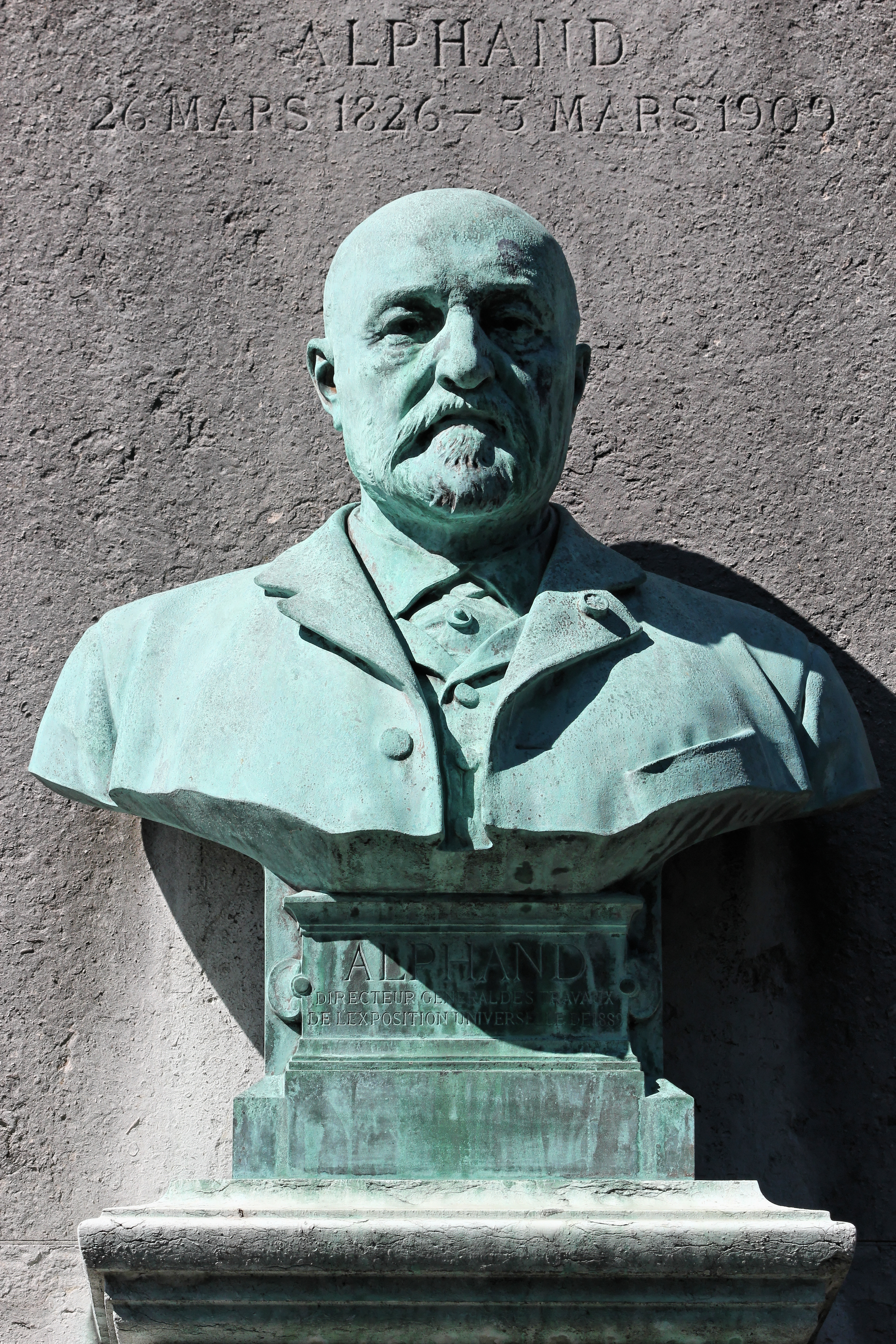
Bust of Jean-Charles Alphand over his tomb at Père Lachaise Cemetery (Jules Coutan, sculptor)

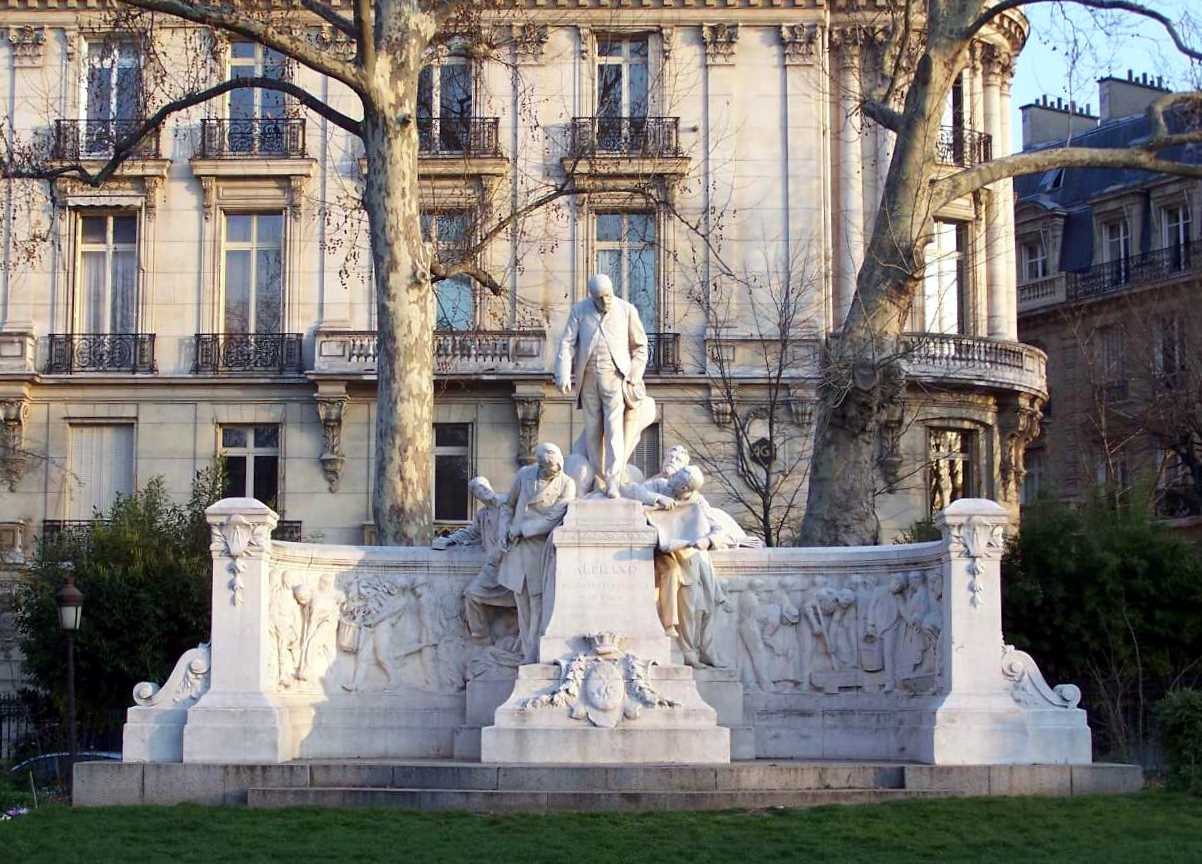
A monument to Alphand, 17–22 Avenue Foch, Paris. This monument is the work of sculptor Aimé-Jules Dalou and architect Jean-Camille Formigé.

After the retirement of Baron Haussmann, his successor, Léon Say, entrusted to Alphand the position of Director of Public Works of Paris. Under this title, Alphand continued Haussmann's works. Alphand also became the Director of Water Works after the death of Eugène Belgrand in 1878. In particular, Alphand directed the construction of:

- The fortifications of Paris
- The Trocadéro Gardens, carried out for the Paris Universal Exposition of 1878
- Preparation for the Universal Exposition of 1889
- The promenade and the gardens of Paris's Hôtel de Ville

Alphand died in 1891. He was interred at Père Lachaise Cemetery (division 67) after a grand funeral organised by the City of Paris. Avenue Alphand in Paris's 16th arrondissement was named after him in 1907.

== Bibliography ==
- Alphand, Adolphe (1867–1873). Les Promenades de Paris. Texte [Text]. Rothschild.
- Alphand, Adolphe (1867–1873). Les Promenades de Paris. Planches [Plates]. Paris: Rothschild.
- Alphand, Adolphe (1984). Les Promenades de Paris. New York, New York: Princeton Architectural Press. ISBN 0-910413-06-1. Reprint. Originally published Paris : Rothschild, 1867–1873.
