= João Carlos =

João Carlos (John Charles in Portuguese) may refer to:

- João Carlos, Prince of Beira (1821–1822), Portuguese prince
- João Carlos (football manager) (born 1956), João Carlos da Silva Costa, Brazilian football manager
- João Carlos (footballer, born 1972), João Carlos dos Santos, Brazilian football defender
- João Carlos (footballer, born 1982), João Carlos Pinto Chaves, Brazilian football centre-back
- João Carlos (footballer, born 1992), João Carlos dos Santos Torres, Brazilian football right-back
- João Carlos (footballer, born 1987), João Carlos de Castro Ferreira, Brazilian football forward
- João Carlos (footballer, born 1988), João Carlos Heidemann, Brazilian football goalkeeper
- João Carlos (footballer, born 1989), João Miguel Martins Pais De Carlos, Portuguese football winger
- João Carlos (footballer, born 1995), João Carlos Cardoso Santo, Brazilian football forward
- João Carlos (footballer, born 2001), João Carlos Barros Lopes, Brazilian football forward
- João Carlos Cavalo (born 1967), João Carlos da Silva Bento, Brazilian football manager
