= Jean-Charles Moreux =

French architect

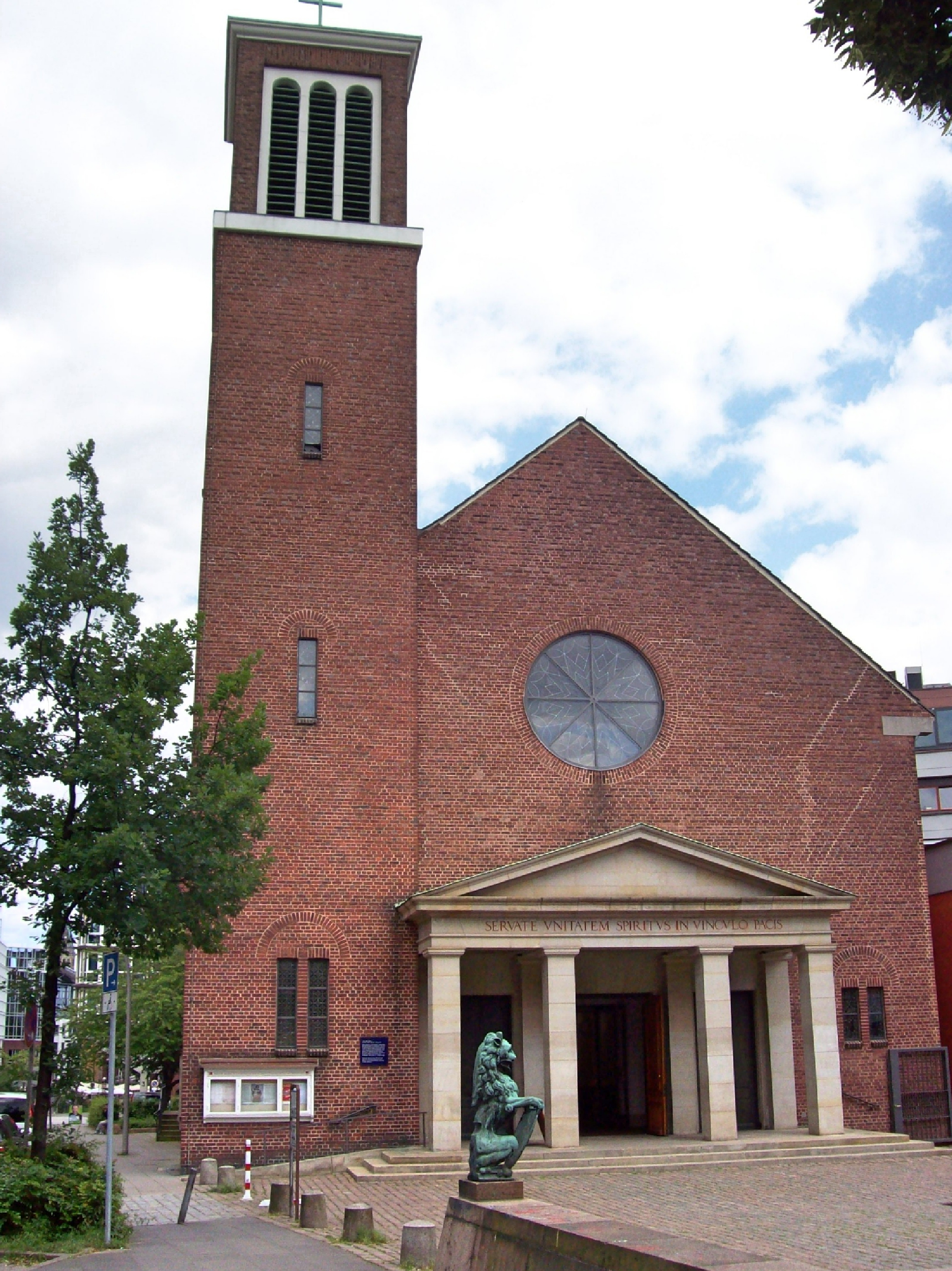
The Catholic Little Michel with church forecourt in Hamburg's Neustadt.

Jean-Charles Moreux (1889– 7 July 1956) was a French architect, and a representative of a rigorous and poetic classicism.

== Life ==
Gaining a diploma at the École des Beaux-arts de Paris in 1922, he was a friend of Jean Lurçat and worked for Jacques Doucet, baron Robert Rothschild and vicomte Charles de Noailles.

In 1926, he met Bolette Natanson (daughter of Alexandre Natanson); together they designed decorative objects and refined interiors. In 1930, he opened a gallery in Paris, christened "Les Cadres" (the Frames). Bolette passed away in 1936.

In the years that followed, he continued to exhibit his work in select Parisian salons, attracting a discreet but devoted clientele that included Jean Patou.

== Works ==
- Saint-Cloud, maison Brugier, 1926-1927.
- Saint-Leu-la-Fôret, auditorium for Wanda Landowska, 1926-1927 (private property).
- Paris, avenue Marigny, hôtel particulier for baron Robert Rothschild, 1927-1928.
- Château de Maulny at Montbizot, (Sarthe), 1929-1930.
- Paris, villa Seurat, studio-house for the sculptor Robert Couturier, 1937-1938.
- Saint-Germain-en-Laye La Thébaïde, hôtel particulier for the Véra brothers, (André and Paul), 1924.
- Paris, Hôtel particulier for Bernard Reichenbach, rue Alfred-Dehodencq, 1930-1932.
- Paris, 6, rue de Miromesnil, shop-front of Colette's shop, 1936
- Paris, jardins des Gobelins (square René-Le Gall), 1936-1938.
- Paris, pavillon de la Martinique, île des Cygnes, for the "exposition internationnale des arts et des techniques dans la vie moderne", 1937.
- Cairo, open-air restaurant for the hôtel Sheperd, 1947-1948.
- London, library of the Institut de France, Queensberry place, 1949-1950.
- Paris, musée du Louvre, rearrangement of the salle Rubens, 1952–1953, (destroyed).
- Paris, musée du Louvre, rotonde des Petits cabinets, 14 paintings from the studiolo of duke Federico da Montefeltro (1422–1482), 9 by Joos van Wassenhove and 5 attributed to Pedro Berruguete, 1953 (arrangement destroyed).
- Hamburg, St. Ansgar's and St. Bernard's Church, compleded 1955.

== Bibliography ==
- Susan Day, Jean-Charles Moreux architecte-décorateur-paysagiste, Ed. Norma, 1999.
- Histoire de l'architecture (PUF, 1968, 10 édition)
