= Alexandre Natanson =

Alexandre Natanson (27 September 1866 in Warsaw - 12 March 1938 in Paris) was a lawyer, art collector and publisher of La Revue blanche et Le Cri de Paris.

== Biography ==
Son of the banker Adam Natanson and Anne Reich, Alexandre had two brothers, Thadée et Louis-Alfred.

He attended high school at lycée Condorcet in Paris, where he met Édouard Vuillard, Maurice Denis, Marcel Proust and Daniel Halévy before studying law and becoming a lawyer.

He and his brothers Thadée et Louis-Alfred created the artistic literary review La Revue blanche.

He also founded Cri de Paris.

Natanson collected art, and on 16 May 1929 he sold off part of his collection at l'Hôtel Drouot.

He married Sara Olga Cahn, and the couple had four children, Evelyn[e] Nattier-Natanson (1891-1962), ; Bolette Natanson (1892-1936), Georgette (1894-1969) and Marcelle.<

Alexandre Natanson was buried at Montmartre cemetery on 15 March 1936.
