= Jean-Charles Bédard =

Canadian priest and Sulpician

Jean-Charles Bédard (November 4, 1766 - July 2, 1825) was a Quebec born priest and Sulpician.
