= List of parks in Amsterdam =

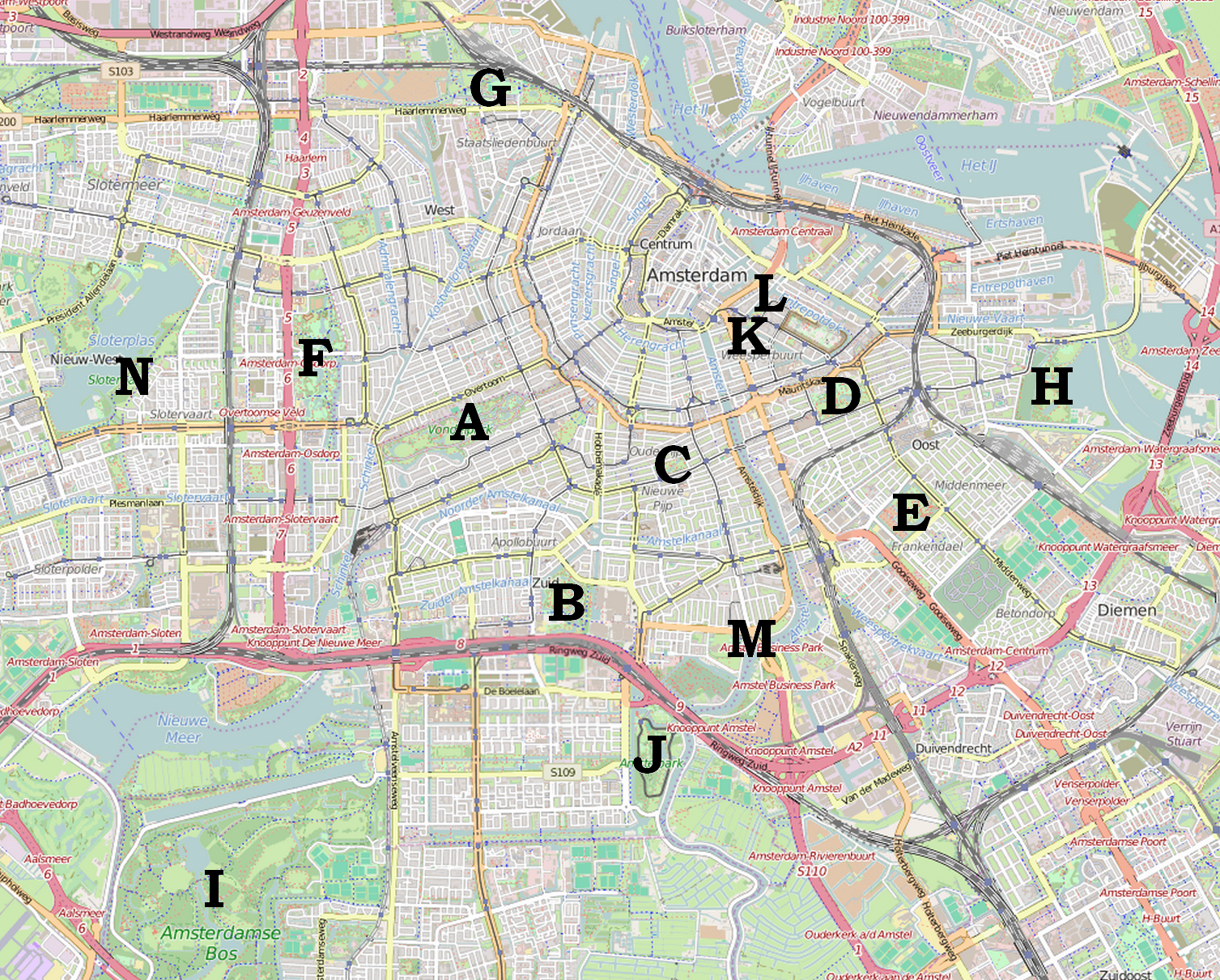
A: Vondelpark; B: Beatrixpark; C: Sarphatipark; D: Oosterpark; E: Park Frankendael; F: Rembrandtpark; G: Westerpark; H: Flevopark; I: Amsterdamse Bos; J: Amstelpark; K: Hortus Botanicus; L: Wertheimerpark; M: Martin Luther Kingpark; N: Sloterpark

There are numerous parks throughout the city of Amsterdam, Netherlands. This is a fairly complete list of the most notable ones.

== Major parks ==
=== Amstelpark ===
Amstelpark is located in the borough of Amsterdam-Zuid and is home to the Rieker windmill built in 1636.

=== Amsterdamse Bos ===
The Amsterdamse Bos is located between Amsterdam and Amstelveen. This park is around three times larger than New York City's Central Park.

=== Beatrixpark ===
Beatrixpark is named after Queen Beatrix.

=== Diemerpark ===
Diemerpark is the largest city park in Amsterdam, around twice the size of Vondelpark. It is situated south of IJburg.

=== Flevopark ===
Flevopark is located east of Central in the Indische Buurt. It contains large lawn areas, running paths, a playground, a youth centre called Jeugdland, swimming pool, and other features.

=== Frankendael ===
Frankendael is located on the east side of Middenweg south of Oosterpark.

=== Frederik Hendrikplantsoen ===
Frederik Hendrikplantsoen is located between the neighborhoods of the Jordaan and Frederik Hendrikbuurt and is named after Frederik Hendrik, son of Prince William of Orange. In 2015 the park underwent an extensive redesign and redevelopment, including the installation of an expansive children's play area and statues by artist Joep van Lieshout, which tells the story of the history of the neighbourhood, which in the 18th and 19th centuries was the heart of Amsterdam's timber and sawmill industry.

=== Hortus Botanicus ===
Established in 1638, Hortus Botanicus is one of the oldest botanical gardens in the world. It is located in the Plantage and is a major tourist attraction.

It was originally established as a herb garden for doctors and apothecaries. It now contains more than six thousand tropical and indigenous trees and plants. The monumental Palm House dates from 1912 and is renowned for its collection of cycads.

The hexagonal pavilion dates from the late 1600s. The entrance gate was built in the early 1700s. The Orangery dates from 1875, and the Palm House and Hugo de Vries Laboratory - both created in Amsterdam School expressionist architecture - date from 1912 and 1915.

=== Martin Luther Kingpark ===
Martin Luther Kingpark is located on the north bank of the Amstel River.

=== Oosterpark ===
Oosterpark is located in the Oost borough. It is the first large park laid out by the municipality of Amsterdam. It is an English garden, and was designed by Dutch landscape architect Leonard Anthony Springer and was laid out in 1891.

=== Rembrandtpark ===
Rembrandtpark park is located northwest of Vondelpark.

=== Sarphatipark ===
Sarphatipark is located in the stadsdeel Amsterdam Oud-Zuid. It is named after Samuel Sarphati. Because Sarphati was Jewish, between 1942 and 1945, the park was called "Bollandpark" after G.J.P.J. Bolland.

=== Sloterpark ===
Sloterpark is west of Amsterdam-Centrum and located around Sloterplas.

=== Vondelpark ===
The largest and most-visited park within the city is Vondelpark. It is located near Marnixplein. It is named after Joost van den Vondel, a 17th-century Amsterdam writer.

=== Wertheimerpark ===
Wertheimerpark is adjacent to Hortus Botanicus to the northeast.

=== Westerpark ===
Westerpark is in the neighbourhood of Westerpark. It is situated on the former Westergasfabriek gasworks along Haarlemmerweg.

== Comprehensive list ==
The following is a more comprehensive list:

Amstelpark, Amsterdamse Bos, Baanakkerspark, Beatrixpark, Bijlmerweide, Darwinplantsoen, De Noorderparkkamer, Diemerpark, Eendrachtspark, Eerste Marnixplantsoen, Erasmuspark, Flevopark, Florapark, Frederiksplein, Frederik Hendrikplantsoen, Gaasperpark, Geuzenbos, Gijsbrecht van Aemstelpark, Hederabrug, Ingang Noorderpark, Martin Luther Kingpark, Amsterdam, Nelson Mandelapark, Observatorium Noord, Oeverpark, Oosterpark, Park Schinkeleilanden, Piet Wiedijkpark, Pijporgel, Rembrandtpark, Rosarium Noorderpark, Sarphatipark, Schellingwouderpark, Siegerpark, Sloterpark, Trekpontje, Treurwilg, Vliegenbos, Volewijckspark, Vondelpark, Wandelparkje, Wertheimpark, Westerpark, and Windmolenpark.

== Gallery ==
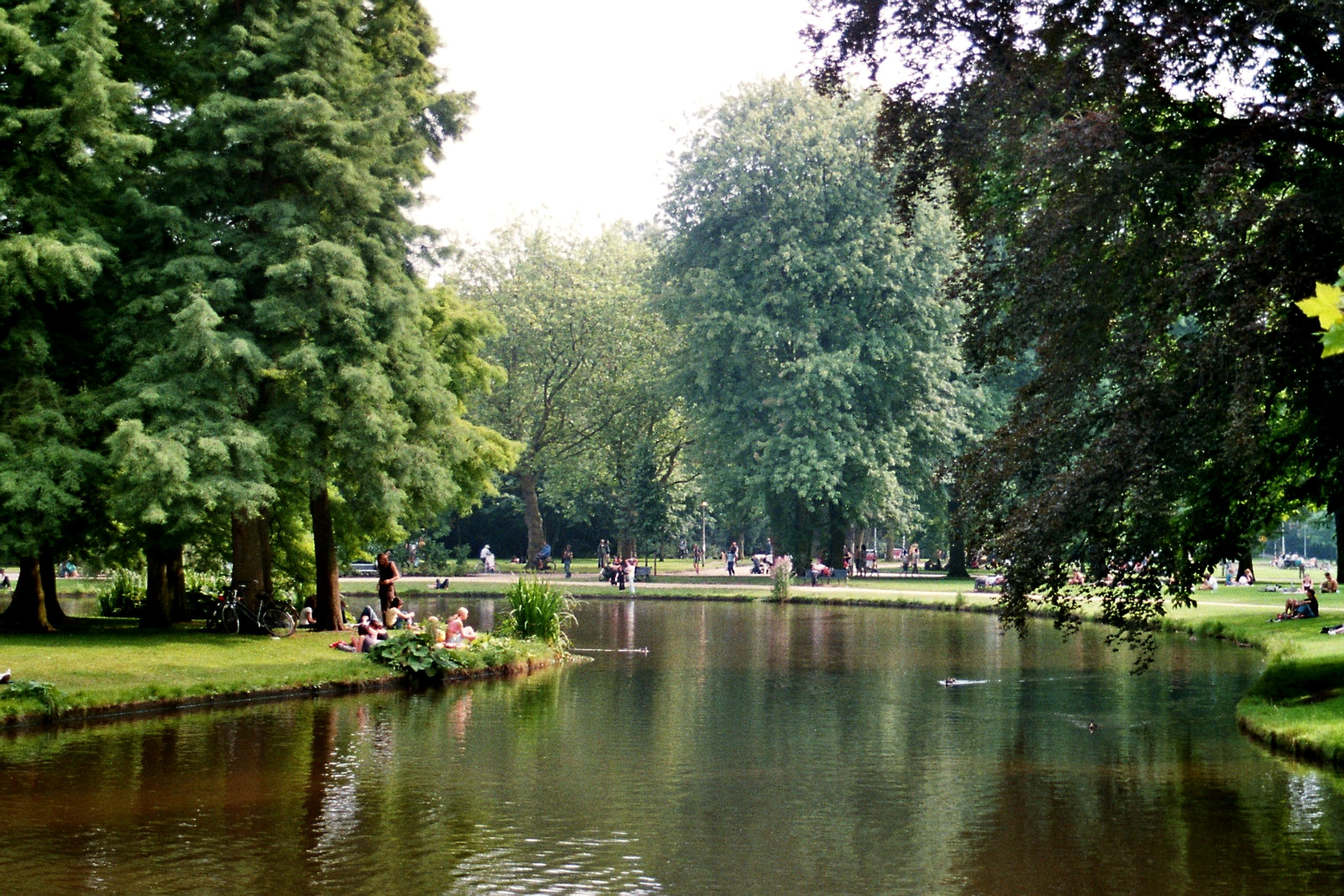
Vondelpark

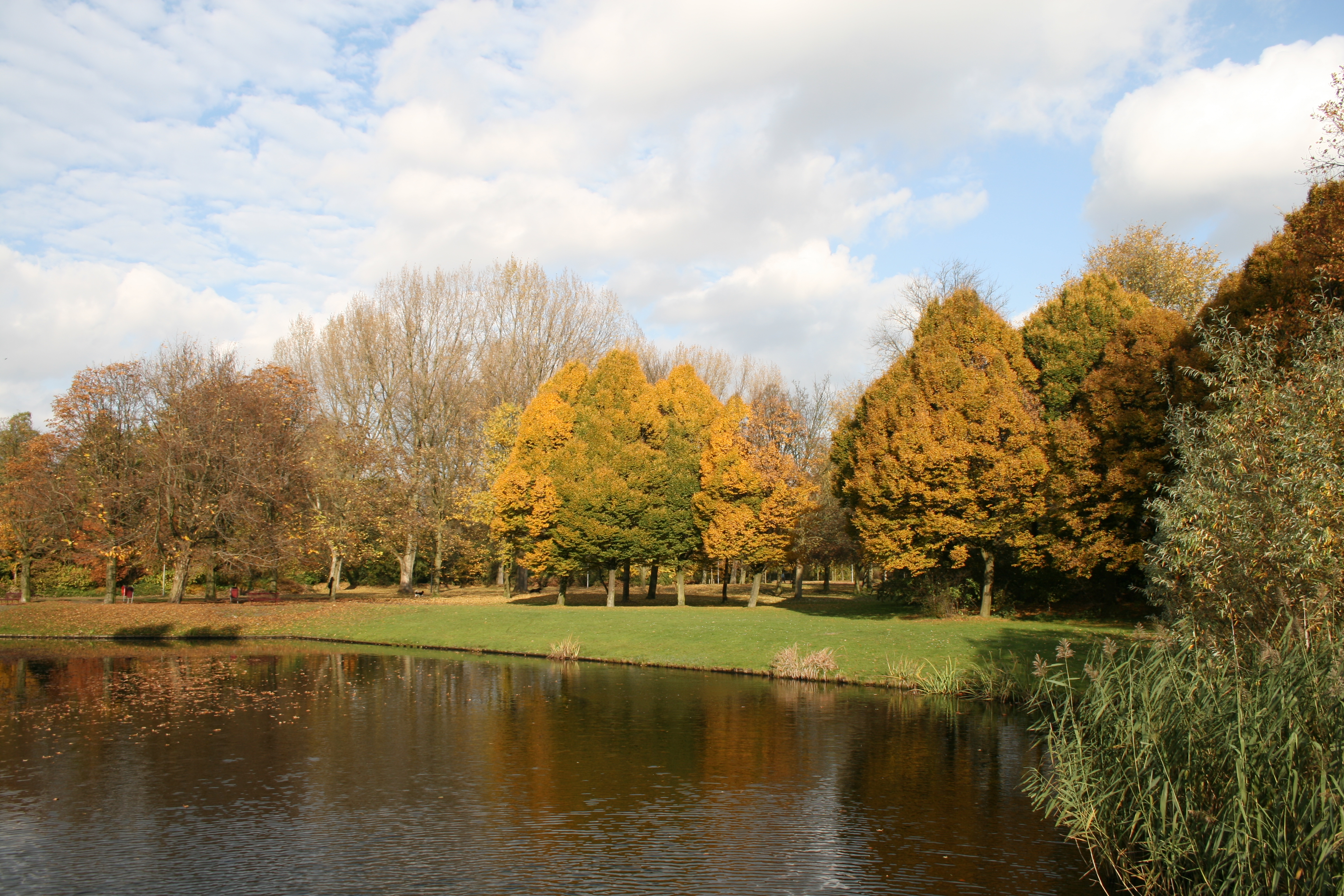
Beatrixpark

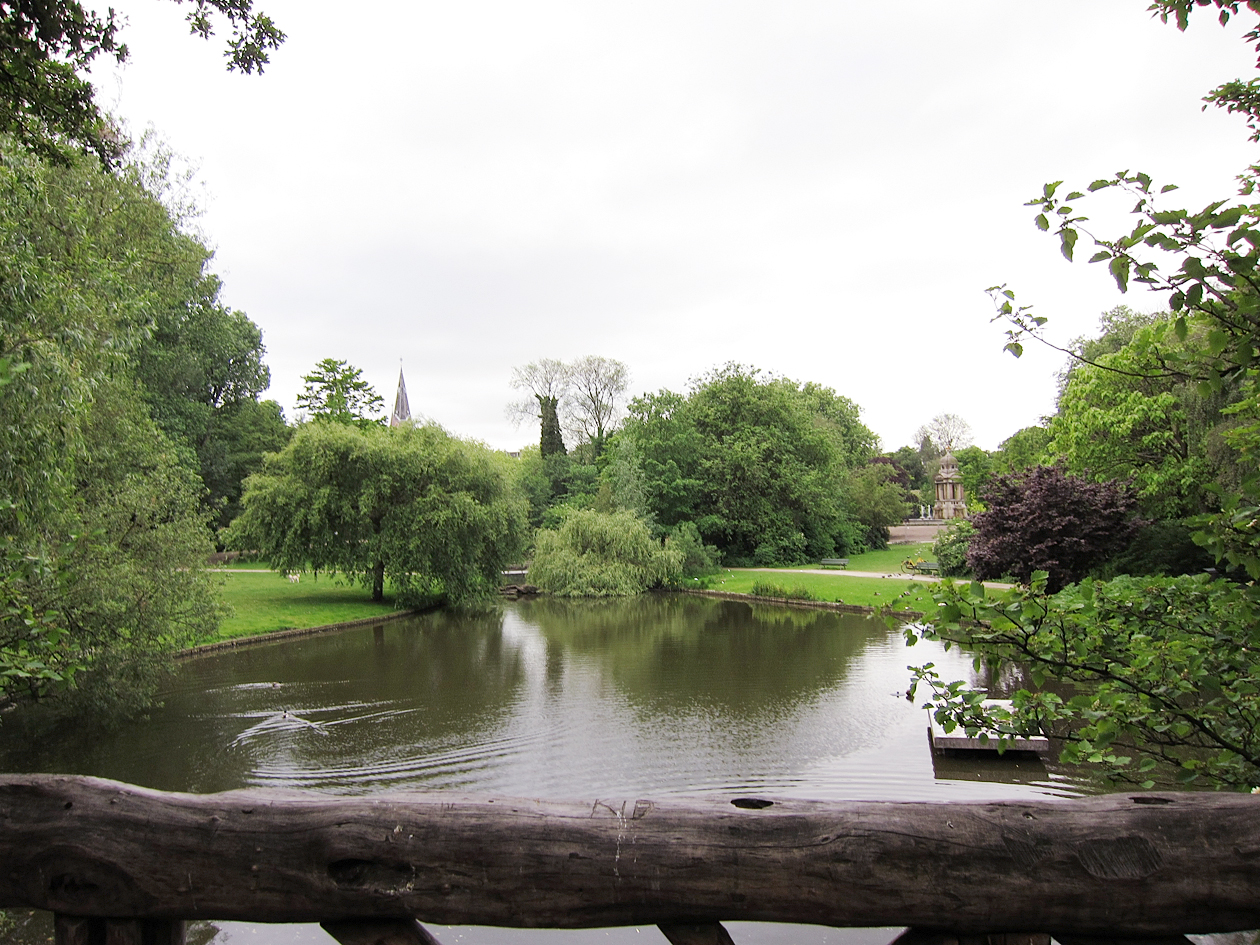
Sarphatipark

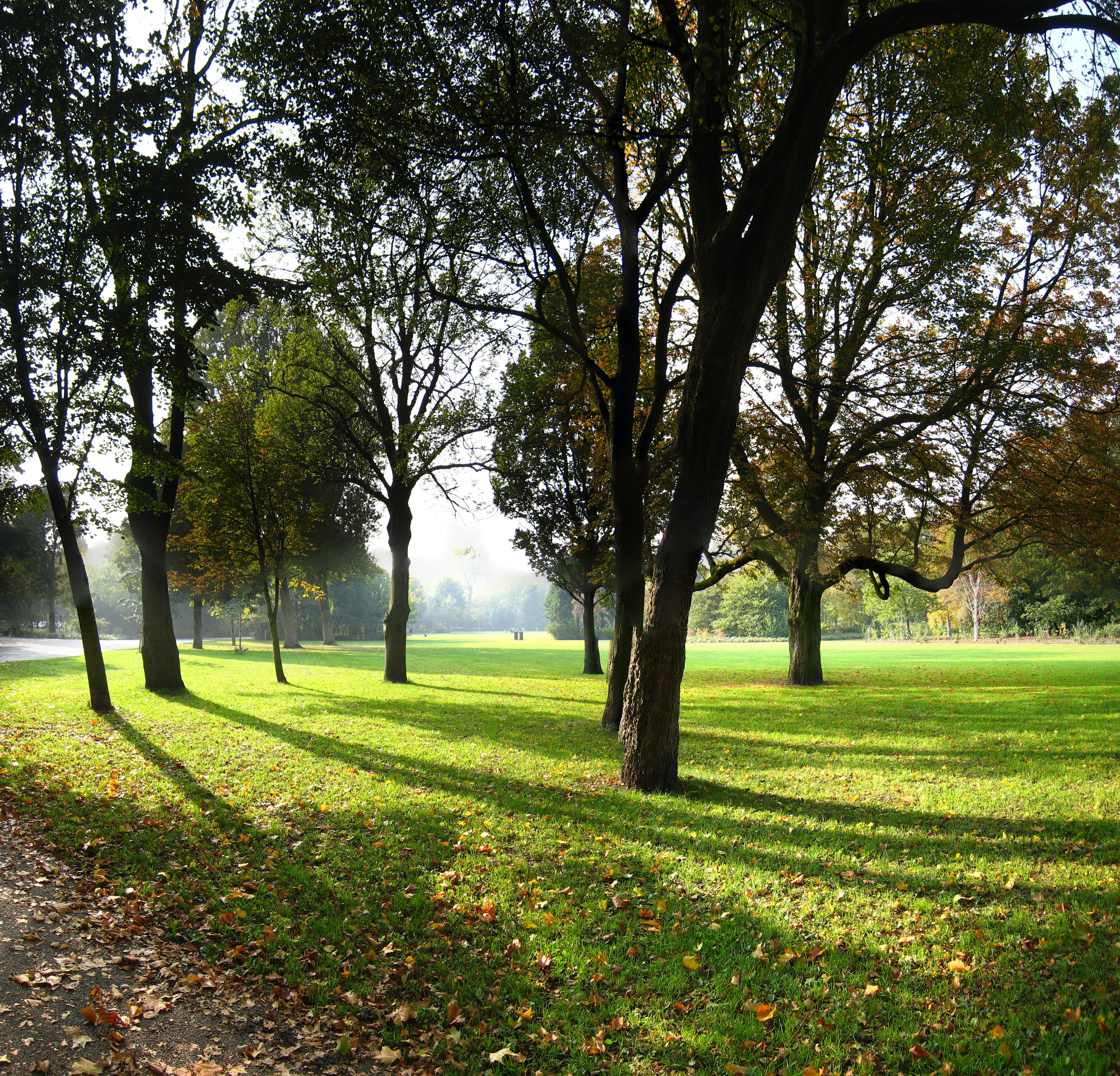
Oosterpark

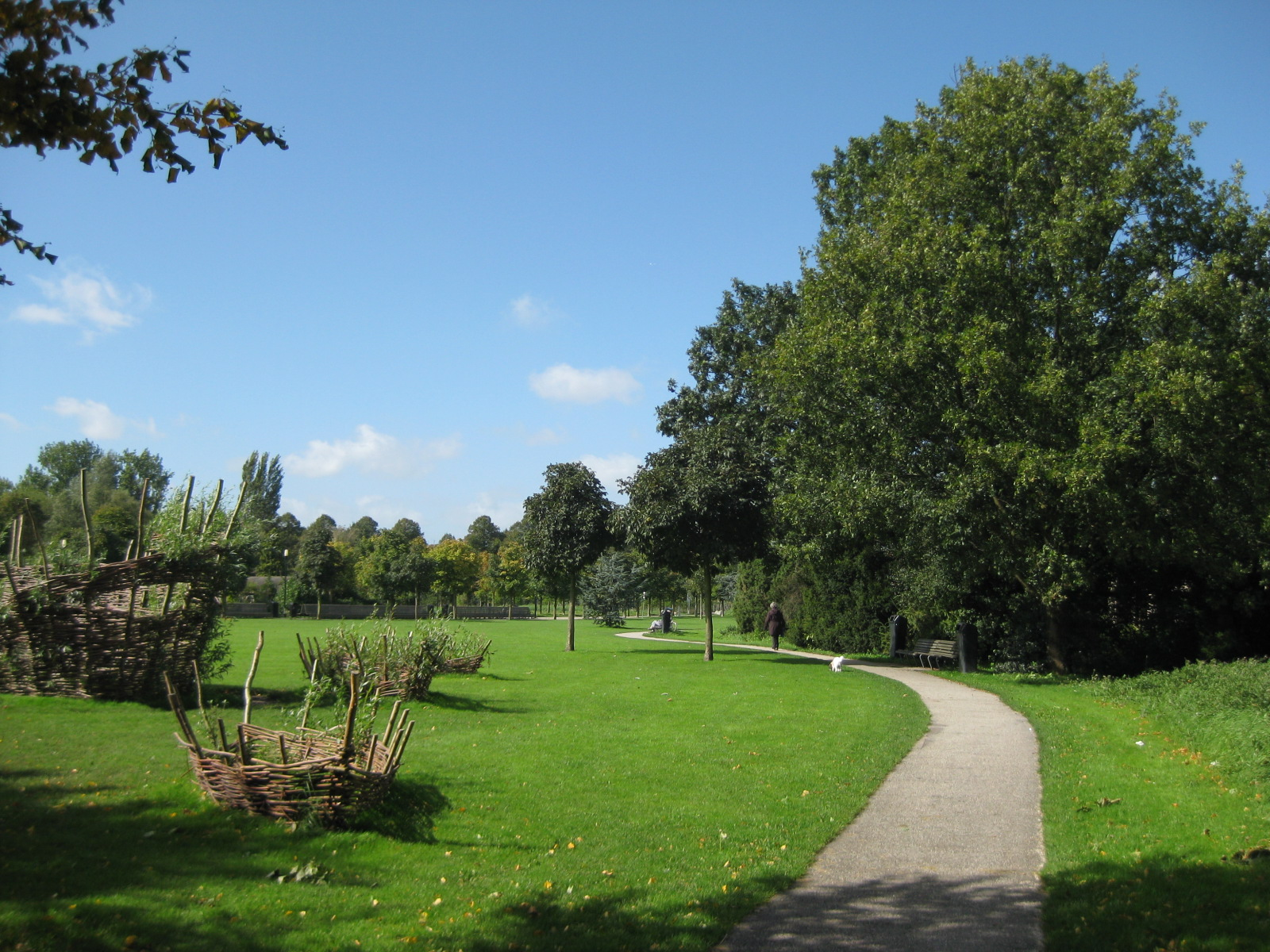
Park Frankendael

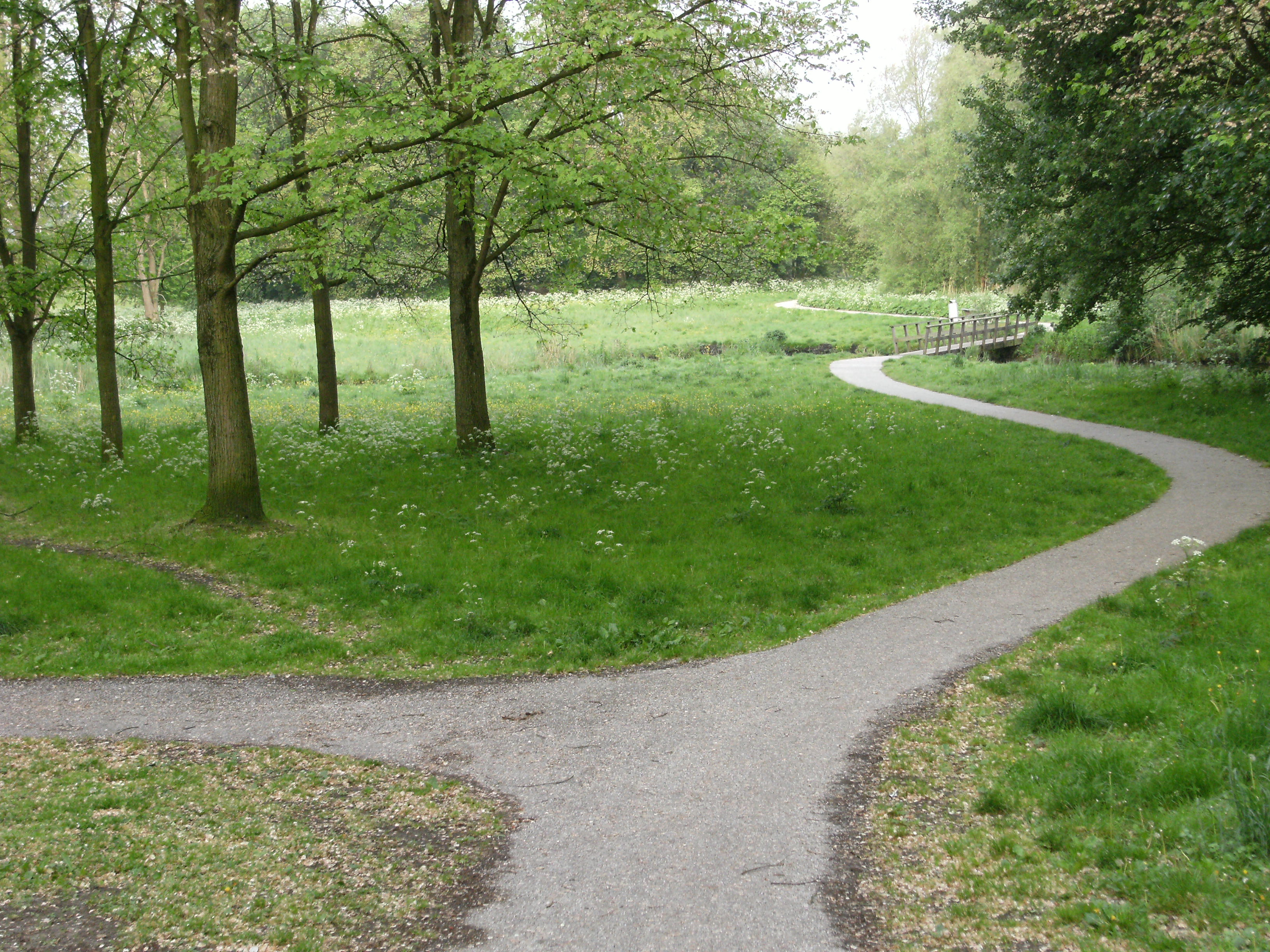
Rembrandtpark

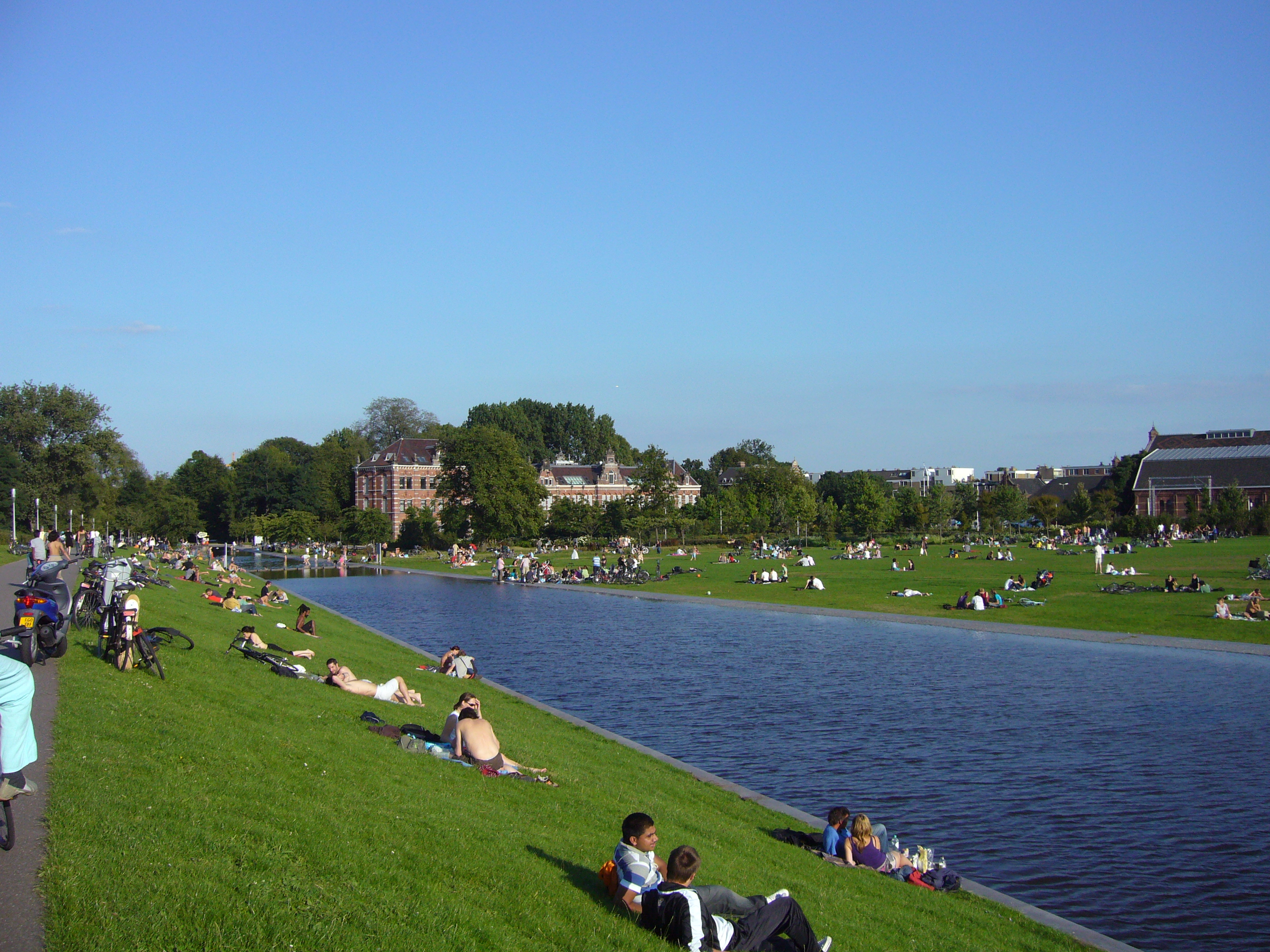
Westerpark

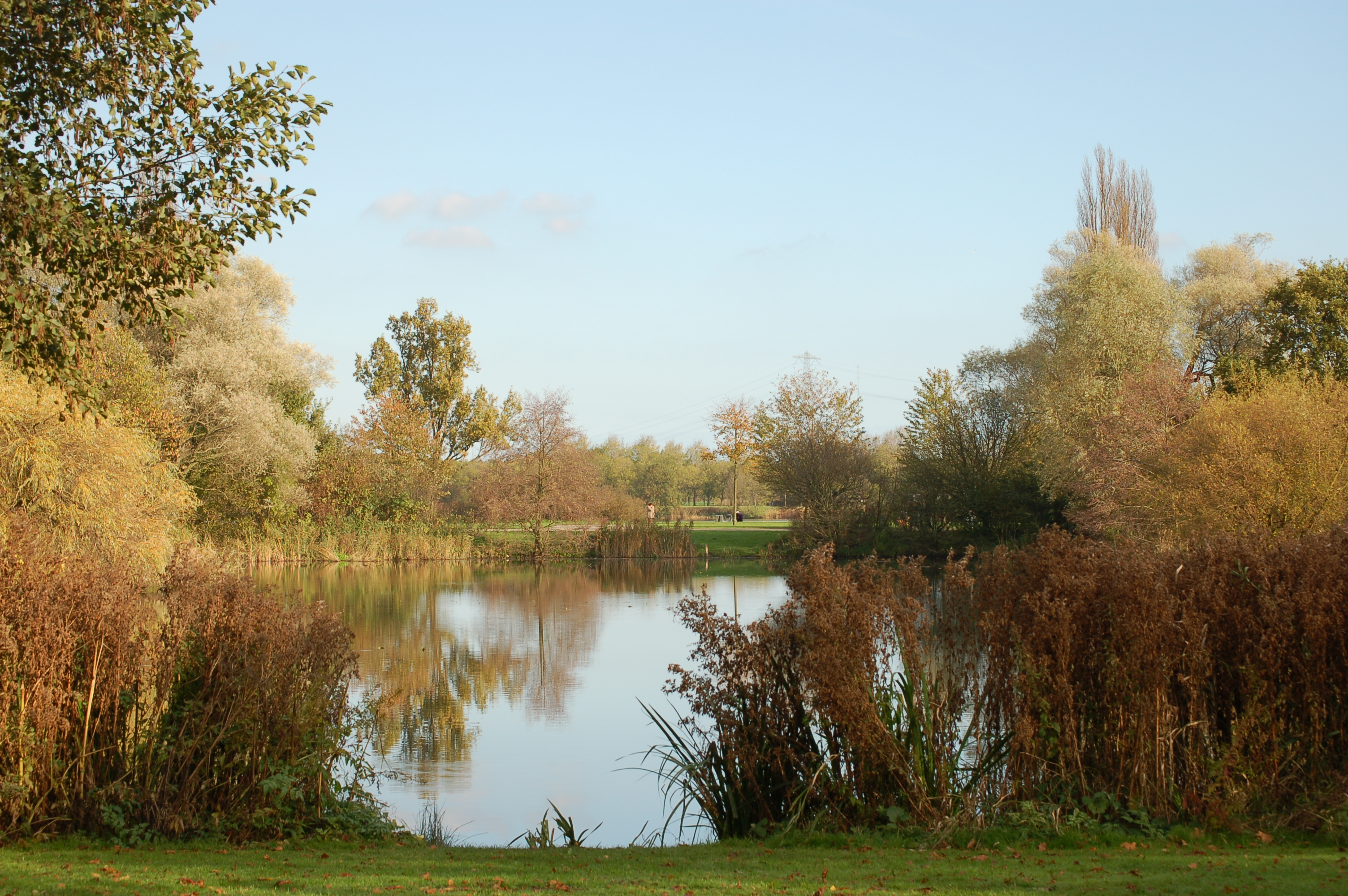
Flevopark

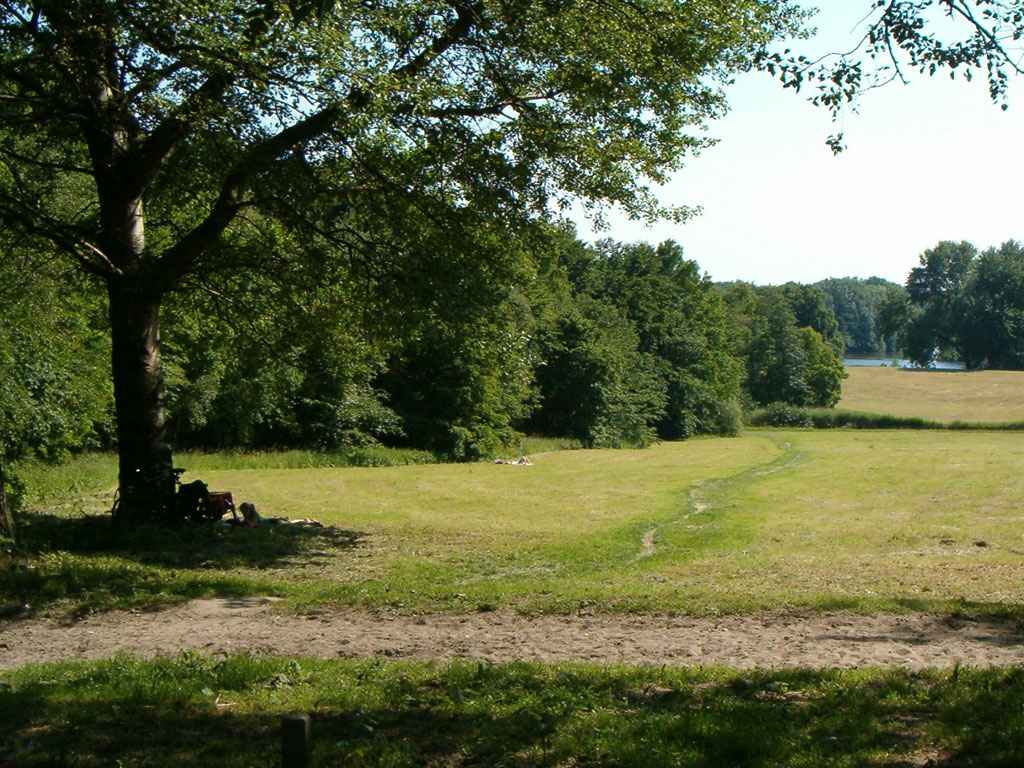
Amsterdamse Bos

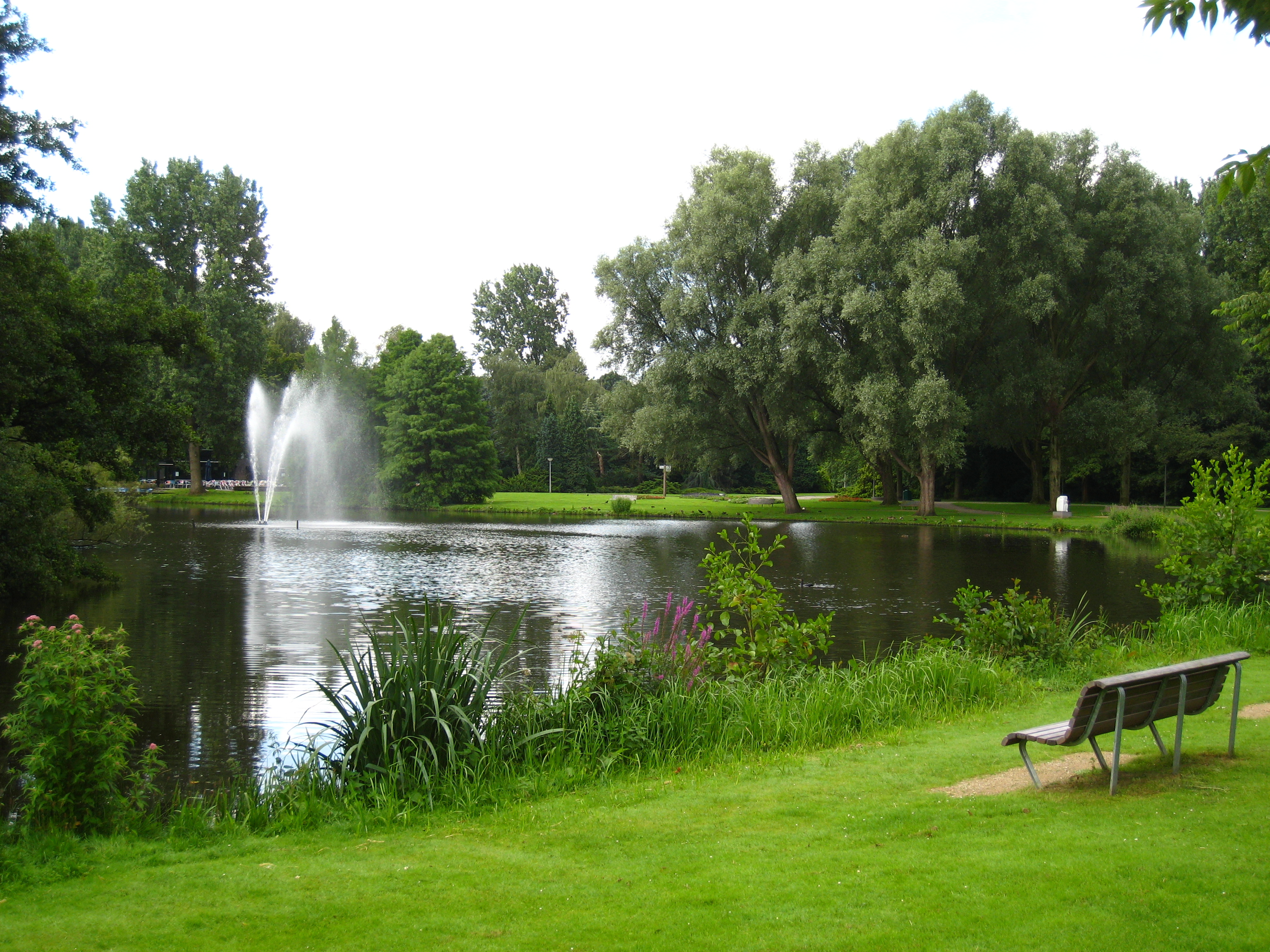
Amstelpark

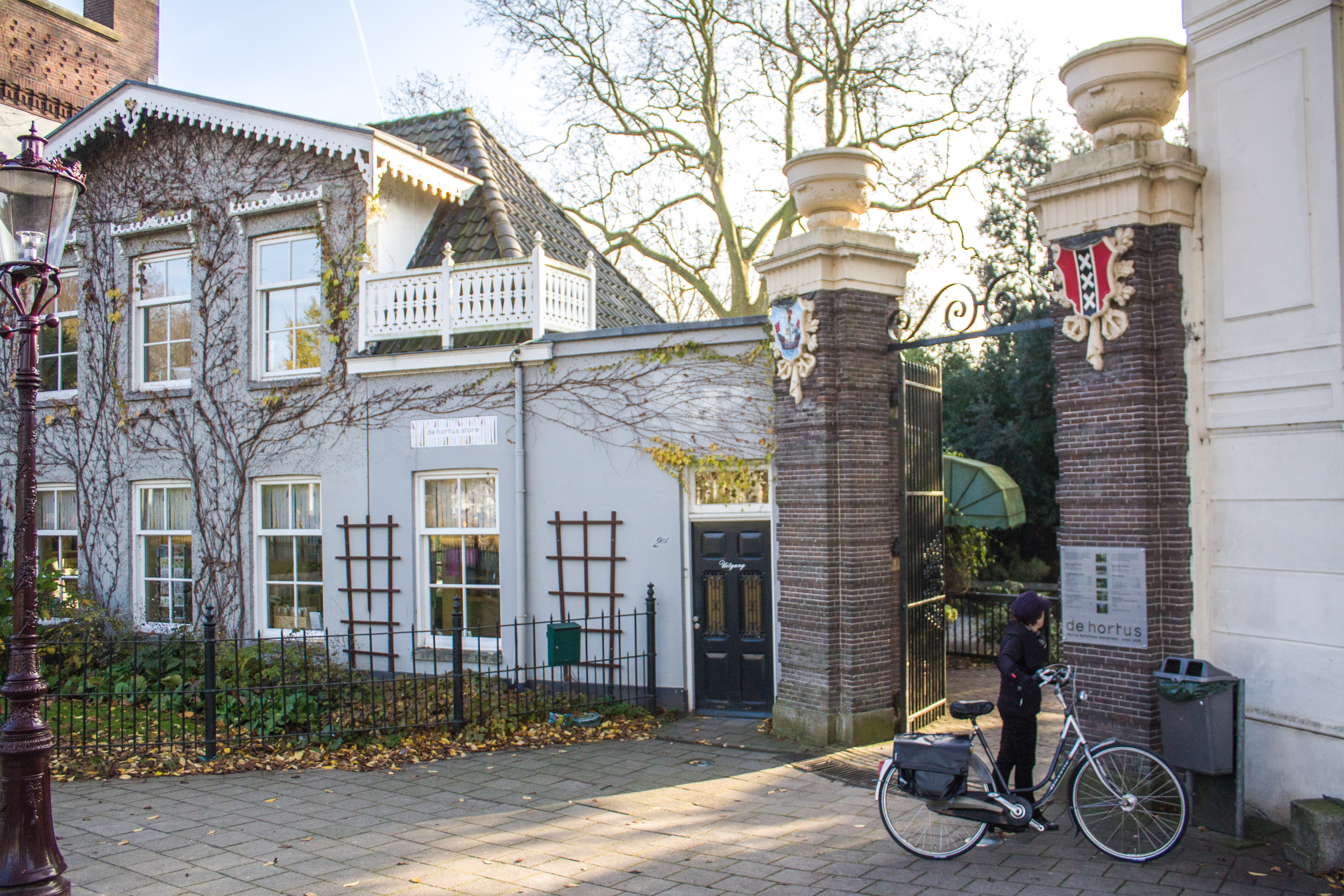
Hortus Botanicus (Amsterdam)

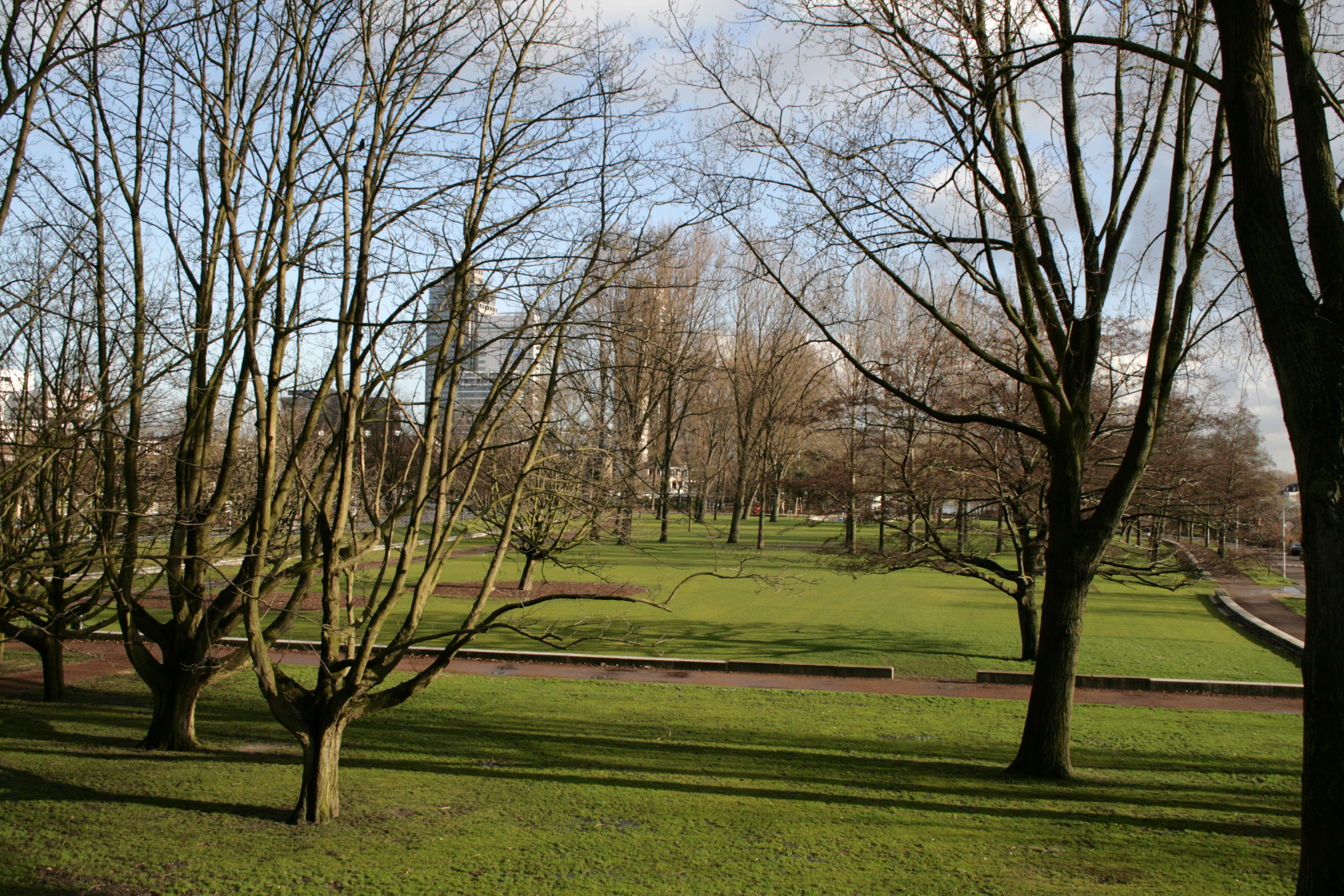
Martin Luther Kingpark

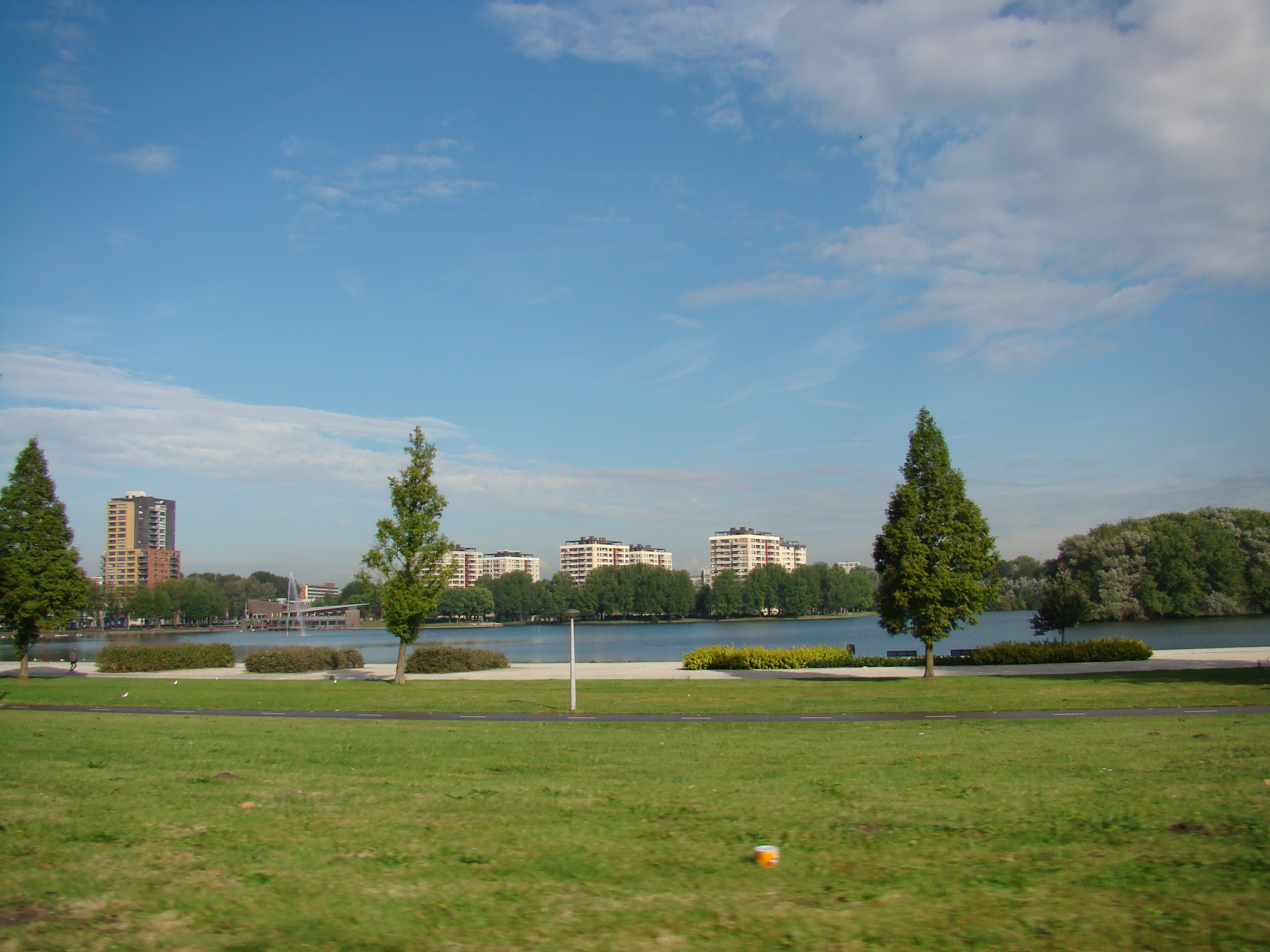
Sloterpark

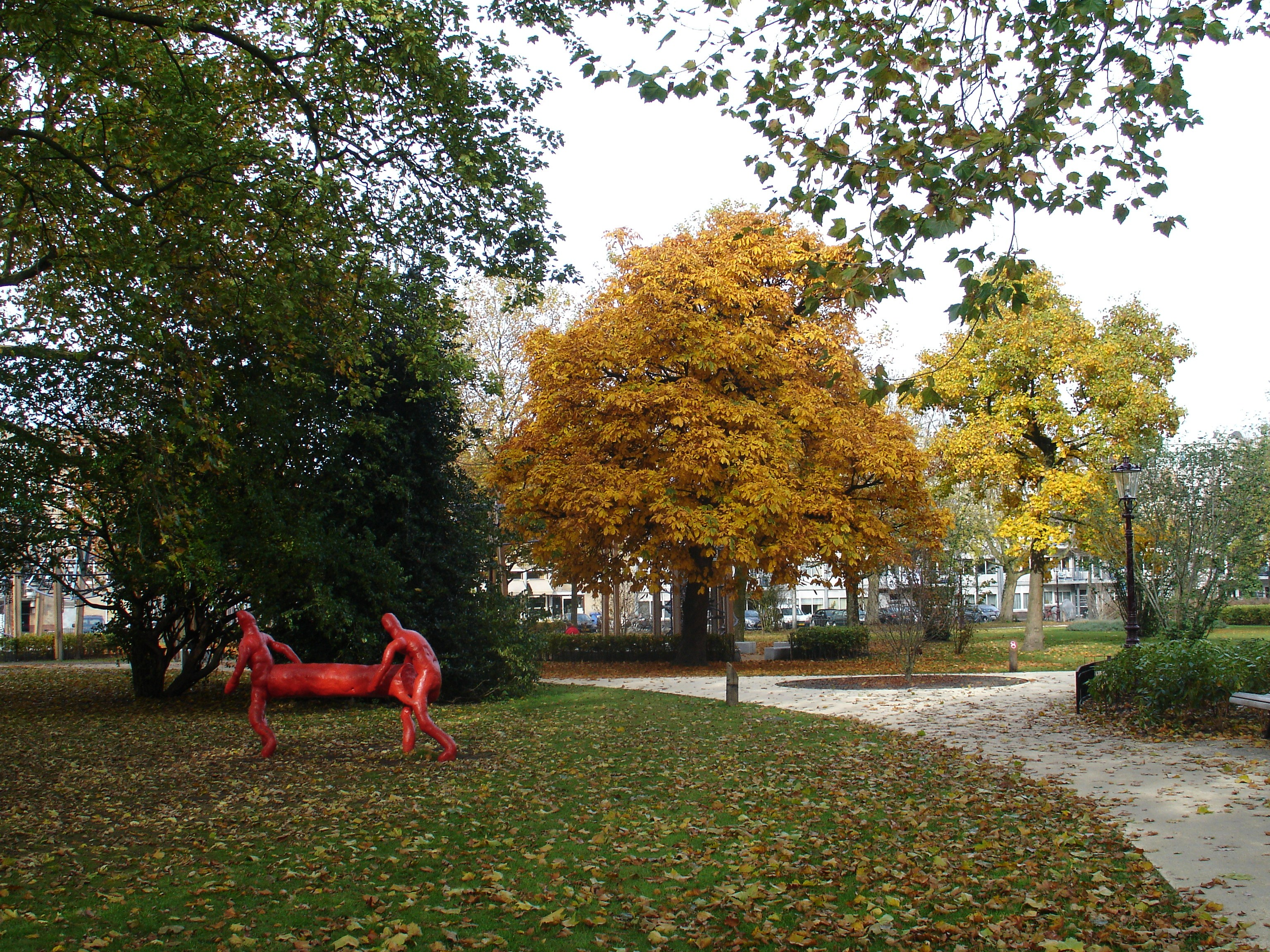
Frederik Hendrikplantsoen

== See also ==
- List of squares in Amsterdam
- List of tourist attractions in Amsterdam
