= SS J. H. Drummond =

World War II Liberty ship of the United States

History

United States
- Name: J. H. Drummond
- Namesake: James Hubert Drummond
- Owner: War Shipping Administration (WSA)
- Operator: American Export Lines, Inc.
- Ordered: as type (EC2-S-C1) hull, MC hull 2309
- Builder: J.A. Jones Construction, Panama City, Florida
- Cost: $1,017,951
- Yard number: 50
- Way number: 3
- Laid down: 19 May 1944
- Launched: 22 June 1944
- Sponsored by: Grace Edith Drummond
- Completed: 15 July 1944
- Identification: Call Signal: WRPZ
- Fate: Laid up in National Defense Reserve Fleet, Hudson River Group, 23 May 1946; Sold for commercial use, 27 November 1946

Netherlands
- Name: Hugo de Groot
- Namesake: Hugo de Groot
- Owner: Netherlands
- Operator: Nederland N.V. Stoomv. Maats, Amsterdam (1947–1950)
- Acquired: 27 November 1946
- Fate: Sold, 1950

Netherlands
- Name: Amstelpark
- Namesake: Amstelpark
- Owner: Amsterdam N.V. Reederij, Amsterdam
- Acquired: 1950
- Fate: Sold, 1960

Liberia Panama
- Name: Severn River
- Namesake: River Severn
- Owner: International Navigation Corp.
- Operator: Wm. H. Muller, London
- Acquired: 1960
- Fate: Sold, 1965
- Notes: Reflagged for Panama, 1961

Panama
- Name: Angelic
- Owner: Cia. Eleosa Nav
- Operator: Kronos Shipping Co., London
- Acquired: 1950
- Fate: Ran aground, 25 July 1966; Refloated, declared constructive total loss (CTL), scrapped

General characteristics
- Class & type: Liberty ship; type EC2-S-C1, standard
- Tonnage: 10,865 LT DWT; 7,176 GRT
- Displacement: 3,380 long tons (3,434 t) (light); 14,245 long tons (14,474 t) (max)
- Length: 441 feet 6 inches (135 m) oa; 416 feet (127 m) pp; 427 feet (130 m) lwl
- Beam: 57 feet (17 m)
- Draft: 27 ft 9.25 in (8.4646 m)
- Installed power: 2 × Oil fired 450 °F (232 °C) boilers, operating at 220 psi (1,500 kPa); 2,500 hp (1,900 kW)
- Propulsion: 1 × triple-expansion steam engine, (manufactured by Willamette Iron & Steel Corp., Portland, Oregon); 1 × screw propeller
- Speed: 11.5 knots (21.3 km/h; 13.2 mph)
- Capacity: 562,608 cubic feet (15,931 m^{3}) (grain); 499,573 cubic feet (14,146 m^{3}) (bale)
- Complement: 38–62 USMM; 21–40 USNAG
- Armament: Varied by ship; Bow-mounted 3-inch (76 mm)/50-caliber gun; Stern-mounted 4-inch (102 mm)/50-caliber gun; 2–8 × single 20-millimeter (0.79 in) Oerlikon anti-aircraft (AA) cannons and/or, 2–8 × 37-millimeter (1.46 in) M1 AA guns

SS J. H. Drummond was a Liberty ship built in the United States during World War II. She was named after James Hubert Drummond, the former mayor of St. Andrews, Florida, now part of Panama City, Florida.

== Construction ==
J. H. Drummond was laid down on 25 May 1944, under a Maritime Commission (MARCOM) contract, MC hull 2309, by J.A. Jones Construction, Panama City, Florida; she was sponsored by Grace Edith Drummond, the widow of the namesake, and launched on 30 June 1944.

== History ==
She was allocated to American Export Lines, Inc., on 20 July 1944. On 23 May 1946, she was laid up in the National Defense Reserve Fleet, in the Hudson River Group. On 25 July 1947, she was sold to the Netherlands, for commercial use. She was renamed Hugo de Groot and sailed under a Dutch flag until 1960, when she was sold to International Navigation Corp., and reflagged for Liberia, and renamed Severn River. On 25 July 1966, after having been sold to Cia Eleosa Nav., and reflagged for Panama, and renamed Angelic, she ran aground off Nojima Saki, Chiba, Japan, in fog. She was refloated but declared a constructive total loss (CTL) and later scrapped at Yokosuka, Japan.

== Bibliography ==
- "Jones Construction, Panama City FL". www.ShipbuildingHistory.com. 13 October 2010.
- "Liberty Ships – World War II".
- Maritime Administration. "J. H. Drummond". Ship History Database Vessel Status Card. U.S. Department of Transportation, Maritime Administration. Archived from the original on 12 December 2019.
- Davies, James (May 2004). "Specifications (As-Built)" (PDF). p. 23.
- "SS J. H. Drummond".
- Womack, Marlene (13 April 2013). "OUT OF THE PAST: Bay, Washington counties split". Panama City News Herald. Archived from the original on 23 December 2017.
- "He Put Panama City On the Gulf". Wainwright Liberator. Vol. 2, no. 50. 1 July 1944. Archived from the original on 23 December 2017.
