= Floriade 1972 =

Garden festival in Amsterdam, Netherlands

EXPO 1972 Amsterdam
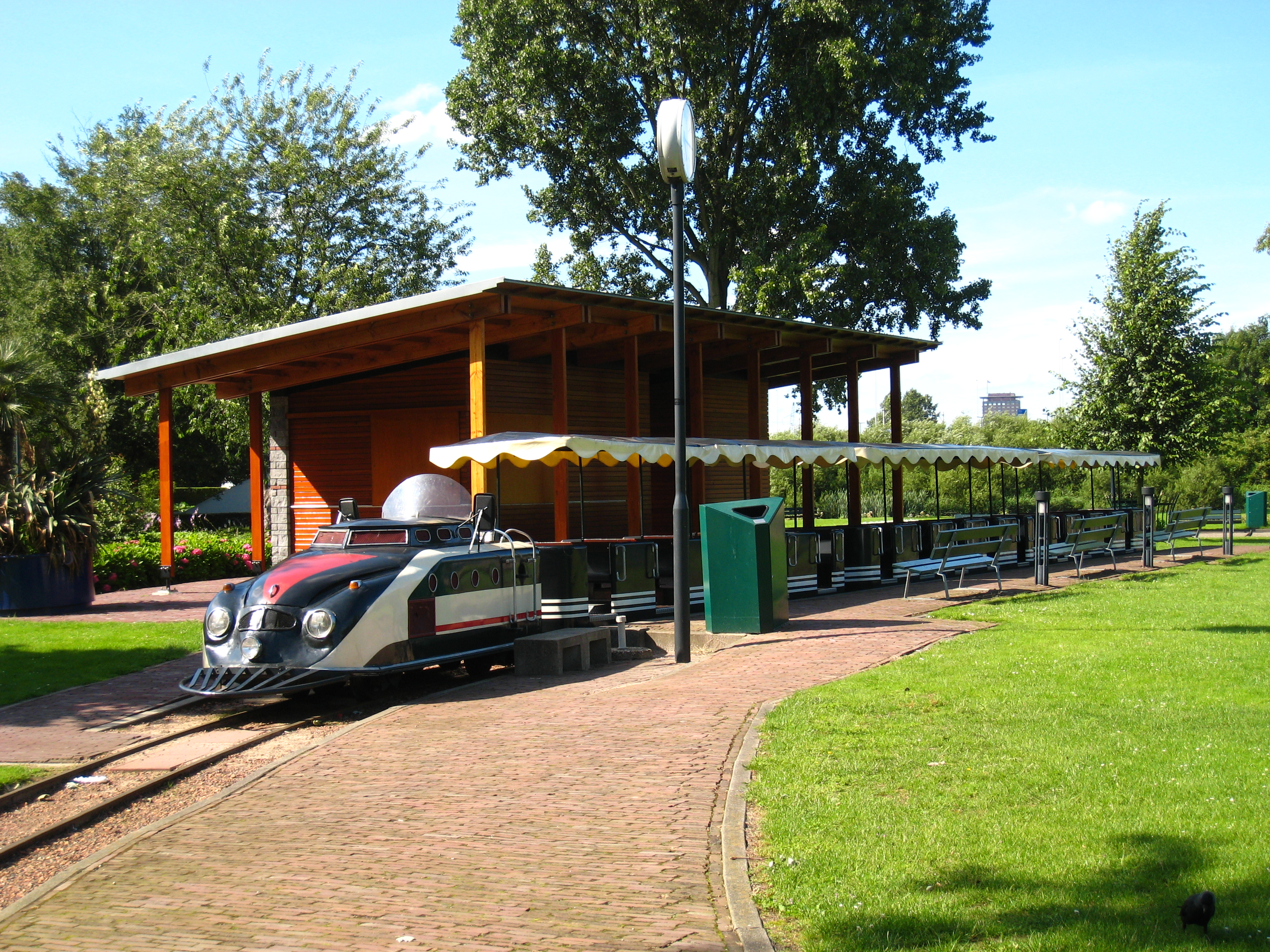
- The Amstel Train at Amstelpark

Overview
- BIE-class: Horticultural exposition
- Name: Floriade 1972
- Area: 700,000 m^{2} indoor and outdoor 11,000

Location
- Country: Netherlands
- City: Amsterdam
- Venue: Amstelpark and Beatrix Park

Timeline
- Opening: March 30, 1972
- Closure: October 1, 1972

Horticultural expositions
- Previous: Paris 1969 in Paris
- Next: Hamburg 1973 in Hamburg

Floriade 1972 was a garden festival held in Amsterdam, Netherlands following its recognition by the Bureau International des Expositions (BIE). The 1972 exposition was the fifth edition of the international horticultural exposition organised under the auspices of the Association of International Horticultural Producers (AIPH) and the second Floriade in the Netherlands. The first Amsterdam Floriade lasted from March 30 to October 1, 1972.

The exposition was held at the newly created Amstelpark and Beatrix Park. The landscaped grounds at Amstelpark covered 700.000 m^{2}. Beatrix Park, part of the Amsterdam RAI Exhibition and Convention Centre and a portion of the embankment on which later the ring road south and the Amsterdam RAI railway station were built, was part of the Floriade. The sites were connected by a cable car and carts. A narrow gauge railway and Ferris wheel were also built at Amstelpark.

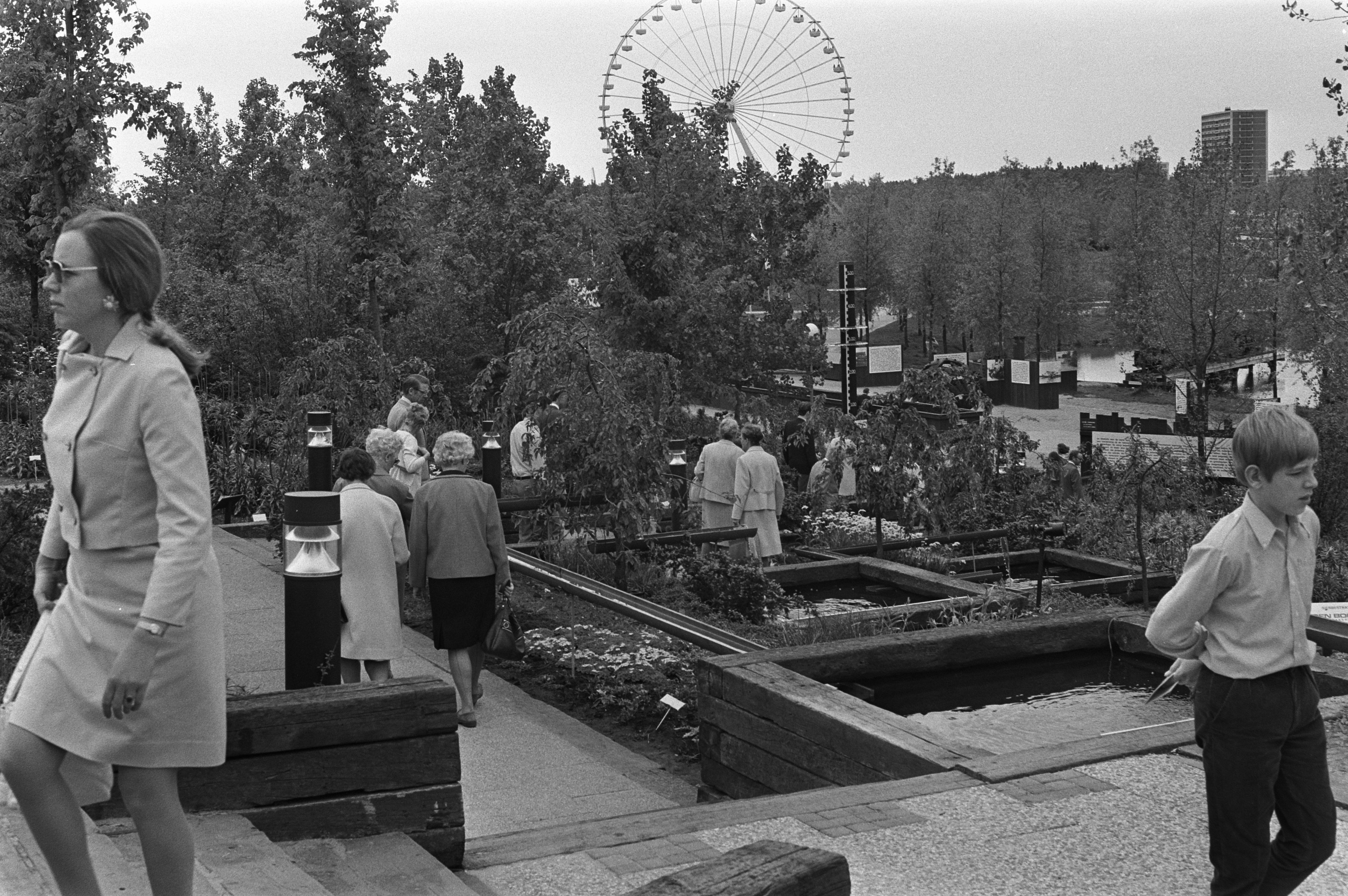
Visitors in the terraced gardens on the dike

After the closure of the Floriade, much of the amenities that were built for the event remained at Amstelpark. These included the Amstel train (a narrow-gauge railway ), a maze, a rose garden, an orangery, the Glass House, greenhouses, a miniature golf course, the Rhododendron Valley, The Abandoned land, Galerie Papillon Park and a large playground for children.
