= Parc floral de Paris =

Public garden, France

Coordinates: 48.838°N 2.444°E

EXPO 1969 Paris
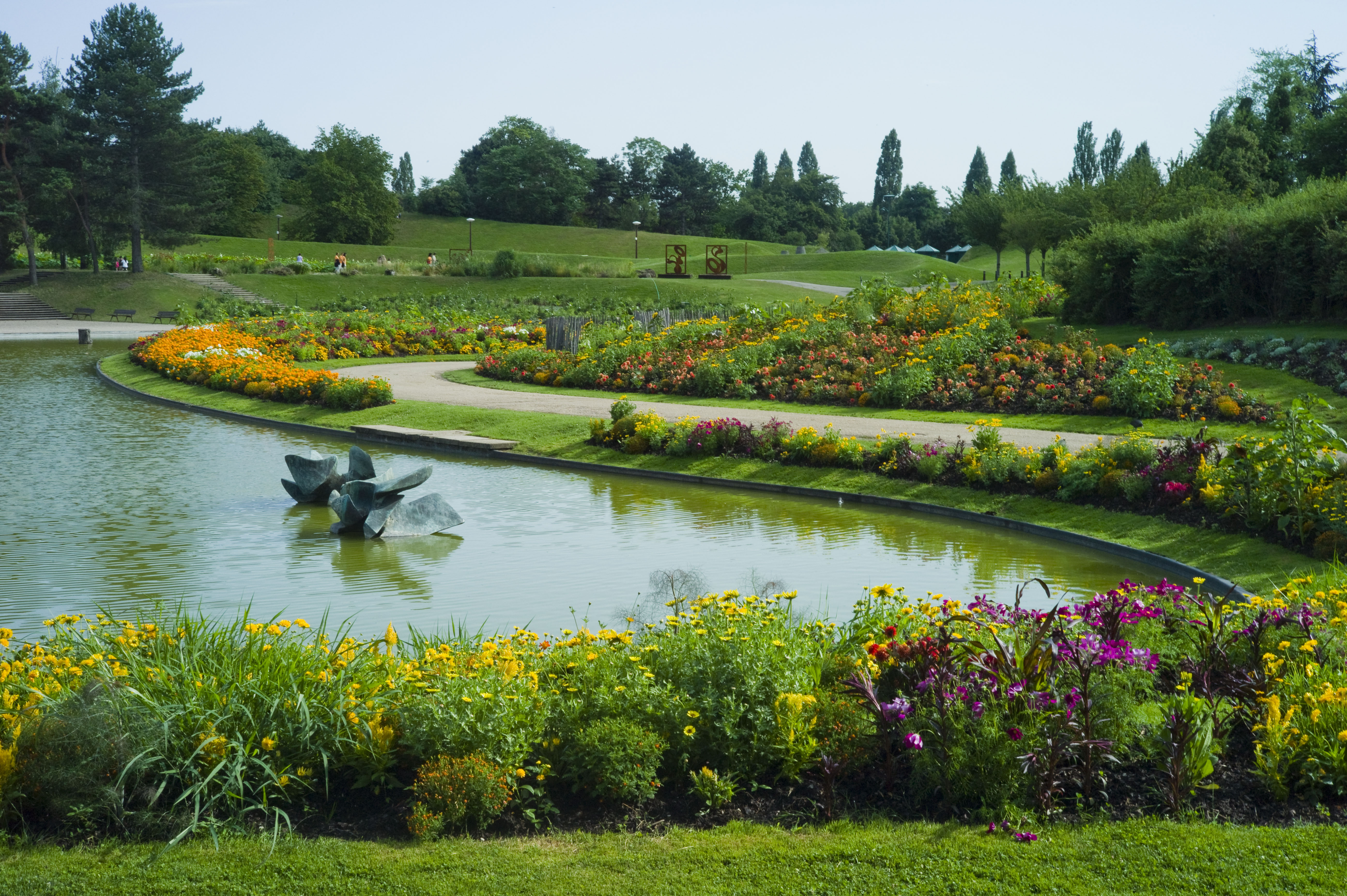

Overview
- BIE-class: Horticultural exposition

Location
- Country: France
- City: Paris

Horticultural expositions
- Previous: Vienna 1964 in Vienna
- Next: Floriade 1972 in Amsterdam

Specialized expositions
- Previous: HemisFair '68 in San Antonio
- Next: Expo 71 in Budapest

Universal expositions
- Previous: Expo 67 in Montreal
- Next: Expo '70 in Osaka

The Parc floral de Paris (French pronunciation: [paʁk flɔʁal də paʁi]) is a public park and botanical garden located within the Bois de Vincennes in the 12th arrondissement of Paris. Created in 1969, the park remains the legacy of the international horticultural exposition, which was organised under the auspices of the International Association of Horticultural Producers (AIPH) and recognised by the Bureau International des Expositions (BIE). It is one of four botanical gardens in Paris, and is the site of major annual flower shows. The nearest metro station to the park is Chateau-de-Vincennes.

== History ==
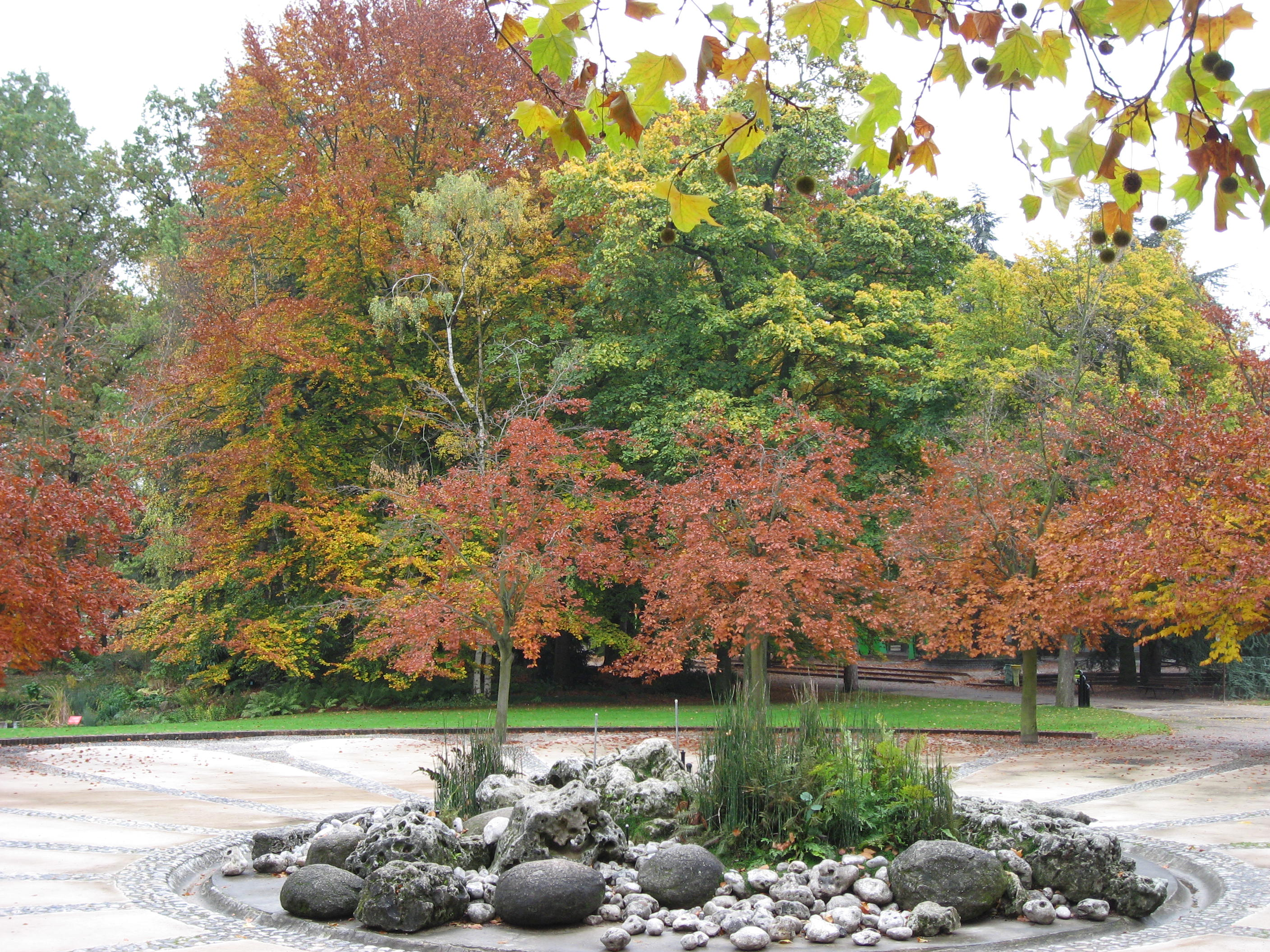
Autumn in the Parc floral

The Parc floral, as a part of the Bois de Vincennes, had originally been part of a royal park and hunting domain. The park had been enclosed with a wall by King Philippe-Auguste in the 12th century, and the neighboring chateau was built by King Charles V of France. King Louis XV had reforested the park and built paths and promenades, and a pyramid (1831), still visible, just outside the Parc Floral, at the intersection of the route de Polygone and route royale de Beauté.

After the French Revolution, Napoleon Bonaparte had turned the Bois de Vincennes into a training ground for his soldiers. Between 1840 and 1843 The land occupied by the Parc Floral was mostly deforested and turned into an immense field of 166 hectares where the infantry practiced manoeuvres. During the Second Empire of Napoleon III, a large part of the Bois de Vincennes was made into a public park, but the area of the future Parc floral remained under military control well after the Second World War. It was largely flat, had a few buildings which could be used for exhibit space. Its most promising assets were a grove of oaks and a grove of pine trees.

The Bois de Vincennes had hosted a major international flower show, called the Floralies, in 1959 and 1964. The city of Paris decided to create a permanent exhibition space for the Floralies and other botanical exhibits and shows. In 1969 the Paris city architect, Daniel Collin, was put in charge of the project, assisted by several different architects for different parts of the garden: Caroline Stefulesco-Mollie for the valley of flowers; Jacques Sgard for the sculpture garden; Alain Provost for the water garden; and Lucienne Talihade-Collin for the playground.

== Features of the park ==
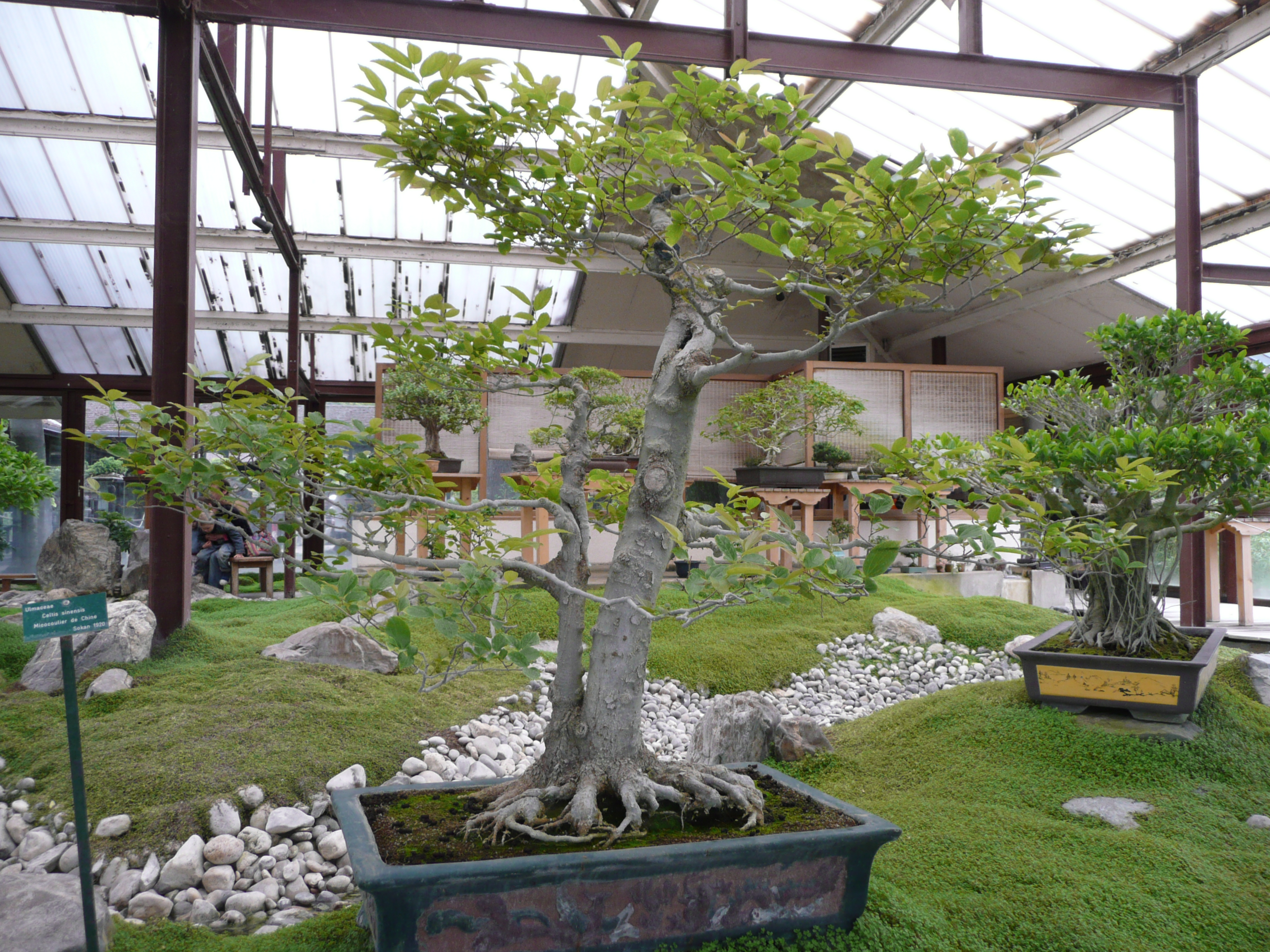
The greenhouse of bonsai in the Parc floral de Paris

The park occupies 31 hectares, making it the fourth-largest park in Paris, after the Bois de Boulogne, Bois de Vincennes (of which it forms a considerable part) and Parc de la Villette (35 hectares), but larger than the Tuileries gardens.

Like other city parks of the 1960s and 1970s, the Parc Floral was seen as a form of amusement park, as well as a botanical garden. It features the Delta, a large outdoor concert stage; a restaurant and a cafe; large and small exhibit halls; an art gallery; a large playground, and a miniature railway. It also has a number of modern works of sculpture by Alexander Calder, Alicia Penalba and other artists, placed in different gardens around the park.

The park can be entered either from the Château de Vincennes, or from the Route de la Pyramide. Visitors entering from the Chateau de Vincennes pass through a forest of cedars and oaks to arrive at the central element of the composition, the Vallée des Fleurs, or Valley of Flowers. The varieties of flowers in the Valley of flowers are changed each year, according to a chosen theme. The Valley borders a lake, the Miroir d'eau, or water mirror, which is placed near the center of the park, with a modern fountain and series of cascades on one side. There are smaller ponds devoted to lily pads, lotus, and other aquatic plants. The large outdoor concert stage, the Delta, faces and dominates the lake.

Smaller flower gardens are scattered throughout the park; there is a garden to show varieties of the azalea; a large garden showcasing the rhododendron; a garden of ferns; gardens for irises and dahlias; a garden and pavilion for medicinal plants and culinary herbs; a garden for varieties of cactus; a garden of plants from the Mediterranean regions; and a large pavilion for displaying Japanese bonsai plants. There is also one garden, the jardin des Quatres-Saisons (Garden of the seasons) where flowers are in bloom year-round.
