= Beatrixpark =

Park in Amsterdam, Netherlands

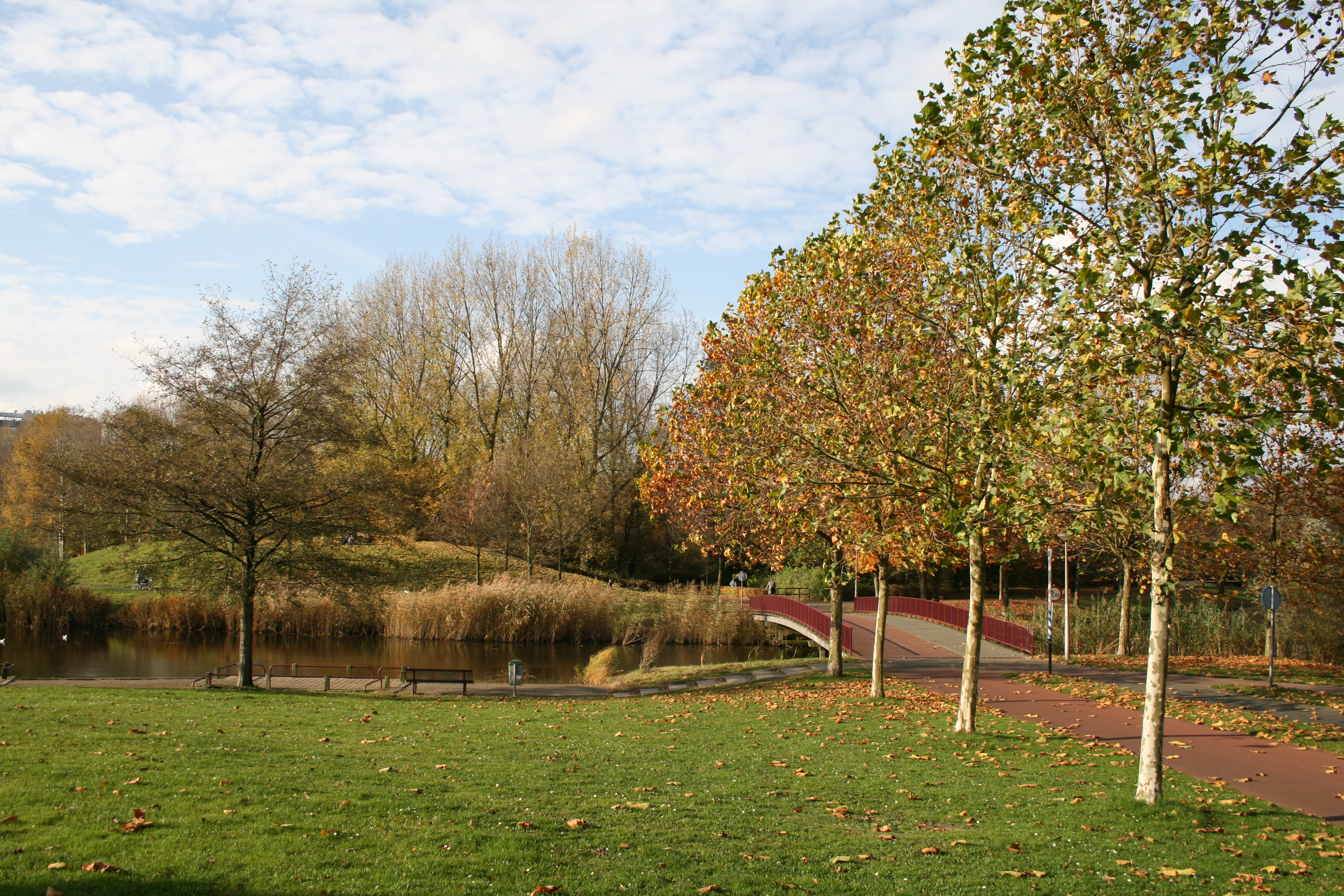
- The park and the cycle path De Groene Zoom
- Interactive map of Beatrixpark
- Type: Urban park
- Location: Amsterdam, Netherlands
- Coordinates: 52°20′34″N 4°52′55″E
- Area: 17 ha (42 acres)
- Created: 1938
- Operator: Amsterdam-Zuid
- Status: Open all year

The Beatrixpark is a park in the Amsterdam-Zuid borough and is located in the "Prinses Irenebuurt" residential area. The park was named after the former Dutch Queen Beatrix. In 1972, part of the park, together with the Amstelpark, was the site of the Floriade garden and agricultural exhibition.

== History ==
In 1932, the director of the Public Works proposed creating a park between the Scheldeplein square and the Beethovenstraat. In 1933, a plan for the park was drawn up and approved by the mayor in 1935. The decision was made to have the park created by unemployed people ("werkverschaffingsproject"). The costs were estimated at 300,000 guilders, which was accepted by the municipal council.

In May 1938, Beatrixpark was officially opened and is one of the oldest city parks in Amsterdam. The design for the oldest part of the park was by the Dutch architect Jakoba Mulder.

Initially, the park was called Park Zuid ("Park South"). In June 1938, it was already given the name Beatrixpark and during World War II, from 1942 to 1945, it was temporarily called "Diepenbrockpark". After 1945 it got its current name back.

The park has two bicycle paths, the Boerenweteringpad and the De Groene Zoom.

== Sightseeing ==
The Artsenijhof on the eastern side of the park was created during the Floriade and is a herb garden that consists of three parts. Hundreds of medicinal plants grow there.

The chestnut ring has young and very old chestnut trees.

The Pierenbad swimming pool is for young children and has, among other things, a bronze mermaid and a bronze mussel shell from which water flows. The swimming pool is open from May to the beginning of September and is supervised. Entry is free.

There is also a playground with a large sandpit. In 2006, the newspaper Het Parool voted the pool the "best Pierenbadje" in Amsterdam. There is also a lawn for relaxation.

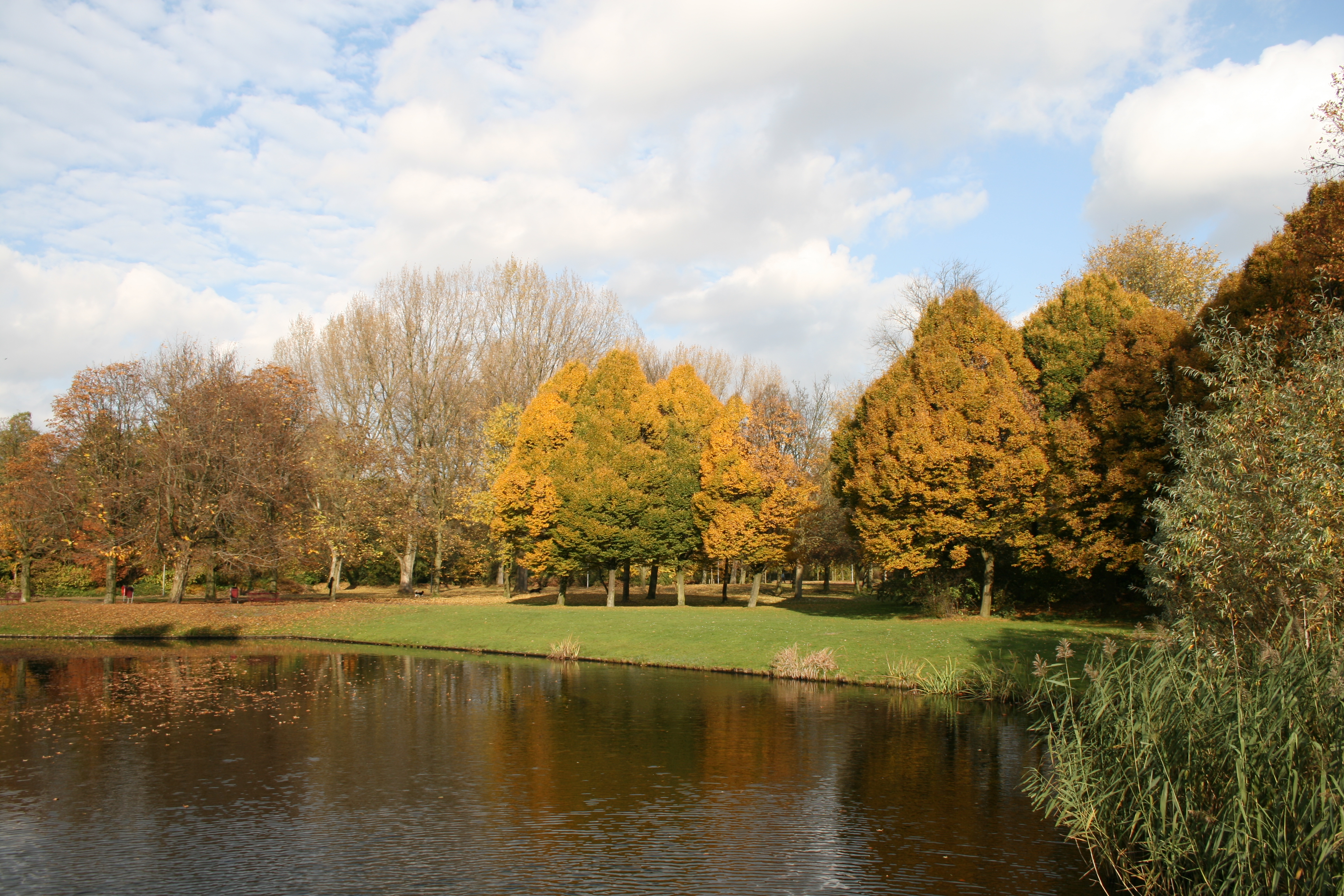
The park (Nov 2007)

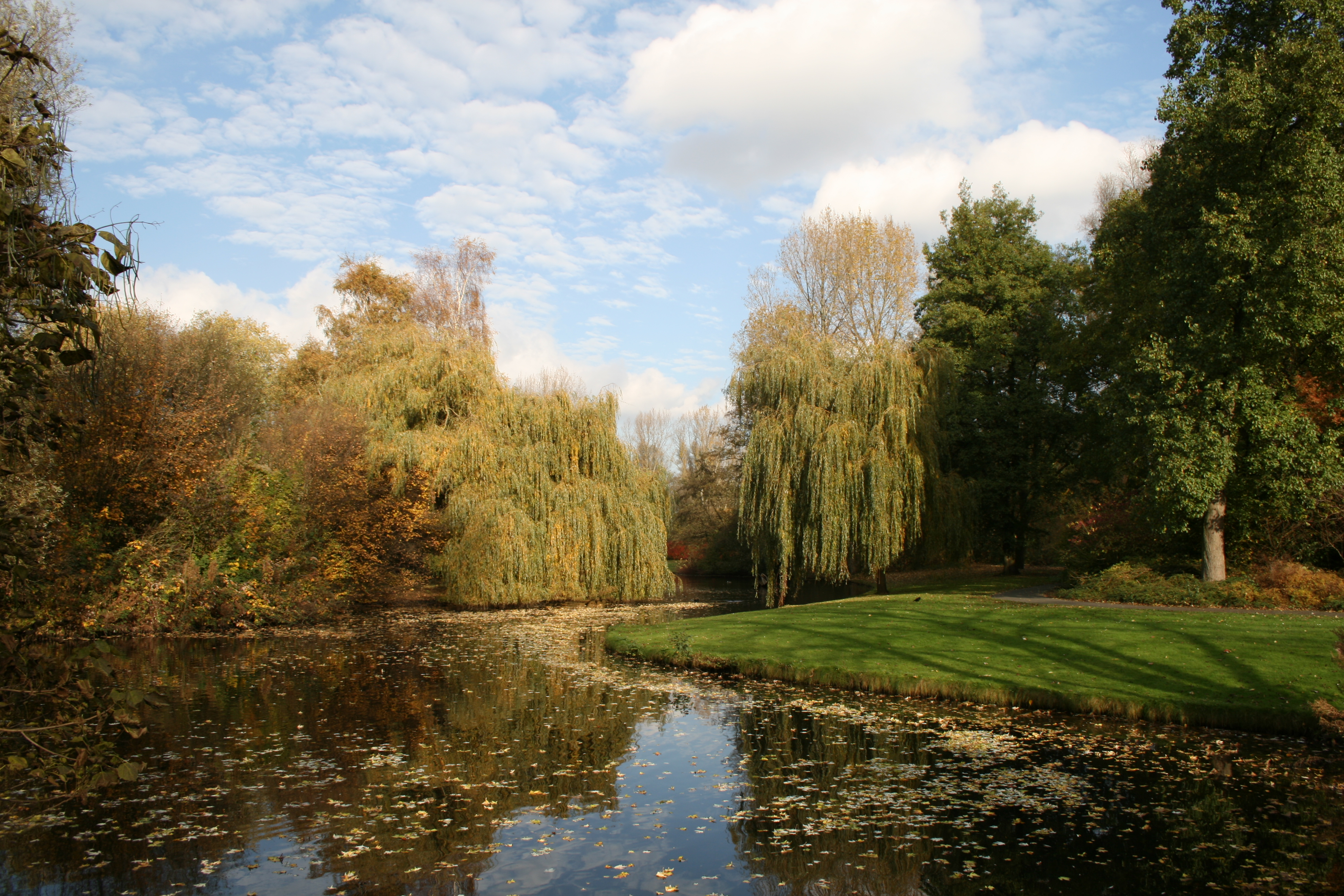
The park (Nov 2007)

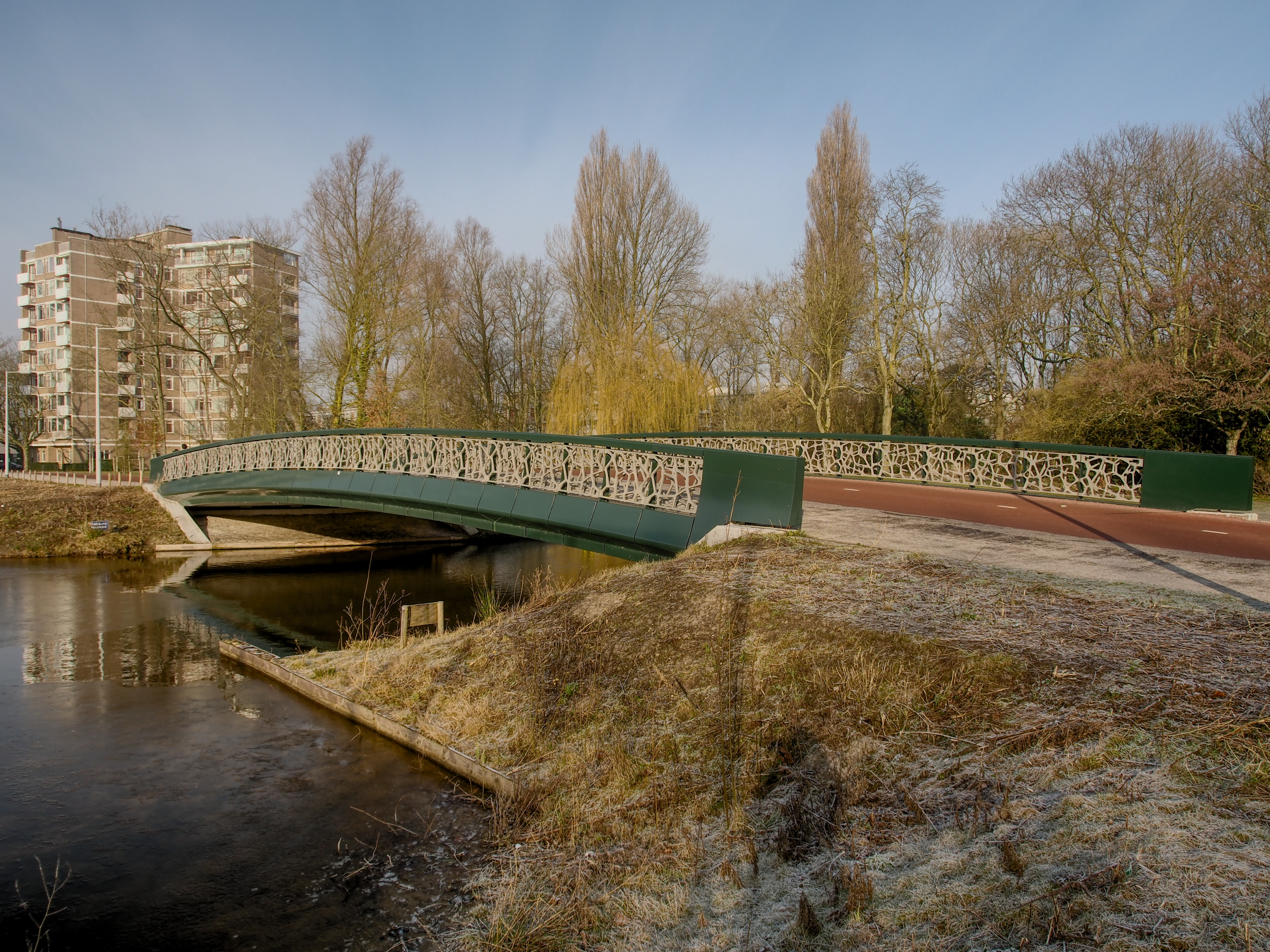
Prinses Irenebrug (Feb 2018)

== Monuments ==
Since 2005, the northern, most original, part of the Beatrixpark has been on the municipal monument list. This protects "the park layout, including the path structure, waterways and groves". The individual trees are unprotected.

There are several protected buildings on the edge of the park:

- Former St. Nicholas Monastery with chapel at Prinses Irenestraat 19 (municipal monument since 2014).
- Apartment building Parkhove at Beethovenstraat (149–155) (municipal monument since 2014).
- Princesseflat on the corner of Beethovenstraat (157–265)/Prinses Irenestraat (Mart Stam, 1961; national monument since 2014).
- Villa at Diepenbrockstraat 15 near Zuider Amstelkanaal (Frits Eschauzier, Delftse School, 1938; national monument since 2004).

== Festival ==
In 2009 and 2011, a music festival was held in Beatrix Park, including opera and theater performances. The big band Orquestra Bembe played salsa and jazz music. The music group Soul Express performed songs from the 1960s and 1970s. Children were able to take part in art activities during the festival.

== Rules ==
There are a few rules for visitors at the park. Dogs are not allowed. Open fires, for example for barbecues, are not permitted. Bicycles should be parked at the bike racks at the entrance of the park, unless they are being used on the bike paths. Alcohol consumption that leads to disruptive situations is prohibited.

Parks with the name Beatrixpark are also in the Dutch cities of Almere, 's-Hertogenbosch, Schiedam, Utrecht and Ede.

== Transport connections ==
The Beatrixpark can be reached by Amsterdam tram number 5. Stop Prinses Irenestraat.

== Literature ==
- Richter Roegholt: Amsterdam in de 20e eeuw. S. 69. Uitgevereij Spectrum 1979
- Merel Ligtelijn, Ernest Kurpershoek: Het Beatrixpark, Kroniek van een Amsterdams stadspark. Mit DVD. Uitgeverij Ginkgo, Leiden. ISBN 90-807009-4-0
