= Rembrandtpark =

Park in Amsterdam, the Netherlands

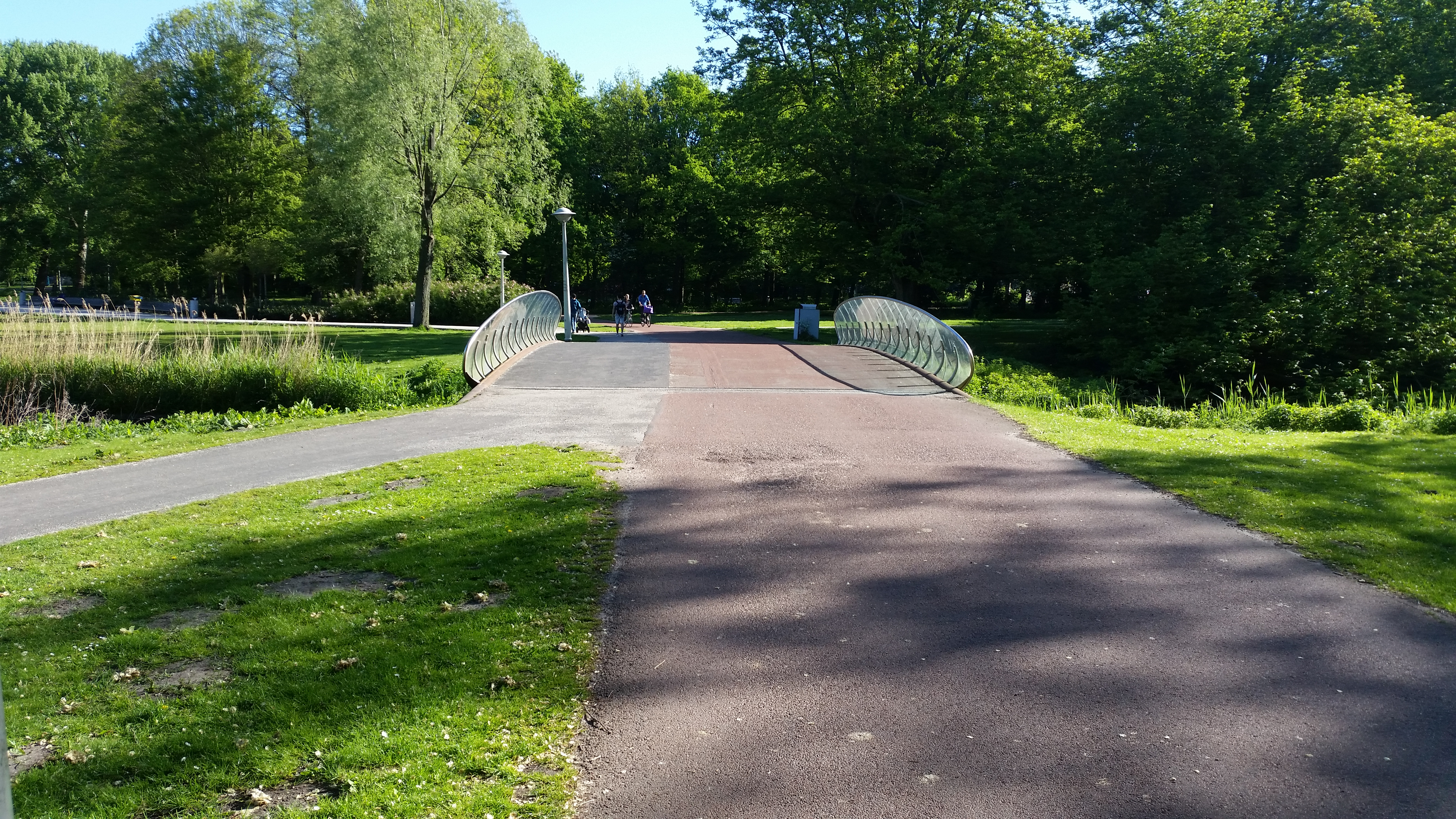
- Rembrandtpark in 2018

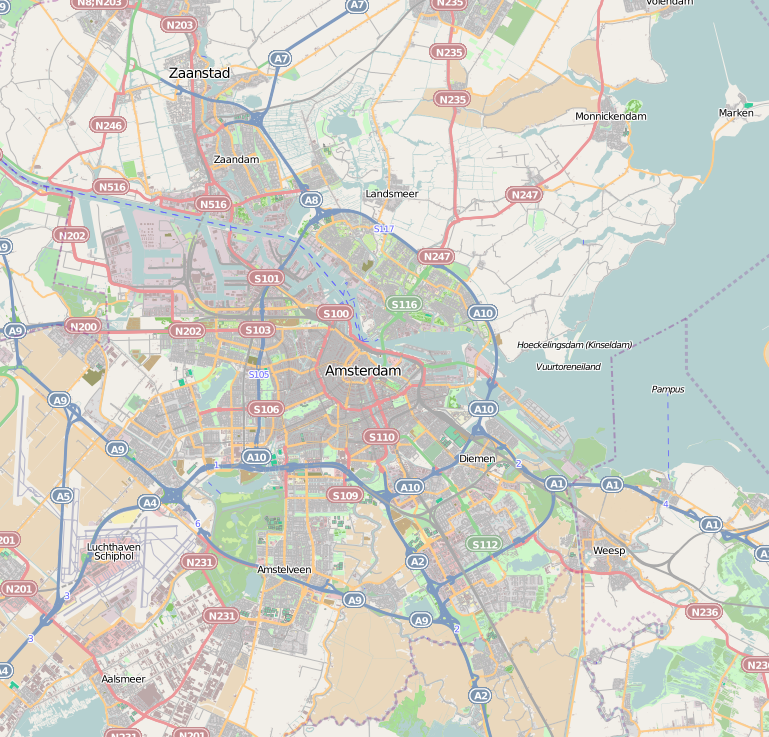
- Location within Greater Amsterdam
- Type: Urban park
- Location: Nieuw-West, Amsterdam, Netherlands
- Coordinates: 52°21′46″N 4°50′44″E
- Area: 45 ha (110 acres)
- Created: 1973
- Open: Year round

Rembrandtpark (Dutch pronunciation: [ˈrɛmbrɑntˌpɑr(ə)k]) is an urban park in Nieuw-West, Amsterdam, Netherlands. The park is named after the 17th-century painter Rembrandt. The park was completed in 1973 and has a surface area of 45 hectares (110 acres) which includes a petting zoo and playgrounds.

In the park, 37 bird species including the common buzzard (Buteo buteo), 35 bee species including the orange-horned nomad bee (Nomada fulvicornis), and 6 bat species including the pond bat (Myotis dasycneme) have been observed.

The park has been the site of several local festivals.

== Development ==
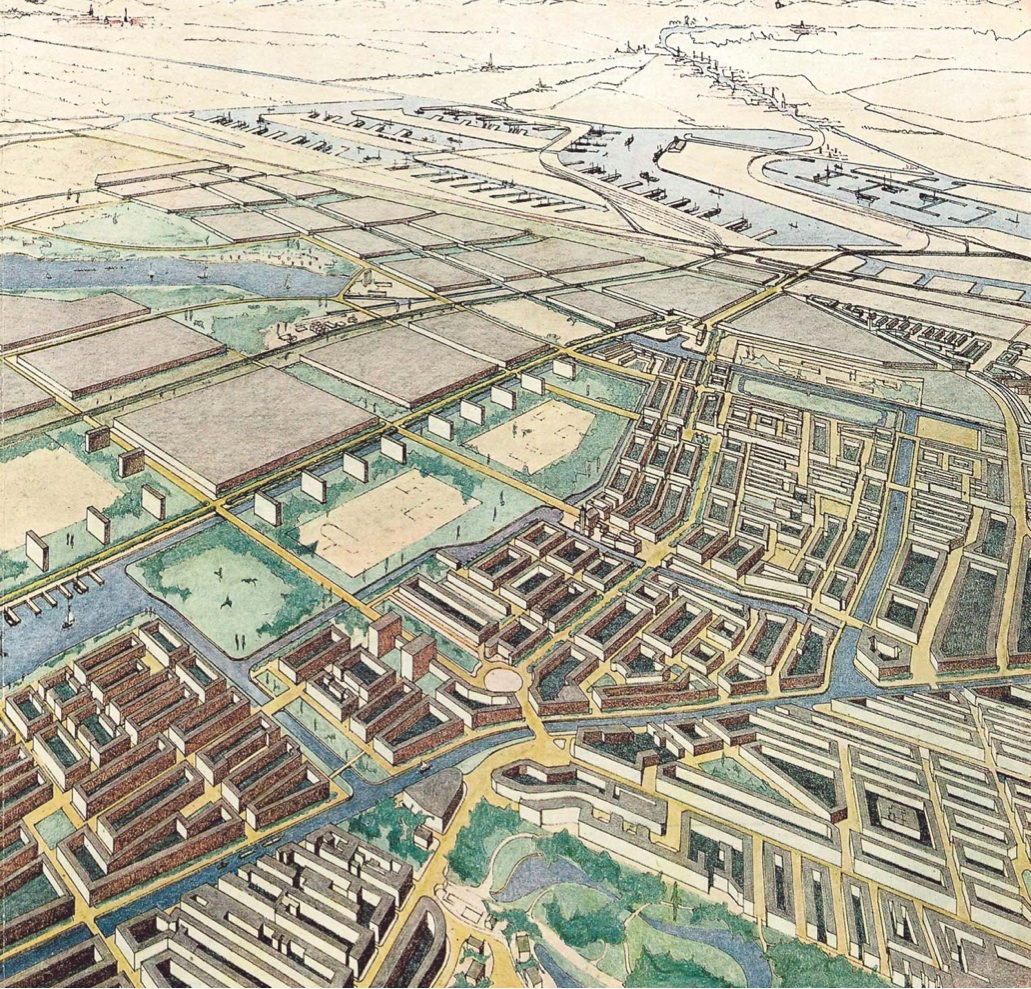
The park in the center of an artist impression of Cornelis van Eesteren's General Expansion Plan from 1935

In 1929, Cornelis van Eesteren made a provisional plan for the expansion of Amsterdam, which contained a park between the existing and planned neighbourhoods. In 1935, Van Eesteren made the General Expansion Plan which determined the current size and location of the park based on guidelines of 5.3 m^{2} (57 sq ft) of park area and 11.2 m^{2} (121 sq ft) of recreational area per inhabitant.

In the 1960s, the ground was elevated. In 1961, Egbert Mos of the municipality made a design for the park, but this was not realized because of insufficient budget.

In 1970, F. G. Breman of the municipality and landscape architect Janneke Willemsen made a design for the park with an area for active recreation containing a wild garden, a school garden, a petting zoo, and a rough playground and an area for passive recreation. The construction costed ƒ 15,400,000 and was funded by selling ground in the western area of the park to build nine apartment buildings and two office buildings. In 1973, the park was completed.

== Geography ==
The park is situated in the neighbourhood of Overtoomse Veld in Amsterdam Nieuw-West on the eastern border with the neighbourhood of De Baarsjes in Amsterdam-West. The elongated park is crossed from east to west by the streets Jan van Galenstraat, Postjesweg, and Cornelis Lelylaan, which divides the park into four sections.
