= Frederik Hendrikplantsoen =

Park in Amsterdam, the Netherlands

Coordinates: 52.3788°N 4.8770°E

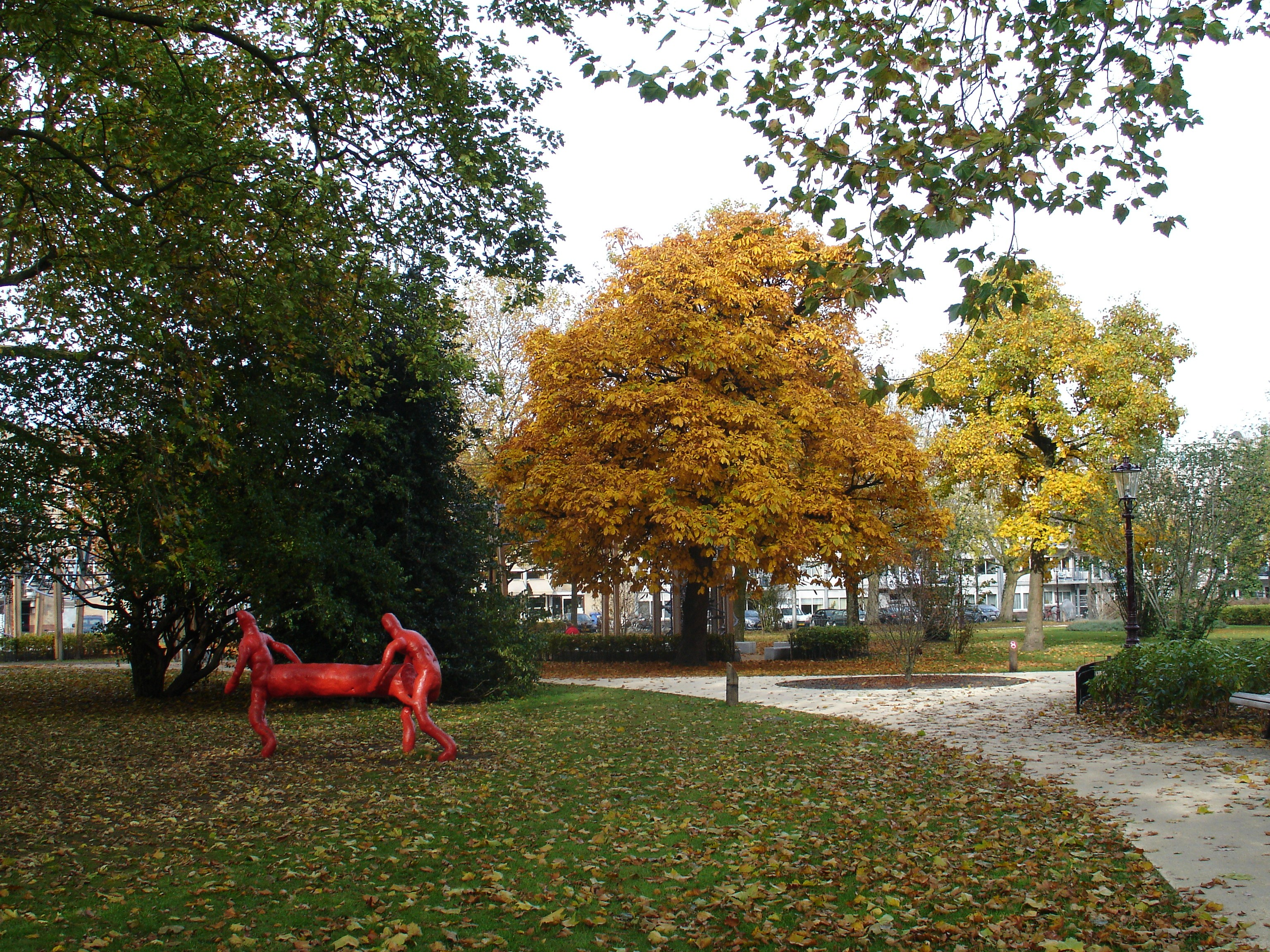
Frederik Hendrikplantsoen in the autumn

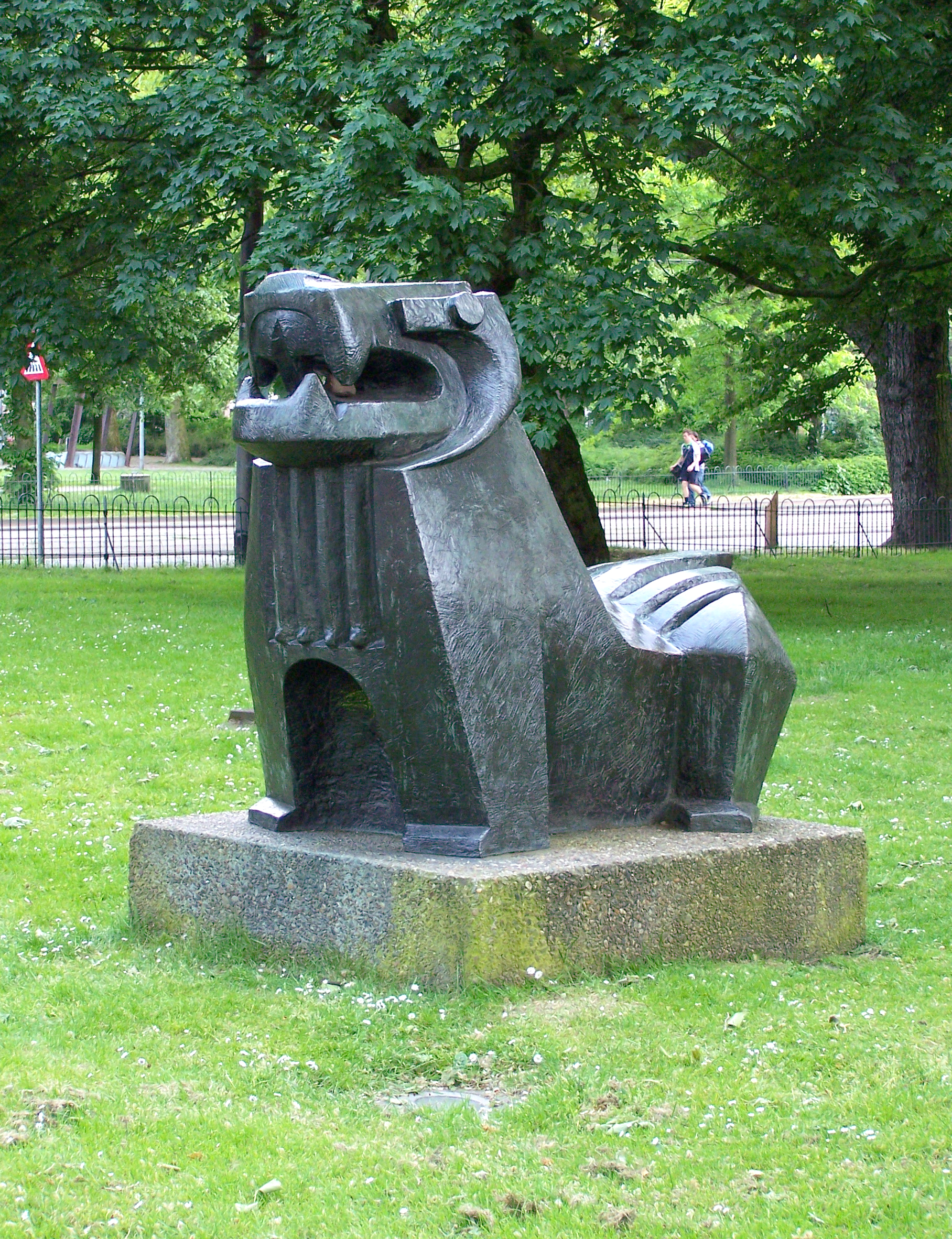
Pipe Dream, Cephas Stauthamer (1965)

Frederik Hendrikplantsoen is a park in Amsterdam West, on the edge of the Jordaan in one of the greenest historic neighbourhoods of Amsterdam. The park is located in the Frederik Hendrikbuurt Neighbourhood and has recently undergone extensive investment and redevelopment in consultation with the local community. It is notable for its sculpture group 'De Stam' or 'The Tribe' by Atelier van Lieshout.

== History ==
The park was chosen as a prominent location for Amsterdam's Liberation festivities in June 1945.
