= Frederik Hendrikbuurt =

Coordinates: 52°22′34″N 4°52′24″E

- Neighbourhood of Amsterdam
- Interactive map of Frederik Hendrikbuurt
- Country: Netherlands
- Province: North Holland
- Municipality: Amsterdam
- Time zone: UTC+1 (CET)
- Postal code: 1052

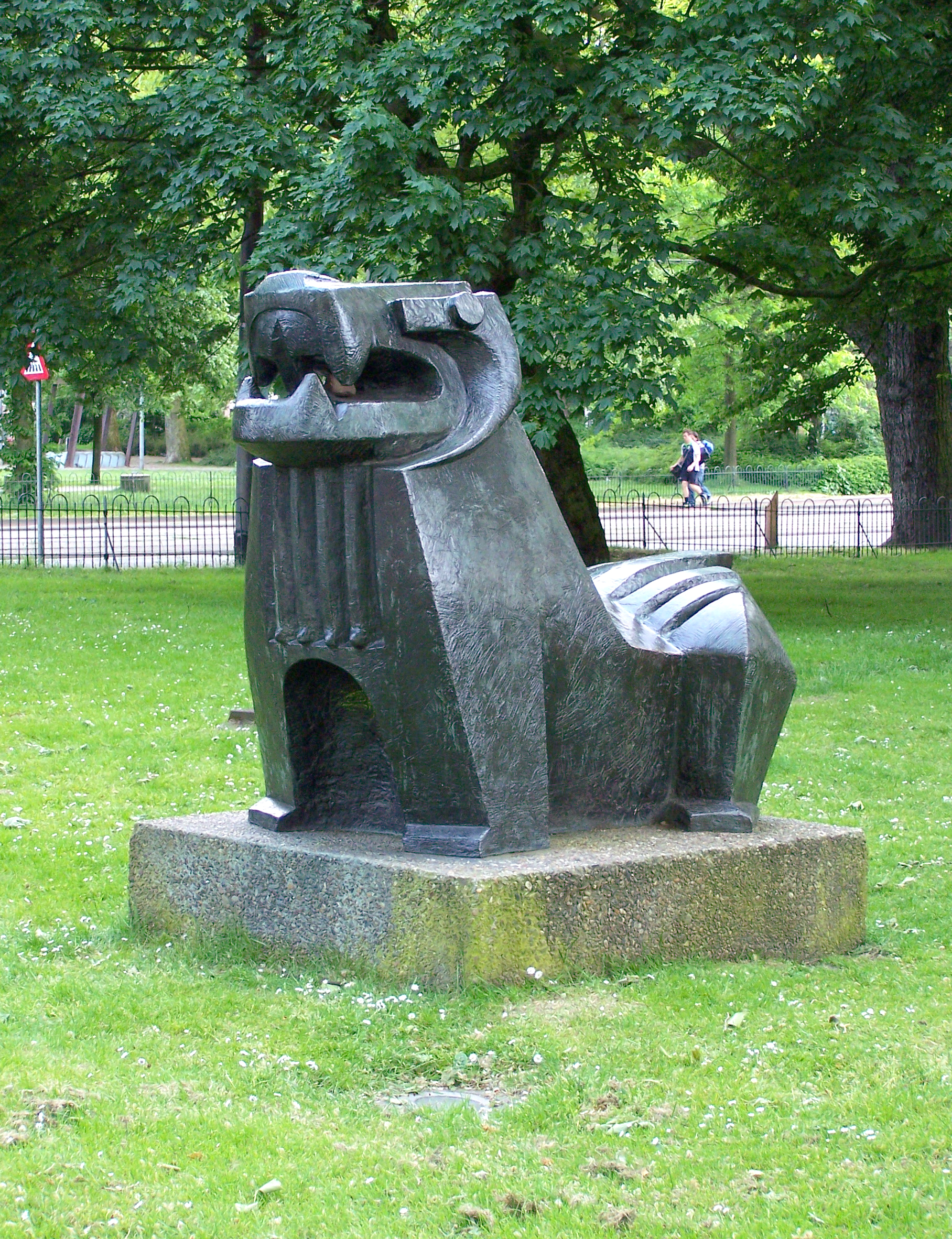
Pipe Dream, Cephas Stauthamer (1965)

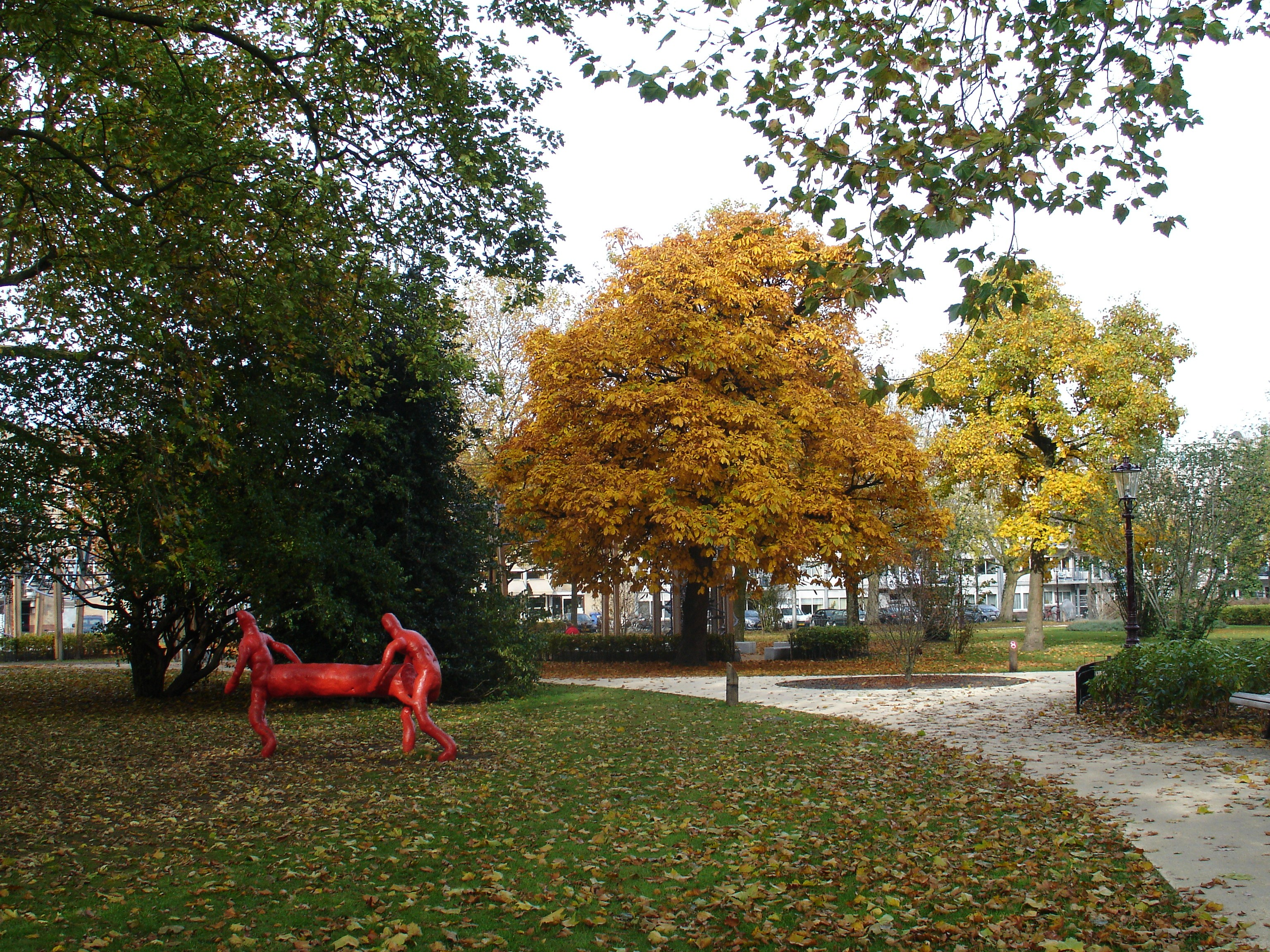
Frederik Hendrikplantsoen in the autumn

Frederik Hendrikbuurt is a neighbourhood in the West district of Amsterdam, Netherlands and is situated between the canals Singelgracht and Kostverlorenvaart. The neighbourhood, known locally by the moniker the "Fred", is centred on the Frederik Hendrikplantsoen park and was planned during the last quarter of the nineteenth century as a confluence of green space and housing meant to be stand apart from the overcrowded Jordaan district. The construction of the neighbourhood was mostly complete by the start of the Second World War (1940).

In the tradition of naming high-status areas after prominent figures, the neighbourhood is named after Frederik Hendrik (1584 - 1647); Prince of Orange, Count of Nassau, governor, captain-general and admiral-general of the Dutch Republic. Following this naming convention, prominent streets of the neighbourhood are similarly named after Hendrik's family. Most notable of these is the tree-lined Amaliastraat which takes its name from Hendrik's wife Amalia of Solms-Braunfels, Princess consort of Orange.

Between the seventeenth century and the end of the nineteenth century the area was the "Windmill District" or "Sawmill Area". There were many mills for sawing timber, for shipbuilding and housing. The remaining windmill "de Otter", which can still be found along the Kostverlorenvaart. was constructed in 1631 and is listed as a Rijksmonument.
