= Amstelpark =

Park in Amsterdam-Zuid, Netherlands

Coordinates: 52.329°N 4.894°E

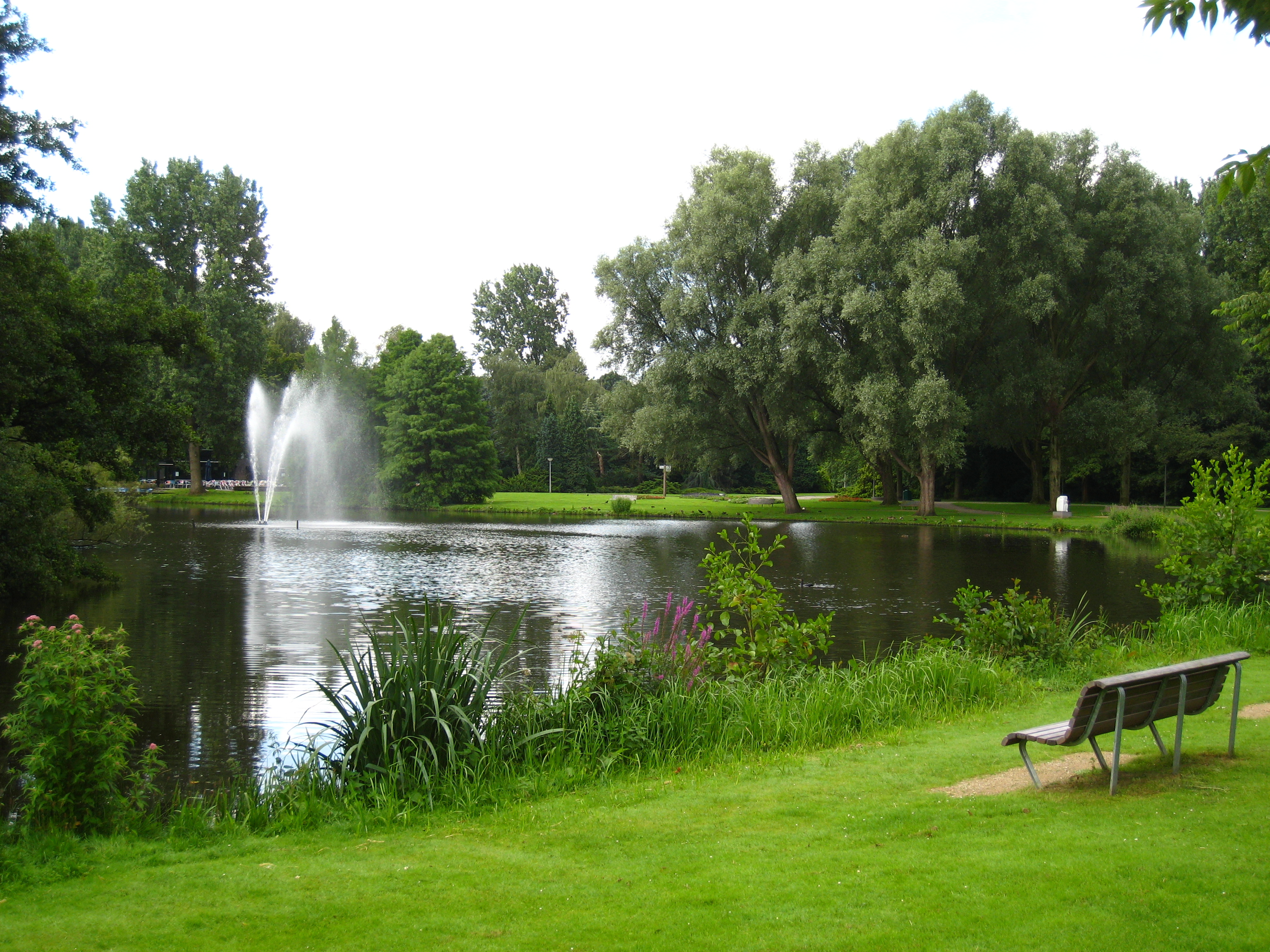
Amstelpark, 2007

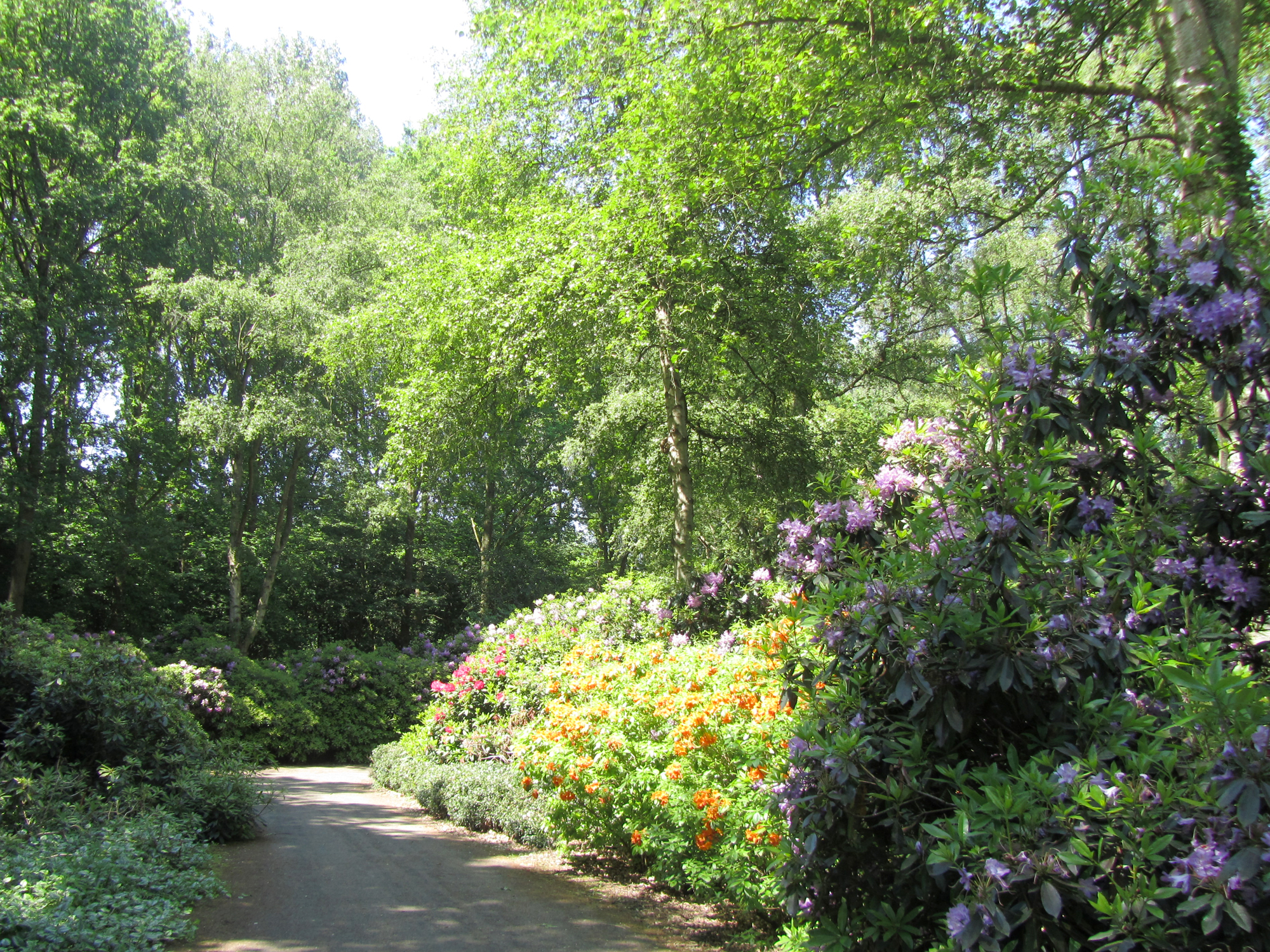
Rhododendron garden in the Amstelpark

The Amstelpark is a park in Amsterdam-Zuid. The park includes a labyrinth, a café, a restaurant, two galleries, an orangery, a petting zoo and a mini-golf course.

== Background ==
The Amstelpark was built and opened for the 1972 Floriade gardening exhibition. The park has its own train line, the Amstel train, which runs through the Rosarium, the rhododendron valley and the Riekermolen.

The park contains a variety of plant species from around the world, including a "rhododendron valley" with about 139 species of rhododendrons, blooming in April and May. At one point, the park lost about 30 percent of its larger trees due to disease.

The park contains a Japanese Garden, which was renovated in 2001 at the time of the celebration of the 400-year relationship between the Netherlands and Japan.

The Riekermolen windmill lies south of the Amstelpark. Built in 1636 it originally stood in the Riekerpolder near Sloten. In 1932 it was replaced by a motorized pumping station. The mill was removed in 1956 when the Nieuwe Meer was enlarged as a sand pit. The city council decided to rebuild the mill on the west side of the Amstel in 1961. A statue of Rembrandt is located next to the windmill. He often sketched the landscape along the Amstel river.
