= Fréjus Cathedral =

Cathedral in Fréjus, France

Saint-Léonce de Fréjus Sainte-Léonce de Fréjus
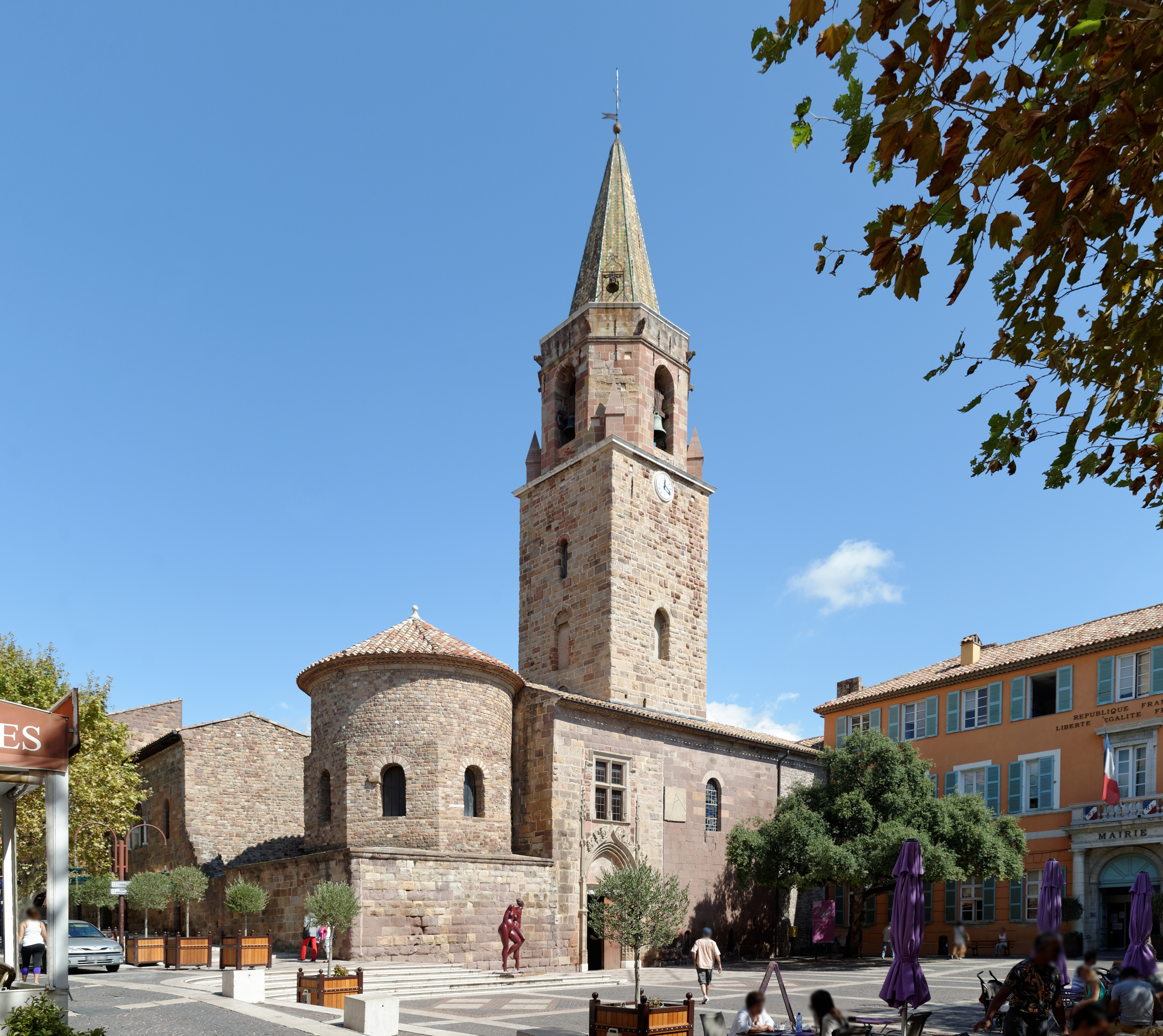
- View of Frejus Cathedral

Religion
- Affiliation: Catholic Church
- Province: Provence-Alpes-Côte d'Azur
- Ecclesiastical or organisational status: Parish church, former Cathedral

Location
- Interactive map of Saint-Léonce de Fréjus; Sainte-Léonce de Fréjus
- Coordinates: 43.433174°N 6.736751°E

Architecture
- Type: church
- Style: Romanesque
- Groundbreaking: 5th century
- Completed: 16th century

Fréjus Cathedral (French: Cathédrale Saint-Léonce de Fréjus) is a Roman Catholic church located in the town of Fréjus in the Var department of Provence, southeast France, and dedicated to Saint Leontius of Fréjus.

The cathedral was the seat of the Bishop of Fréjus from the 5th century. The diocese was abolished in 1801 but restored in 1822 under bull Paternae charitatis. In 1957, the Diocese of Fréjus was united with that of Toulon to form the present Diocese of Fréjus-Toulon, with its seat at Toulon Cathedral. Since then, Fréjus Cathedral has been a co-cathedral in the new diocese.

The church is part of a complex of medieval religious buildings dating from between the 5th and 13th centuries, when Fréjus was an important religious and commercial centre of Provence. It includes a parish church and a cathedral under one roof; a baptistery; the bishop's residence; a canonry, for the community of priests who served under the bishop; and a cloister. The baptistery of the cathedral is a fine example of early Christian or Merovingian architecture. It was built in the 5th century but hidden during later reconstruction, and was rediscovered in 1925 by French architect Jules Formigé. It is considered the oldest Christian structure in Provence and one of the oldest in France.

It was declared a French monument historique in 1862.

== History ==
Fréjus, founded by Julius Caesar, had been an important Roman port and capital of Provence. The existence of a Christian community is documented as early as 374, but it is not known where they worshipped. The foundation of the cathedral is traditionally attributed to Saint Leontius of Fréjus, bishop of Fréjus (ca. 419-ca. 488). During his time the first monastery in the region, Lérins Abbey, was also founded.

The cathedral is located close to what appears to have been the Roman forum of Fréjus; the ruins of monumental buildings have been found next to the cathedral under the garden of the former hospital, now the Palais de Justice. It was also near the cardo maximus, the principal north–south axis of Roman towns; its walls were aligned with the sites of earlier Roman villas; and elements of Roman buildings, such as columns and walls, were incorporated into its structure. The north wall of a Roman villa dating to the period of the Emperor Augustus (1st century BC – 1st century AD) was re-used as the foundation of the south wall of the baptistry of the cathedral, while the south wall of the same villa became a part of the south facade of the Bishop's palace until its demolition in the 13th century.

Beginning in late Roman times, the town suffered a series of invasions and was pillaged by Goths, Burgundians, Franks, Lombards and Saracens. A plague carried away much of the population in the 6th century. In the 10th century, Saracen pirates ravaged the coast. The expulsion of the Saracens in 972 brought a period of relative peace.

In the 12th century, Fréjus was governed jointly by the Viscount of Fréjus, who had a castle near the port, and by the bishop, whose palace was next to the cathedral. The town had shrunk considerably since Roman times – whereas the Roman walls had enclosed fifty hectares, the medieval walls of the 12th century enclosed only five hectares.

At the end of the 12th century, the Count of Provence asserted his authority over both the church and state. He nominated the bishops of Fréjus, while the local nobles lost power. The 13th century saw considerable enlargement and modification to the cathedral. A bell-tower and porch was erected on the west side of the cathedral, on the axis of the nave, a distinctive feature of Provençal architecture of that period. The high tower gave the cathedral a more military appearance. The church received a new chevet at the east end, as well as additions to the bishop's palace and a chapter hall.

The Cathedral of Notre Dame, governed by the bishop, was rebuilt with new vaults between the bell tower and west porch and the chevet. The new vaults rested on massive pillars. and had unusual arches, of a type called "Lombard"; unlike the traditional Romanesque barrel vault; these vaults were supported by rounded arches between the side arcades; segmented arches, with less than a half-circle for the ogives, and arches with greater than a half-circle for the doubleaux. This was an intermediate step between Romanesque and the emerging Gothic style. The adjoining parish Church of St. Stephen received a similar enlargement, with the addition of three new traverses covered with more traditional barrel vaults, to match the older part of the nave, and a new vault of the choir in the Lombard style.

In the 13th century, as the Gothic style gradually became popular, the cathedral was modified further, bringing the two separate naves closer together. The arcades separating them were widened], but nonetheless the two sides continued to have separate altars.

The period of prosperity did not last long. The old Roman road, the Via Aurelia, was abandoned; and the old Roman port gradually silted up and became an unhealthy swamp, carrying fever and disease to the town. Aside from a brief economic revival in the sixteenth century, which saw the building of a new city wall, Fréjus lost its economic importance, and the bishopric was moved in 1751 to Draguignan. By 1765 the population had declined to 2,000 people.

Fréjus saw a new growth in population at the beginning of the 20th century, caused by a large immigration of Italians, and later growth caused by increasing tourism in the region. Today the population is about 47,000.

== Plan ==
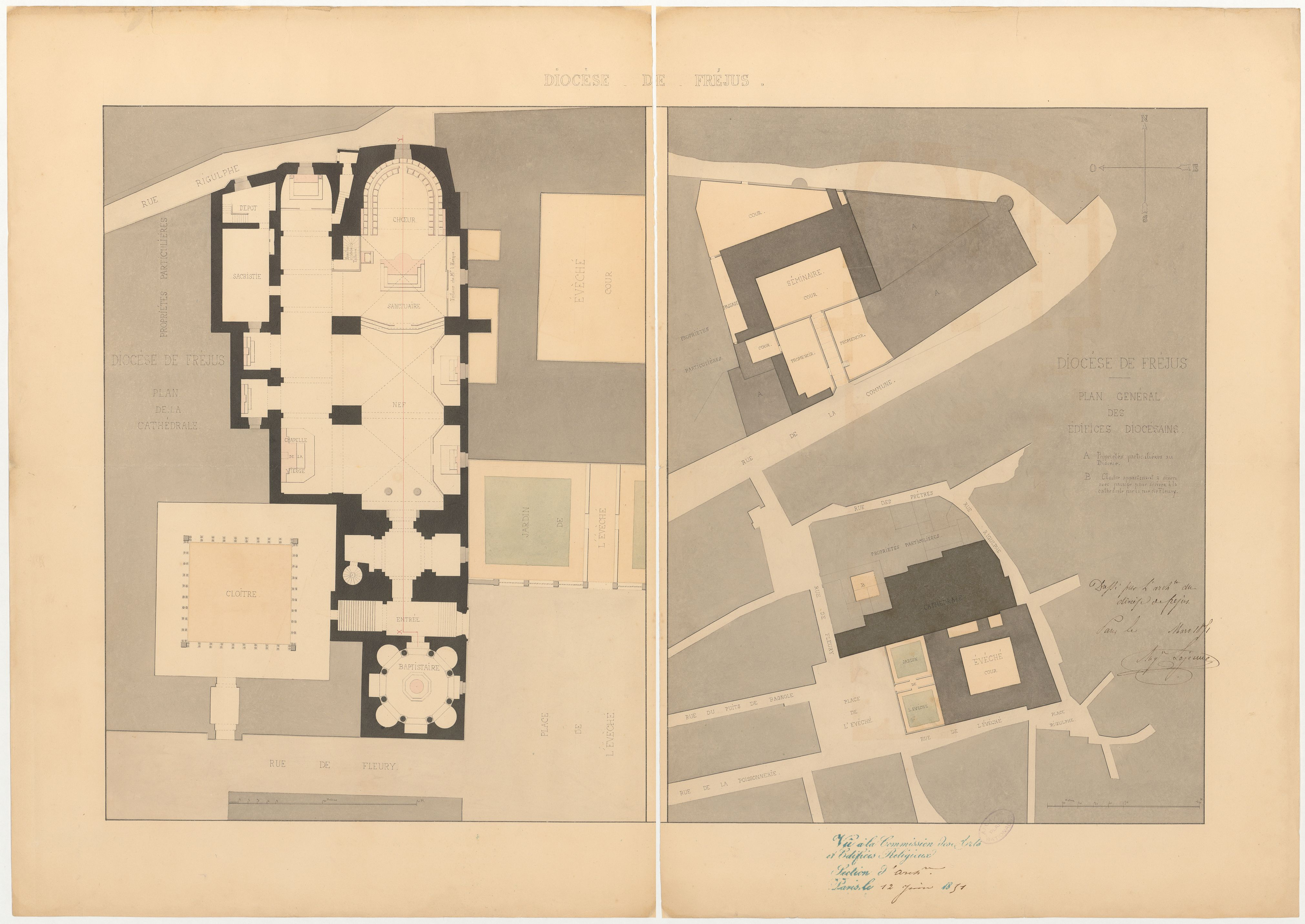
Plan of the cathedral and diocese buildings (1851). Baptistry is at bottom center, cloister to bottom left

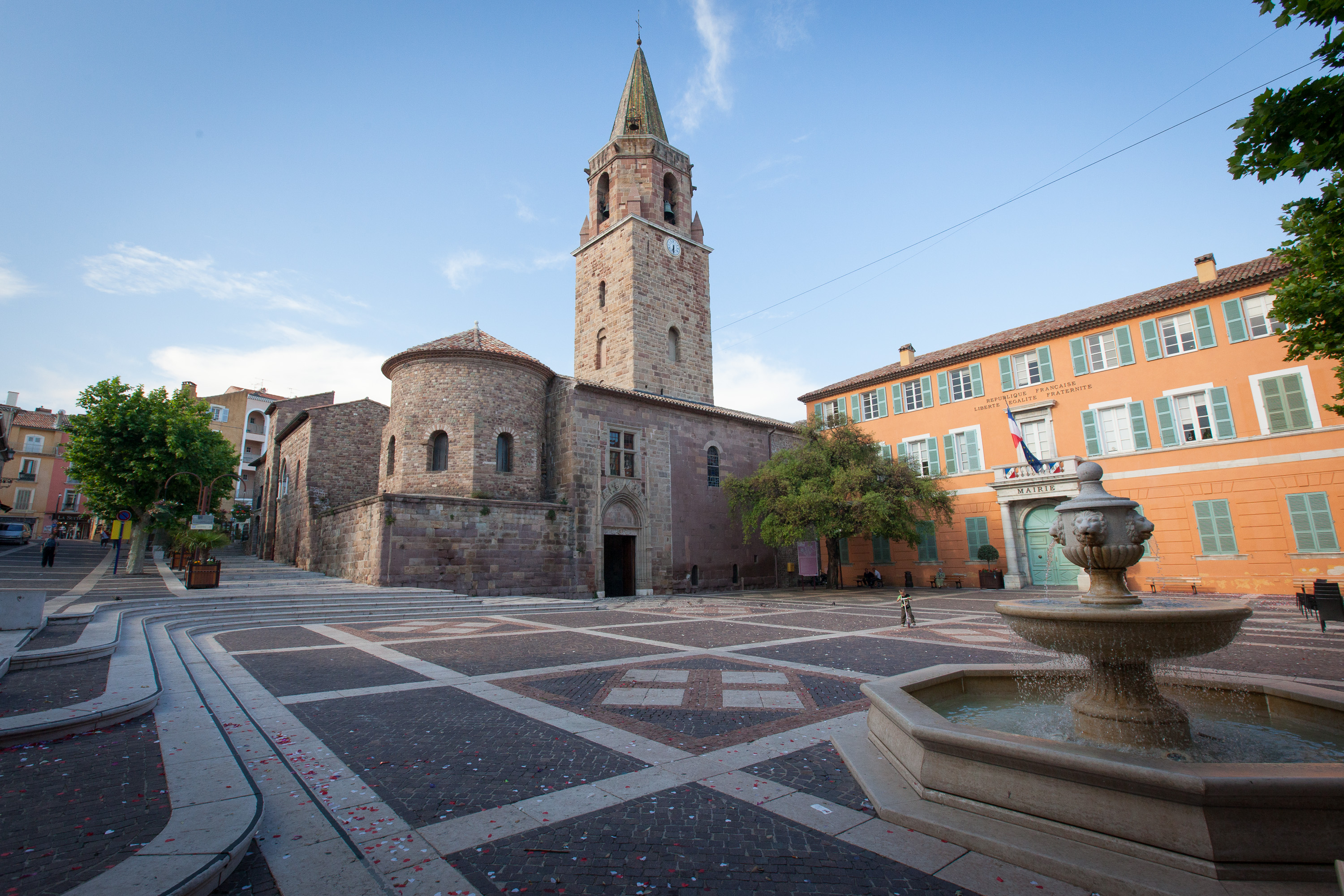
The baptistry (left), cathedral (center) and town hall (right), which incorporates parts of the old bishop's residence

== Baptistery ==
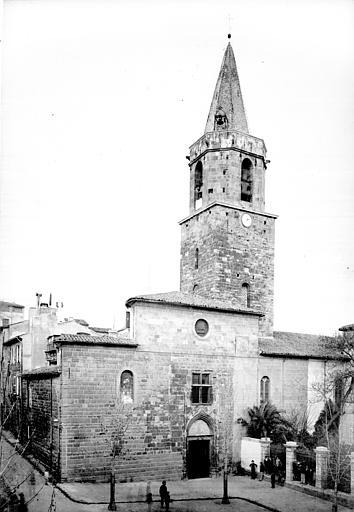
Exterior of the Baptistry in 1882, before it was uncovered

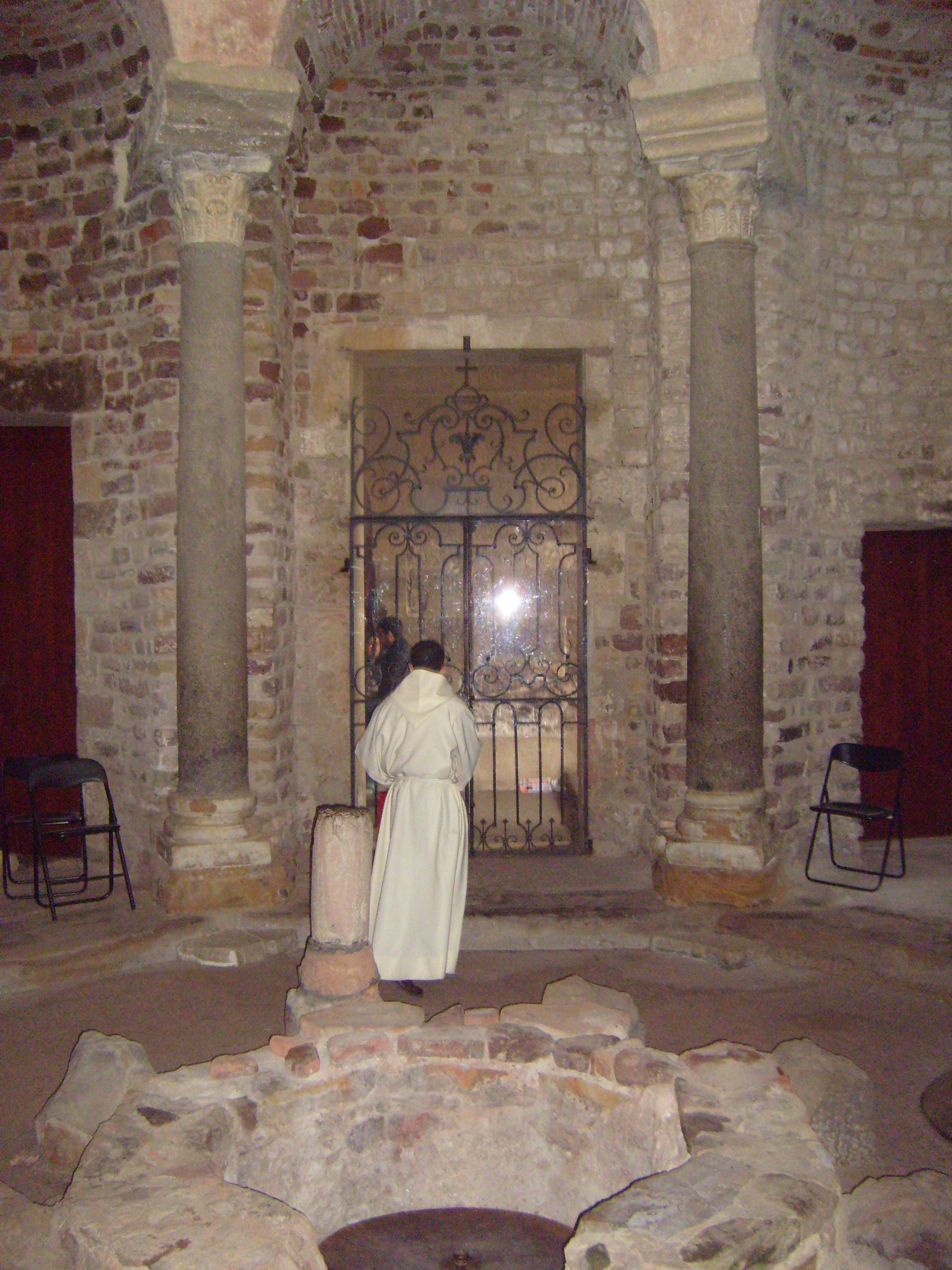
The 5th century baptistery, still in use

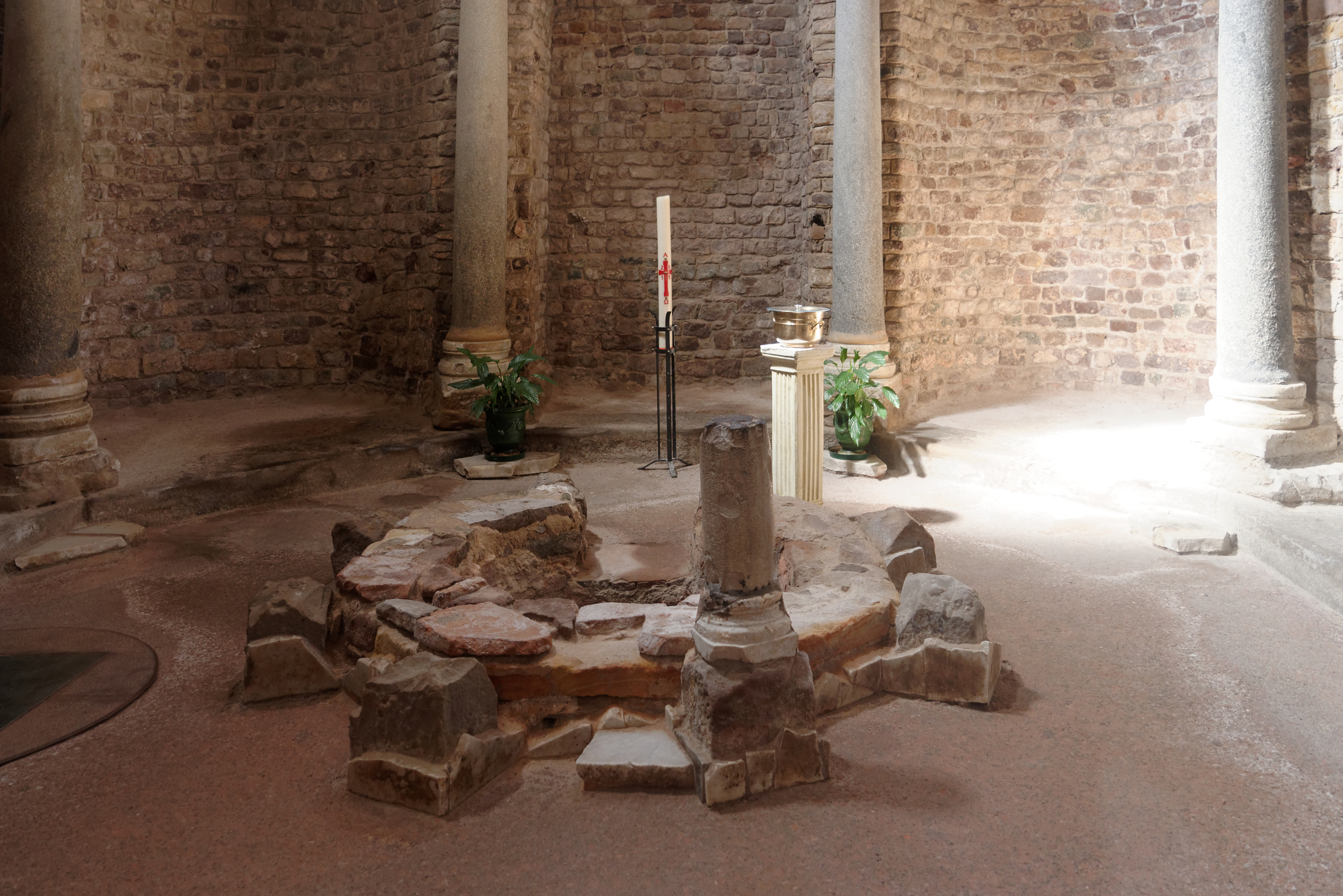
The baptismal font, large enough for a person to be immersed

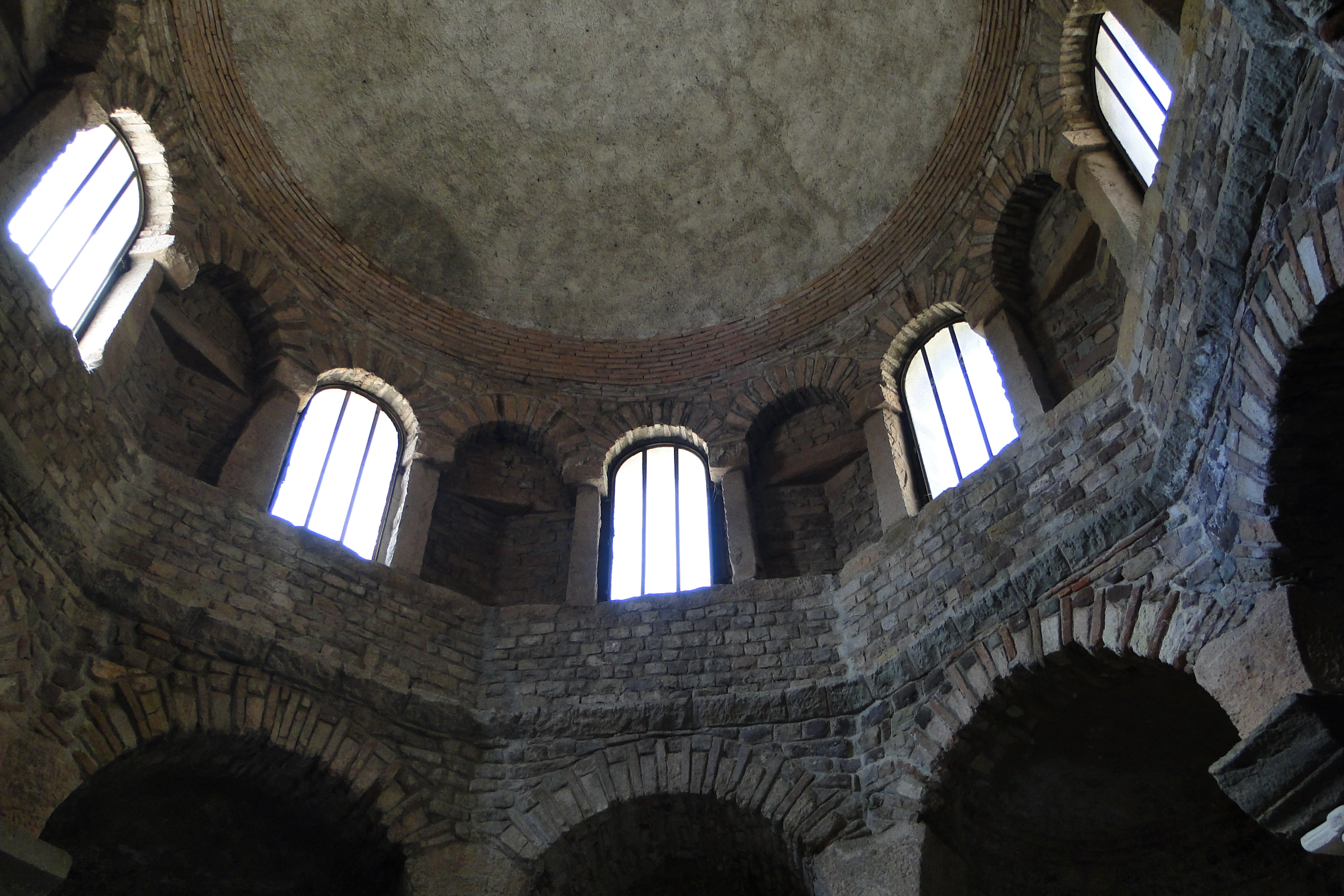
Cupola of the baptistery

The baptistery is the oldest part of the cathedral, dating to the 5th century. It is similar in form to the Lateran Baptistery in Rome, built in 440, and the baptistry at Albenga Cathedral in Liguria. the same period. On the exterior, the lower part is a square, about eleven meters to a side. On top of that is a domed octagonal structure. In the interior, the lower level is divided into eight deep arched niches, alternating between semicircular niches and those with flat walls, with the arches resting on columns. The columns support the upper level, which has sixteen small arched niches with windows, which in turn support the dome. Some of the granite columns predate the church, and were probably taken from Roman temples; other columns were made at the same time as the baptistery.

In the centre of the floor is the octagonal baptismal basin, large enough for a person to be entirely immersed, surrounded by a stone ledge. A smaller basin is located in the floor nearby, either for the baptism of infants or for washing the feet of the priest.

In the 13th century, the baptistery was surrounded by a new wall, and the baptismal basin was covered over. It was rediscovered in the 1920s by Jules Formigé, the Inspector of French Historical Monuments, and the interior was restored during the 1930s to what he believed to be its original appearance.

== Vestibule ==
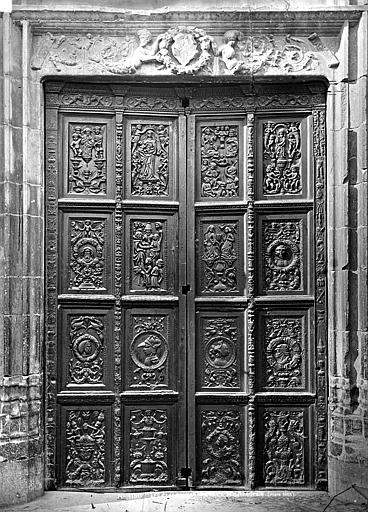
The sculpted wood doors of the vestibule (1530)

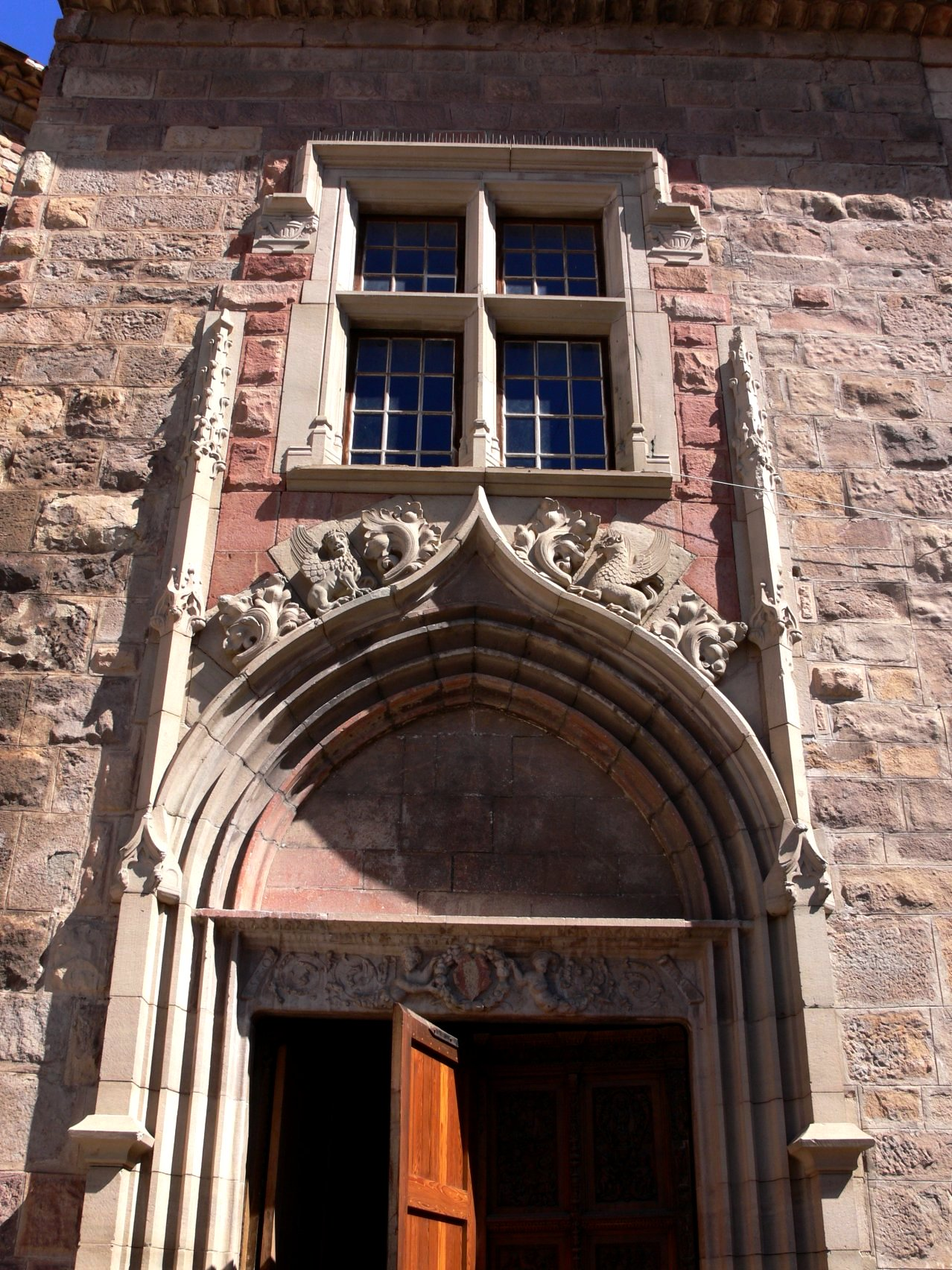
accolade arch and decoration of the south doorway (1530)

The baptistry was not originally connected directly with the nave. The principal entrance to the nave was on the north side of the church, reached by passing through the cloister. This was due to the difference in elevation between the floor of the cathedral and the higher ground outside. A cemetery was located outside the south of the baptistery and nave. In 1530 the cemetery was transferred outside the church complex and the space became a public square. Then a new entrance and vestibule to the church was built to the south. A large altar, devoted to Saint Honorat, was placed against the north wall of the vestibule, and the south portal was given a very fine door of carved walnut wood. The upper floor of the vestibule became the chapter hall.

The decoration of the south doorway, built in 1530, with its pointed gable, or accolade arch, with pinnacles and sculptural decoration, is one of the rare touches of late Gothic architecture in the cathedral.

== The two naves and choirs ==
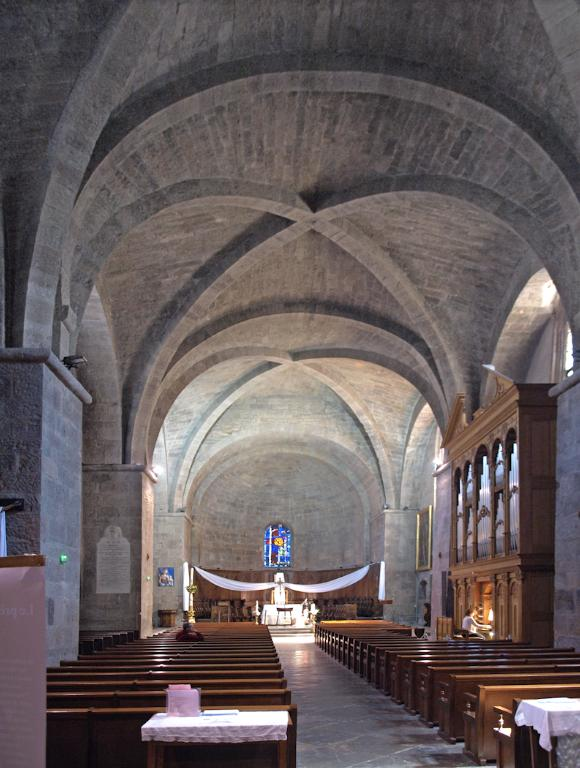
Lombard vaults of the nave of Notre Dame, the Bishop's cathedral

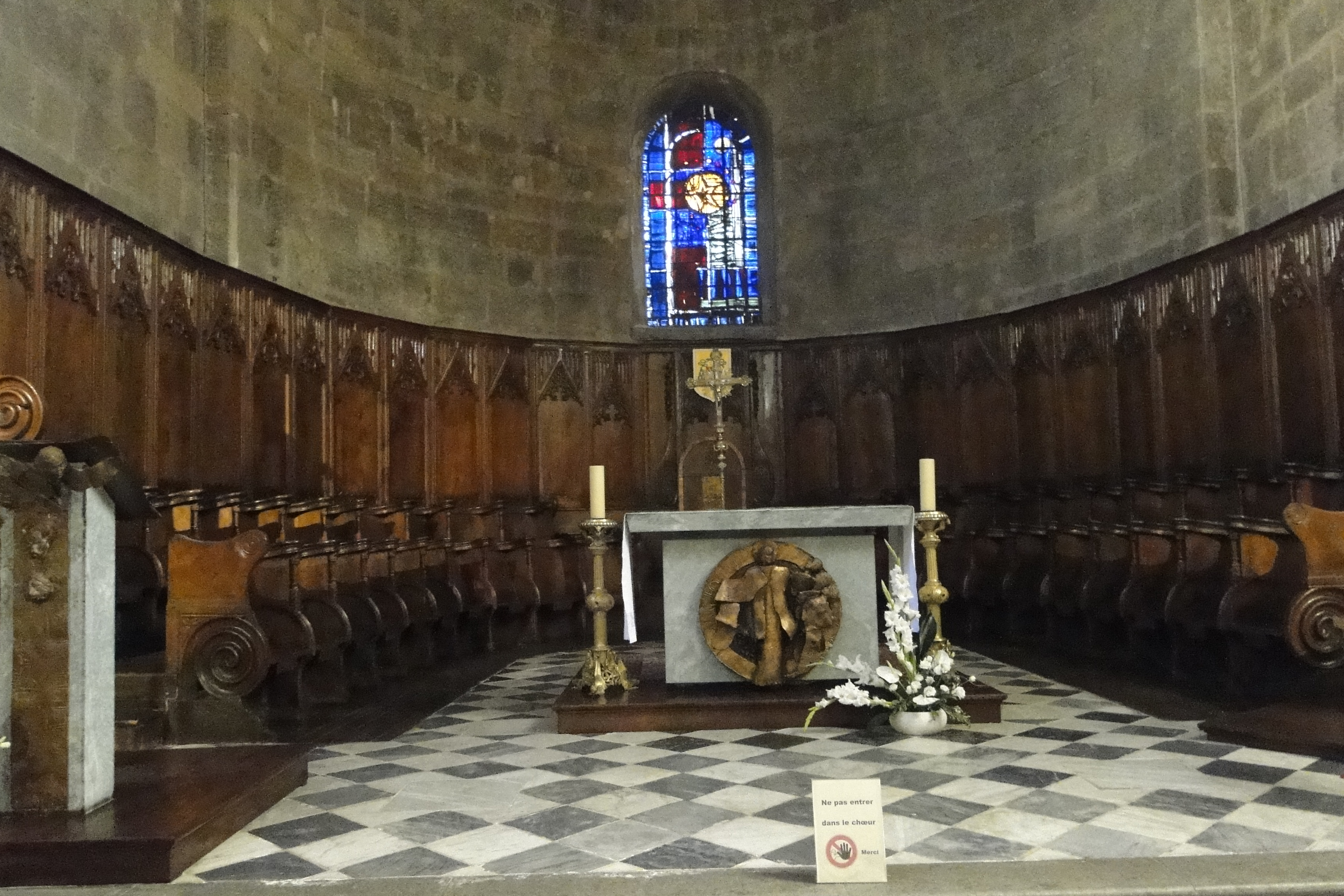
The Nave and choir stalls of Notre-Dame

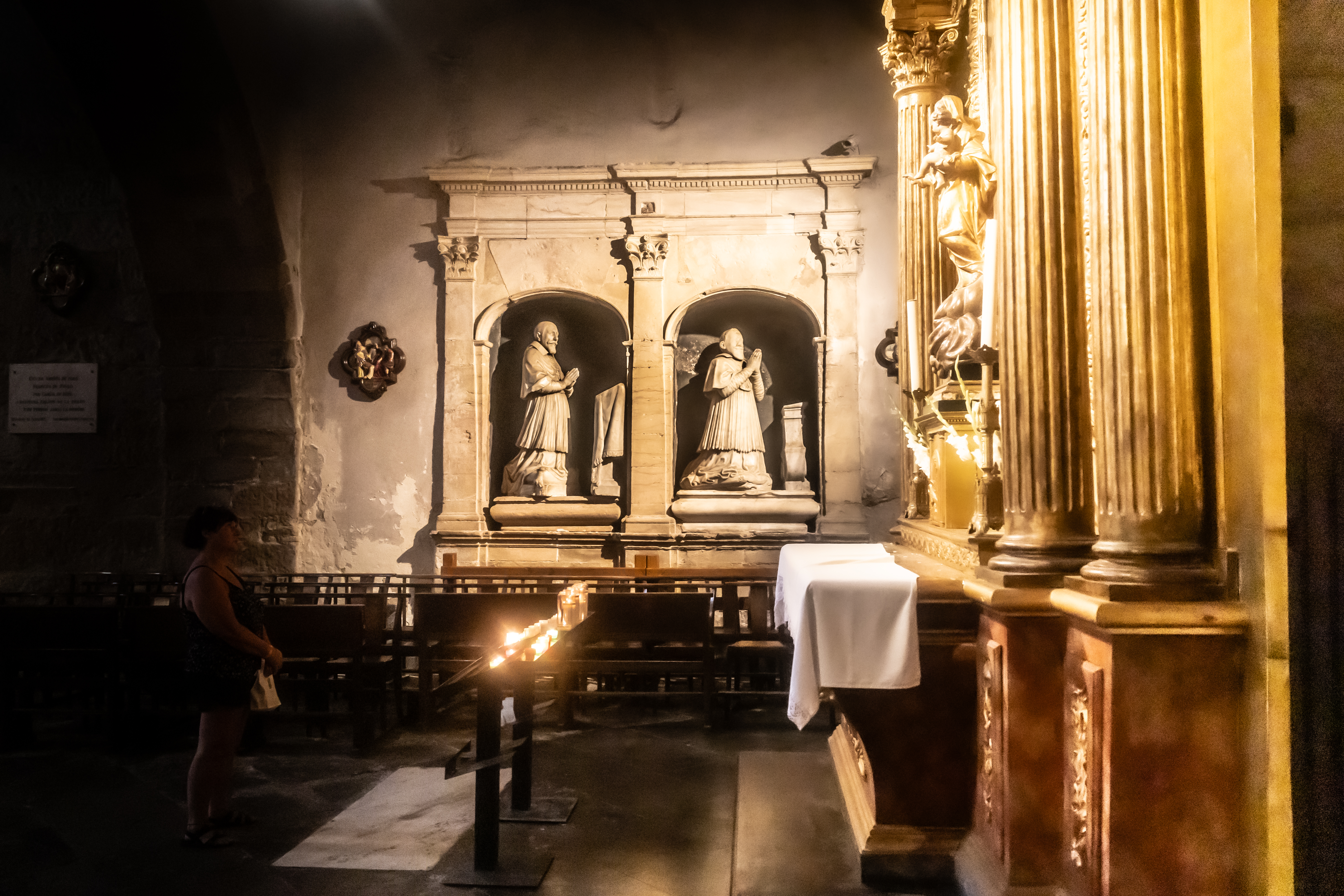
Interior of the cathedral

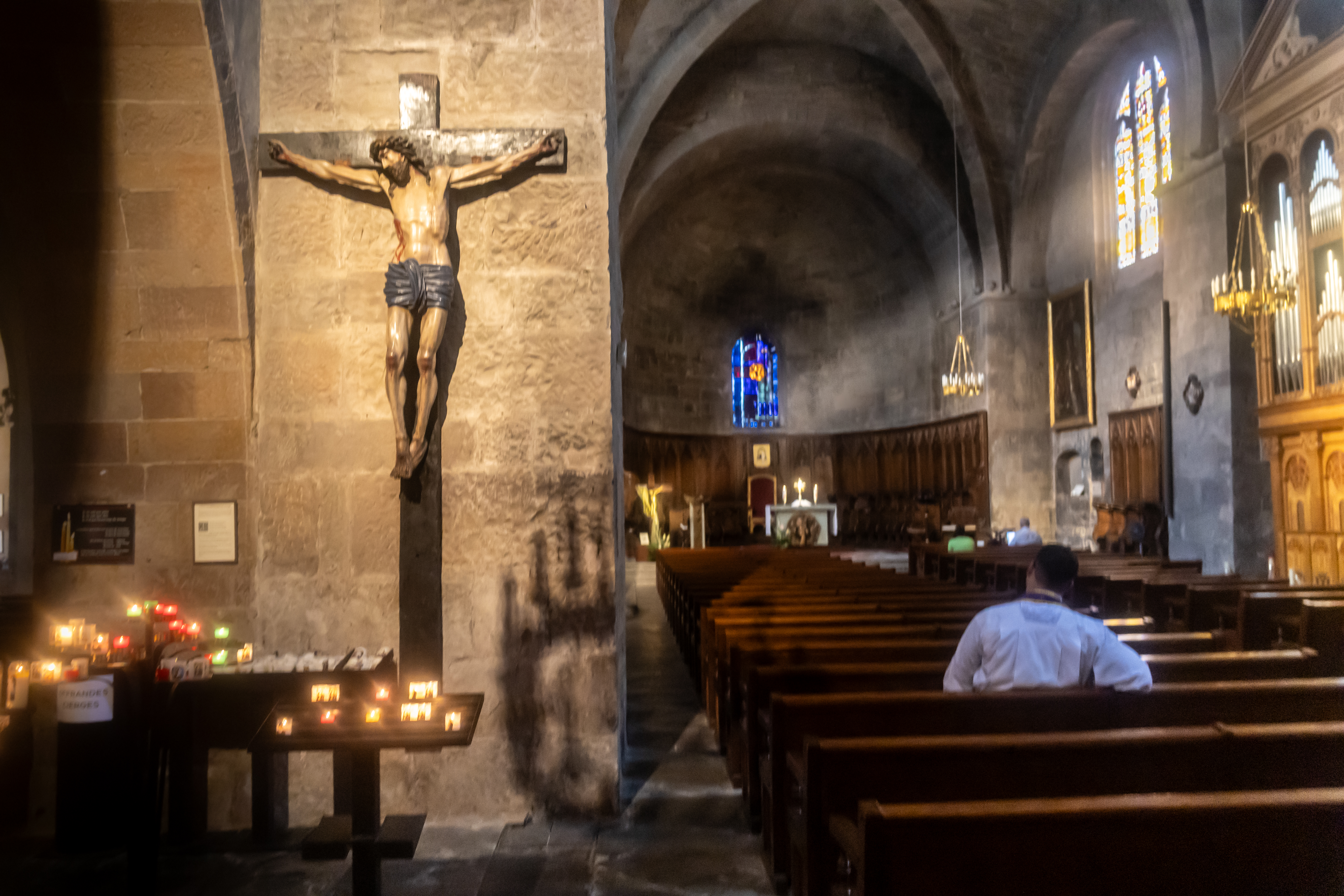
Interior of the cathedral Frejus

The cathedral contains two separate churches under the same roof; one, the Church of S. Etienne (Saint Stephen], is the local parish church; and the other, the Eglise Notre-Dame, belongs to the Bishop. The spaces were gradually merged beginning in the 13th century, and now are separated only by arches, but each has its own altar. This arrangement was not unique in Provence; it is also found in Aix Cathedral and Apt Cathedral.

The church of St. Étienne (Saint Stephen), the parish church of the city, was probably begun in the 11th century and enlarged in the 12th century. It consisted of a long nave under a barrel vault ceiling, divided on the north side into four parts by lateral arcades resting on massive rectangular pillars. The south wall, which divided the church from the adjoining cathedral of Notre Dame, was reconstructed in the 12th century and replaced with arcades. The marks of the stonemasons can still be seen on the vault of the third traverse. Many of the stones appear to have been taken from earlier buildings, either Roman or later.

The choir of St. Etienne, the portion reserved for the clergy where the altar is located, was rebuilt as a polygon with murals in 1337, and enlarged with a lateral chapel between 1340 and 1343. It was given its present form in the 16th century. The tombs of the bishops were traditionally placed there in the 14th and 15th centuries. Two sarcophagi are still in place, that of Bishop Guillaume de Rouffilhac (bishop from 1361 to 1364) and Louis de Bouillac (1385-1405. The sarcophagus of Bishop de Bouillac dates to the Roman Empire, with a sculpture of a griffon at one end. The sarcophagus was opened and was found to contain, along with his remains, his rings and an enamelled cross dated to 1280.

The nave and choir of the cathedral of Notre Dame, the bishop's portion of the church, were built next, in the 13th century, against the south wall of the church of St. Étienne. The first part constructed was the porch and bell tower, at the western end of the nave, between the baptistery and the nave. This part of the church, like the residence of the bishop at the other end, had a strongly military appearance, as if to stress the power of the bishop in temporal as well as spiritual affairs.

== Cloister ==
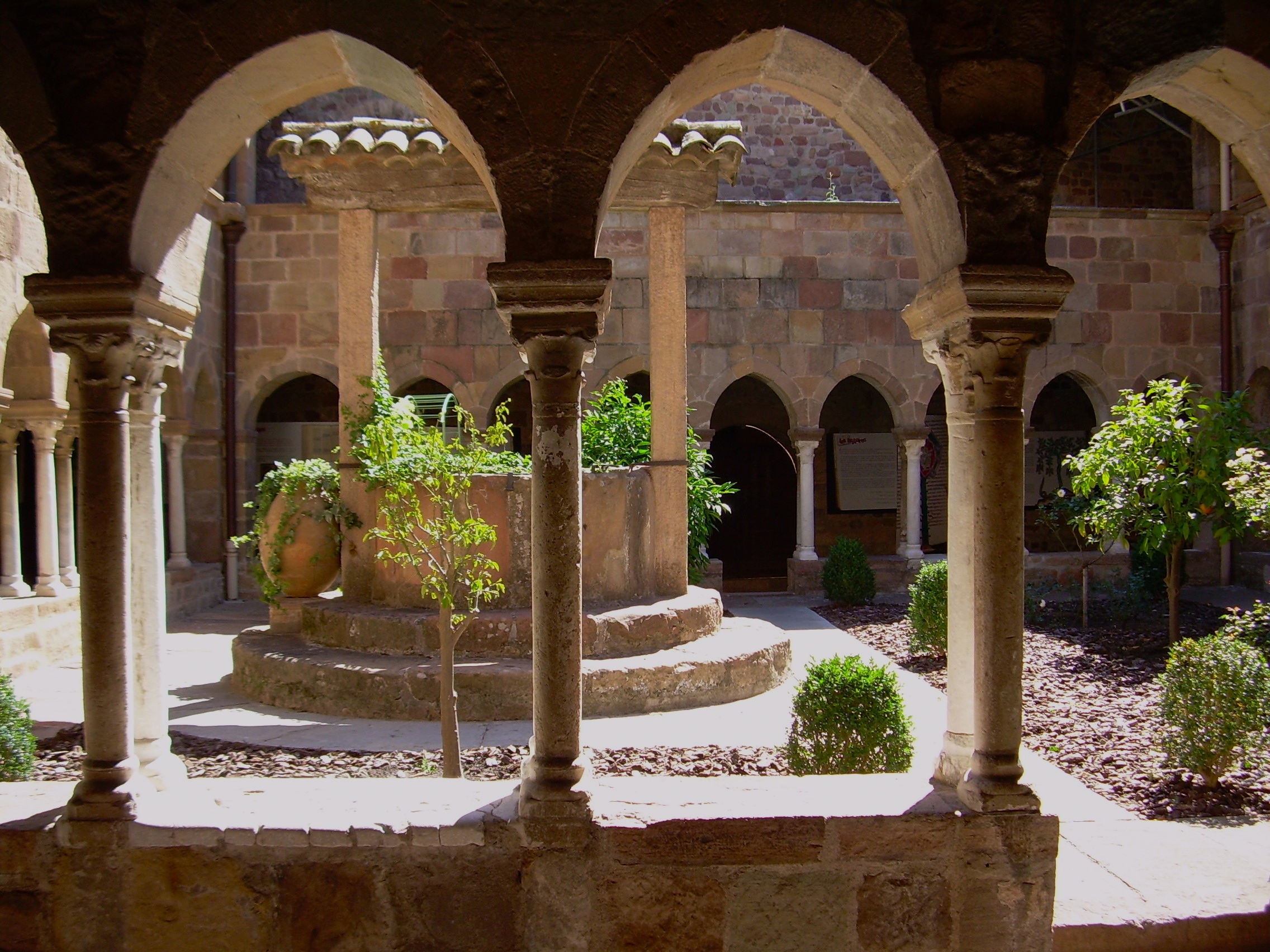
Columns of the cloister

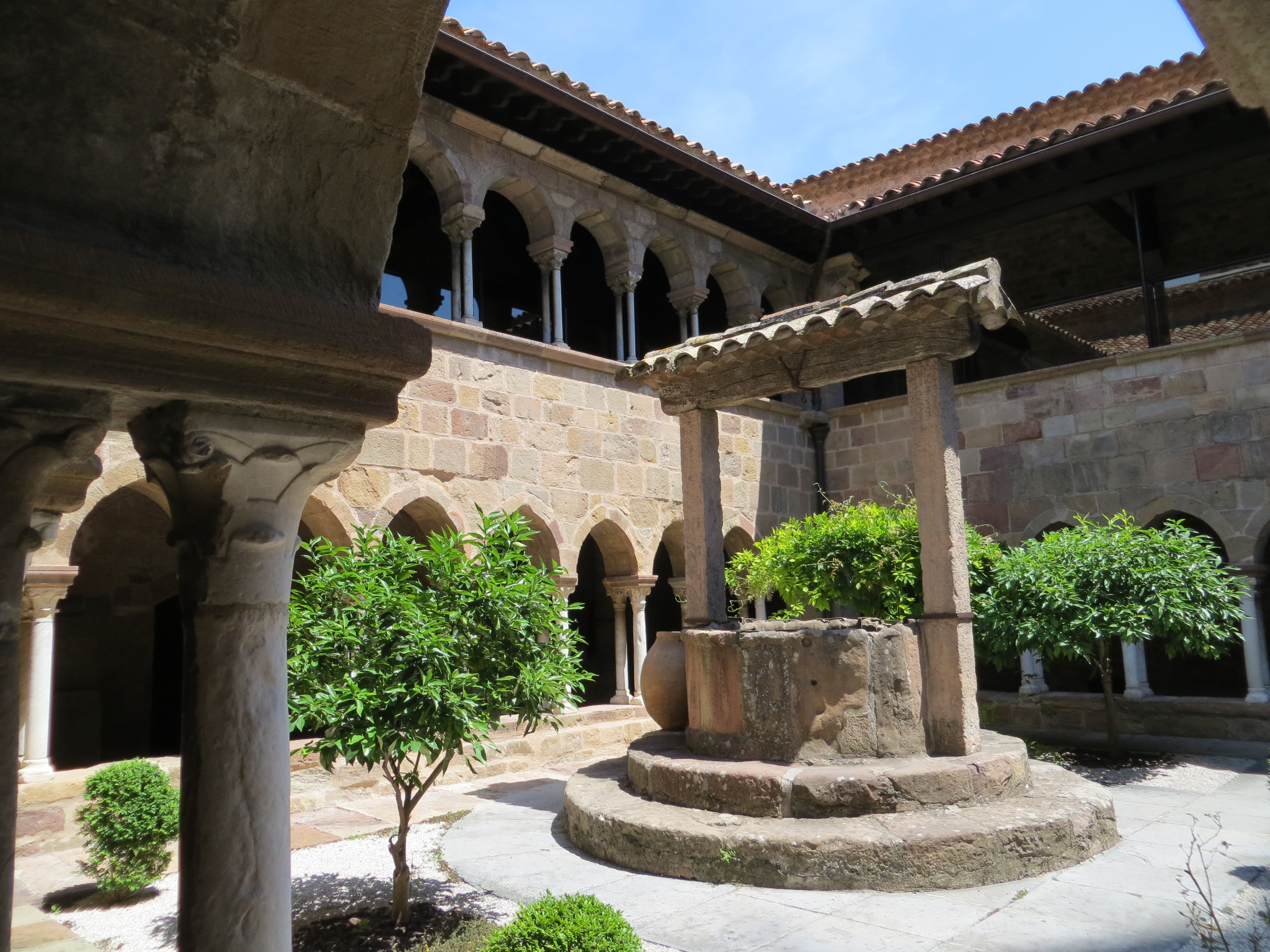
The cloister (13th c.)

The cloister, which served as a place of meditation for the bishop and the dozen canons who served him, was built in the 13th century on the north side of the cathedral. It consists of pointed arches resting on double Corinthian columns. The decoration of the capitals of the columns features the key, the symbol of the bishops of Fréjus, and the fleur-de-lis, the symbol of Charles I of Anjou, the brother of Louis IX of France, (Saint Louis), who had become the Count of Provence in 1246.

== Bell tower ==
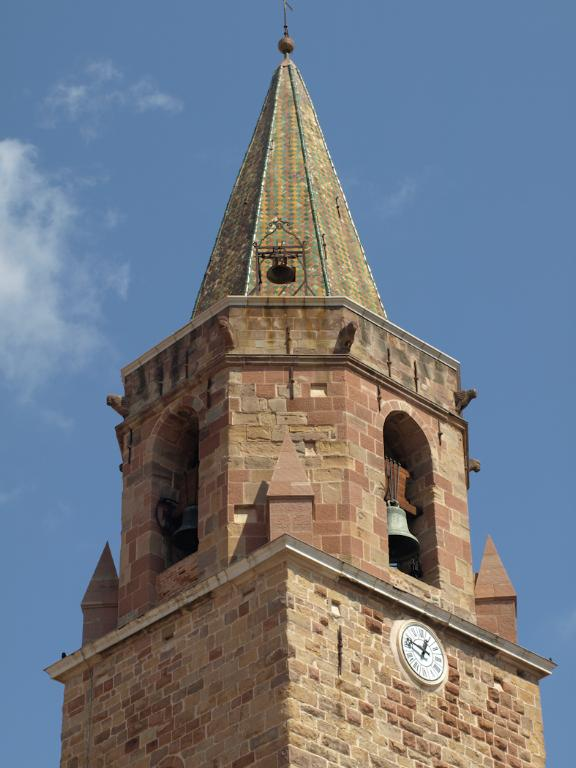
The bell tower

An earlier bell tower existed in the 12th century at the entrance of the first traverse of the Notre-Dame nave. The current upper portion of the bell tower, with a spire, was added in the 18th century. The spire decorated with yellow and gold paint to give the illusion of gilding. Beneath the spire is an octagonal base from the 16th century. This rests upon a square base, which is even older, from the 13th century, located above the narthex on the side of the south disambulatory.

The tower currently houses four bells. The oldest was given by the future pope John XXII, in 1303, and is named, like the cathedral, for Leontius of Fréjus. It was melted down and recast in 1770. The second bell was made in 1445, and is hung in a small campanile attached to the bell tower, This bell is dedicated by an inscription to the Virgin Mary, and is decorated with images of the Virgin and Child and Saint Léonce. Another bell was cast in 1766

== Art and decoration ==
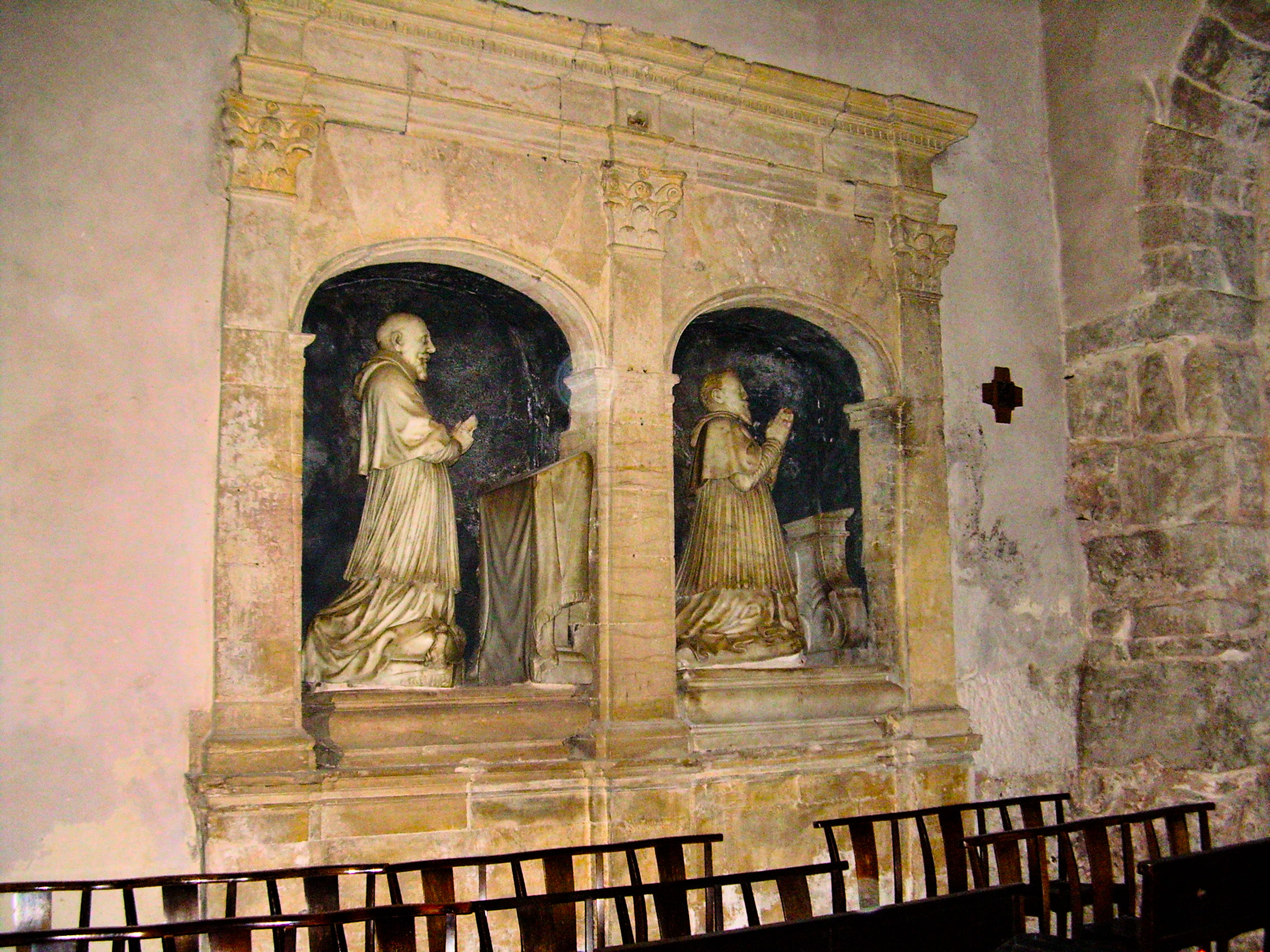
Tomb sculptures of Bishops Barthelemi de Camelin (1599–1637) and his nephew Bishop Pierre de Camelin (1637–1654).

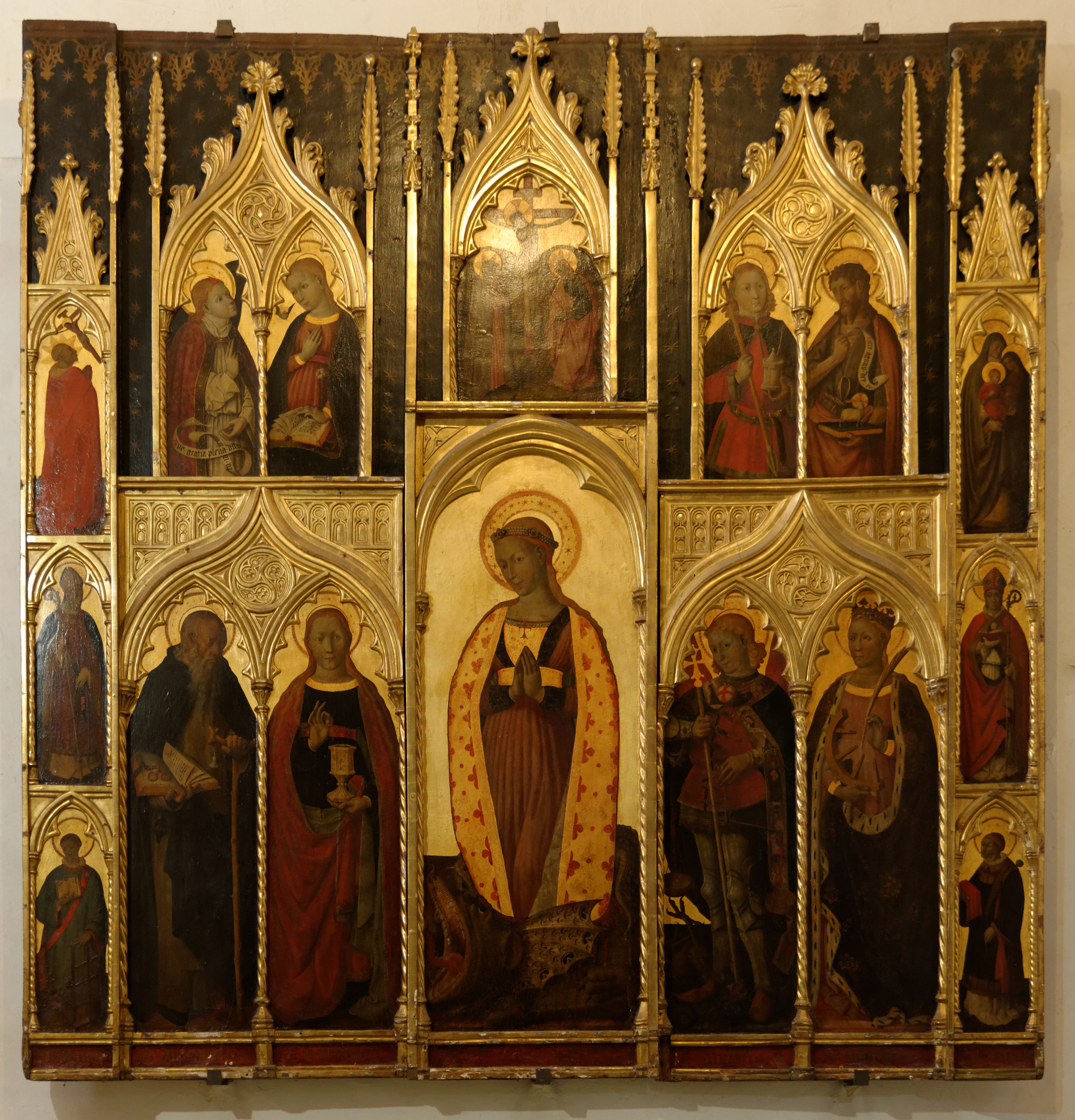
The retable of Saint Marguerite, by Jacopo Durandi (15th century)

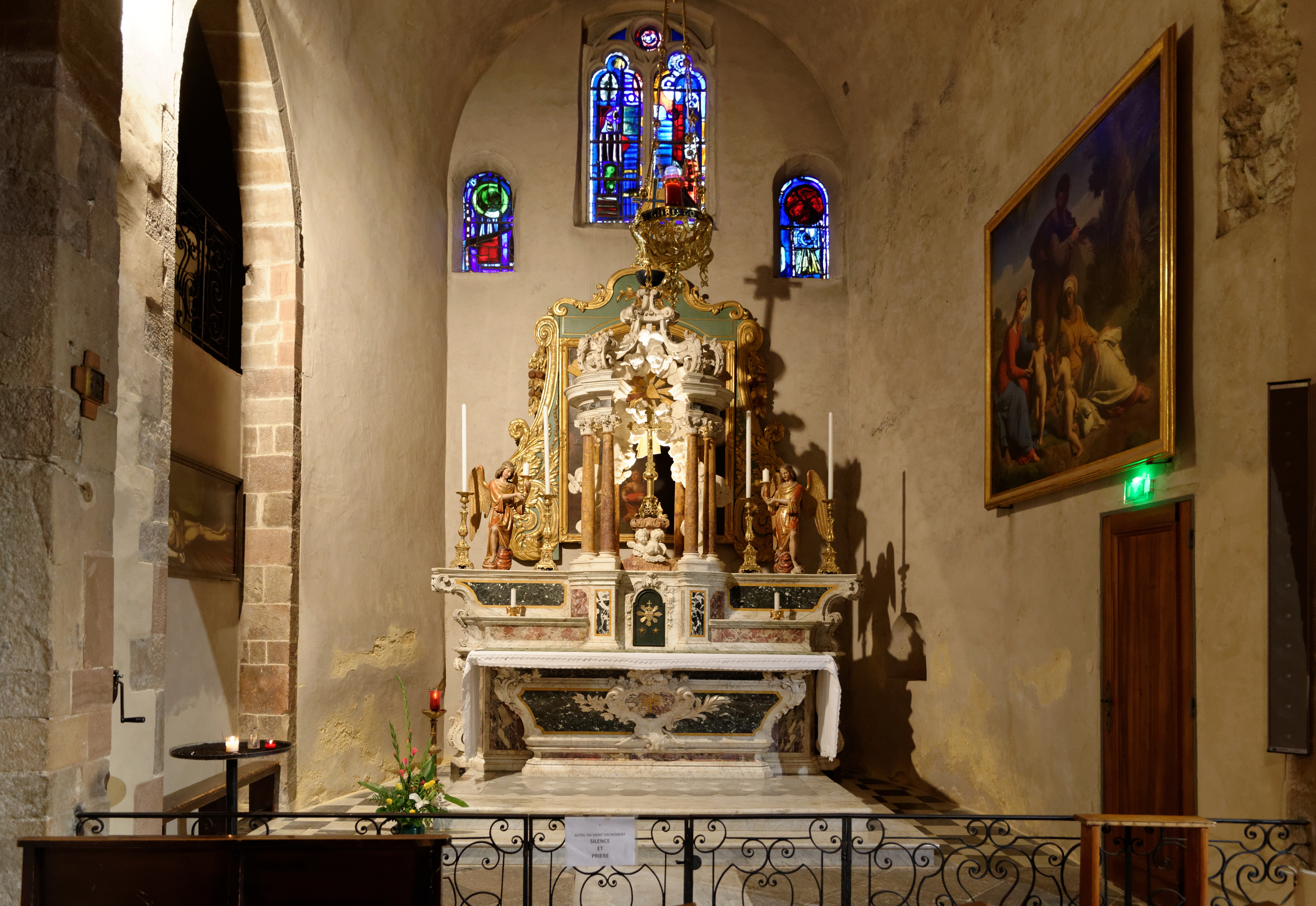
Main altar made for the Choir of Notre-Dame, now in the Choir of Saint Stephen.

The art and decoration of the cathedral includes a retable named for Saint Margaret the Virgin, in the second of the lateral chapels on the north side of the nave of Saint Stephen. It was painted in tempera on a wood panel by Jacopo Durandi in the 15th century. The central figure is Saint Margaret stepping out of the jaws of a dragon that had swallowed her. She was the saint addressed by young women who were giving birth. To her right is Saint Anthony of Antioch and Saint Mary Magdalen, holding a vase of perfume. To her left Saint Michael has slain the dragon, and Saint Catherine of Alexandria is holding a piece of the wheel on which she had been unsuccessfully tortured.

On the west wall of the nave of Saint Stephen, placed in niches framed by pilasters, are two funeral monuments to bishops of the cathedral, Barthelemi de Camelin (1599–1637) and his nephew Pierre de Camelin (1637–1654).

The main altar in the choir of Saint Stephen was made in 1778 of polychrome marble by the Marseille sculptor Dominique Fossaty. It was characteristic of the new style of the 18th century, to have the altar in the center of the choir, rather than against a wall. It was originally in the choir of Notre-Dame, where it had replaced an enormous work of sculpted gypsum made in 1551, of which only a few fragments remain.

The carved choir stalls in the Notre-Dame choir are made of walnut, and to date to 1441. They were made by the Toulon craftsman Jean Flamenc. Originally in the third traverse of the Notre-Dame nave, they were moved to their present position at the end of the apse when the church was remodelled in 1778.

=== Cloister paintings ===
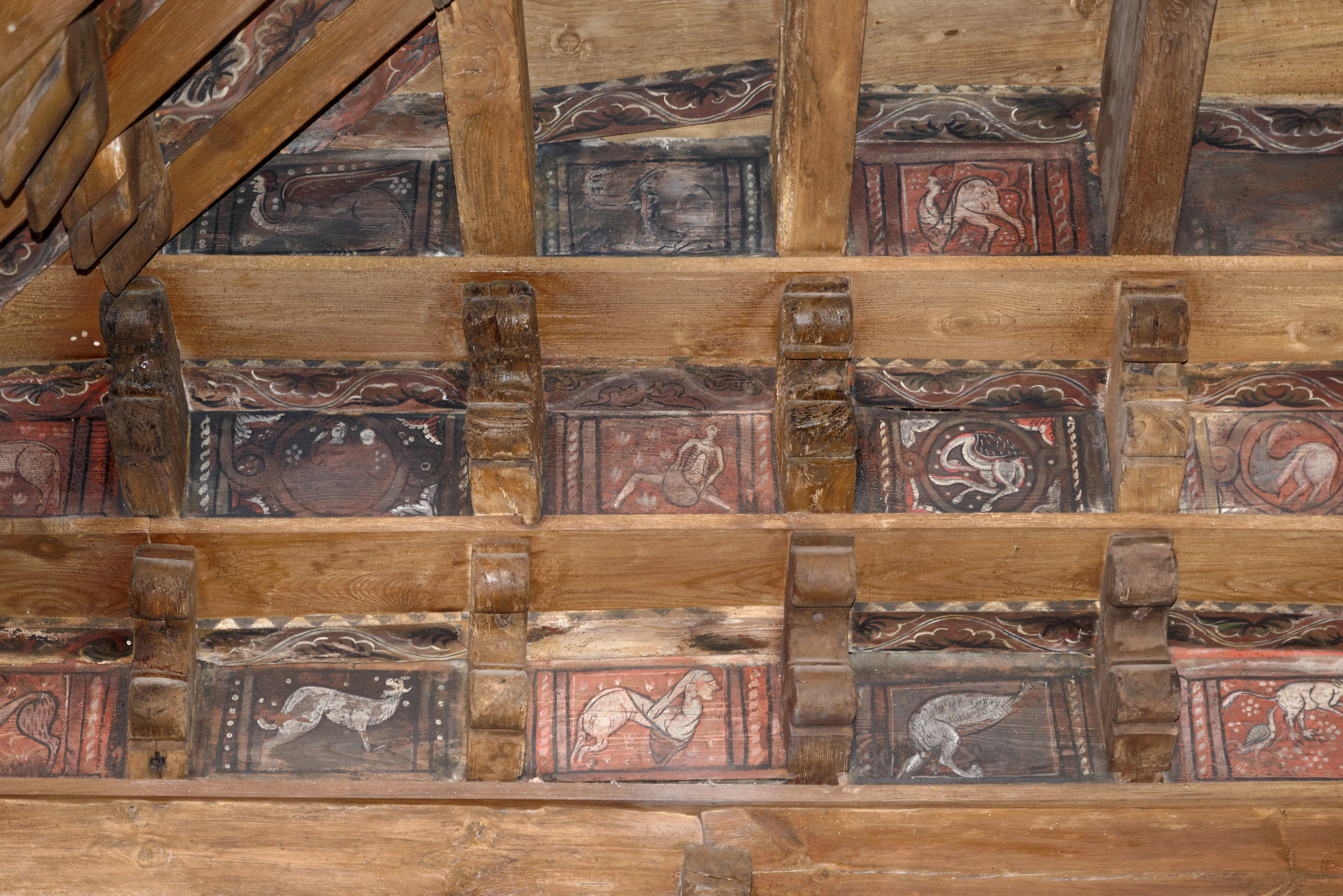
Carved and painted wood ceiling of the cloister

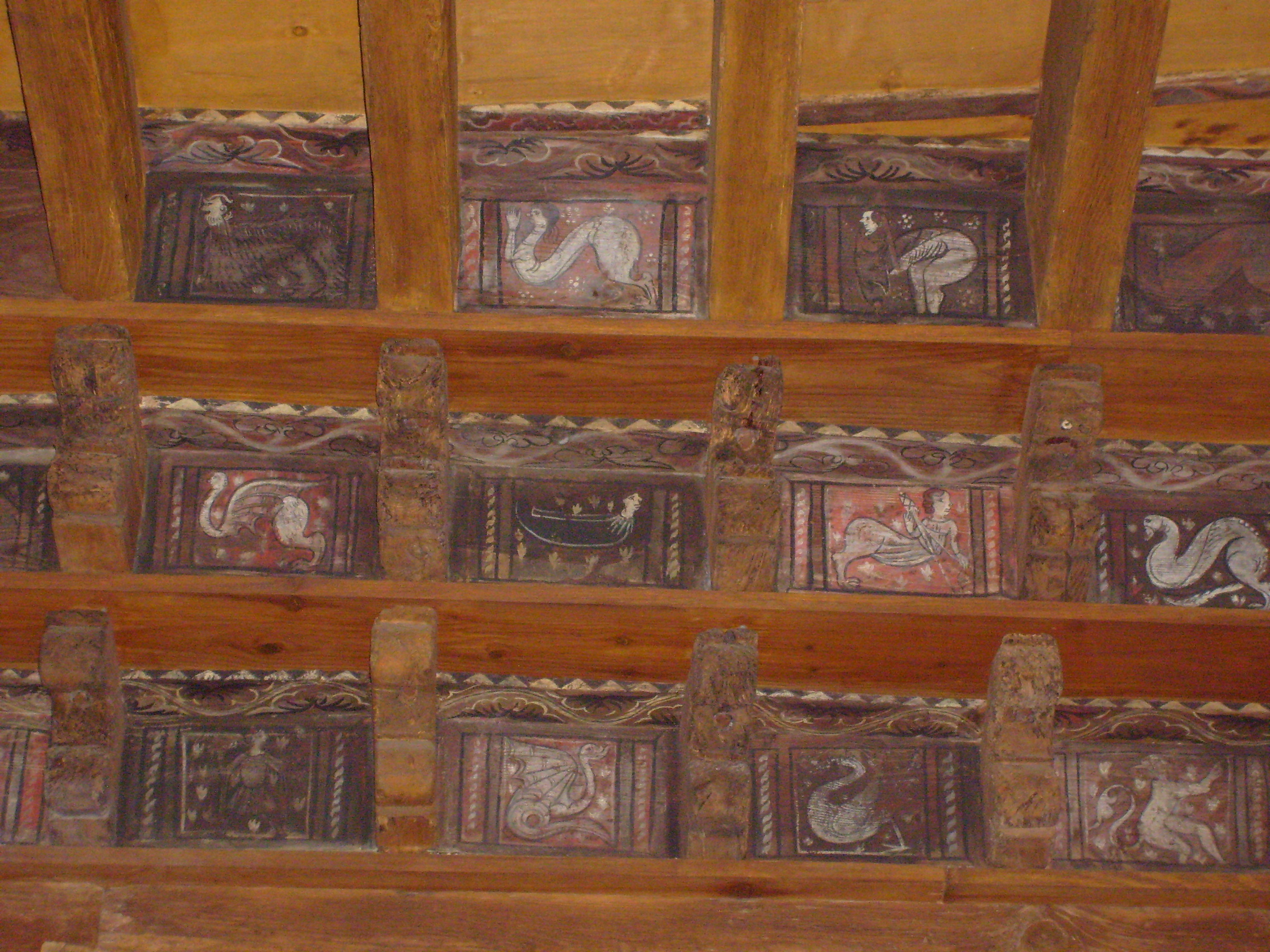
The cloister ceiling is decorated with paintings of 14th-century animals, people and mythical creatures (click image to enlarge)

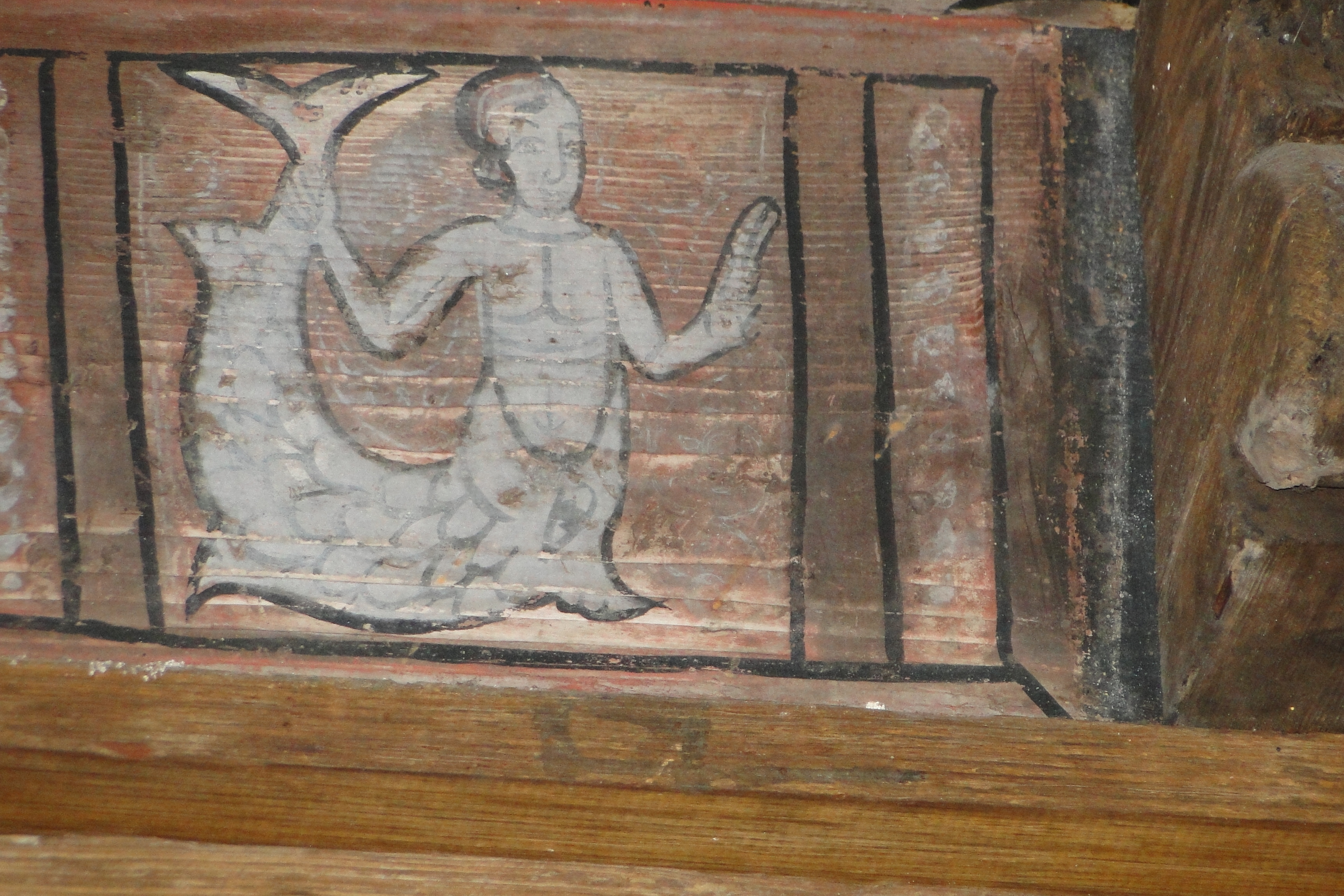
A mermaid painted on the cloister roof (14th c.)

An upper level was added to the cloister between 1350 and 1360, reached by a monumental stairway. The builders added a wooden ceiling to the lower level and decorated the brightly painted panels with biblical scenes, fantastic animals, and scenes of daily life. Only half of the paintings remain today, and the bright colours have been faded by oxidation, but they provide a remarkable look at medieval life and the medieval imagination.

The panels include paintings of the Virgin Mary and the Infant Christ; Saint Peter; several canons (recognizable by their fur hats); several priests praying or preaching; a demon with the tail of a serpent; angels playing instruments; a fallen angel with the wings of a bat; a centaur; a mermaid; a dragon; an elephant; a tiger; an ostrich; domestic animals, such as horses, dogs and pigs; and common wild animals, such as wolves and deer. People from ordinary medieval life are also portrayed: a butcher, a knight, a juggler, a young woman performing her toilet, and both a man and woman answering the call of nature. All together the panels portray the history of the world and ordinary life as known and imagined in the Middle Ages.

== The organ ==
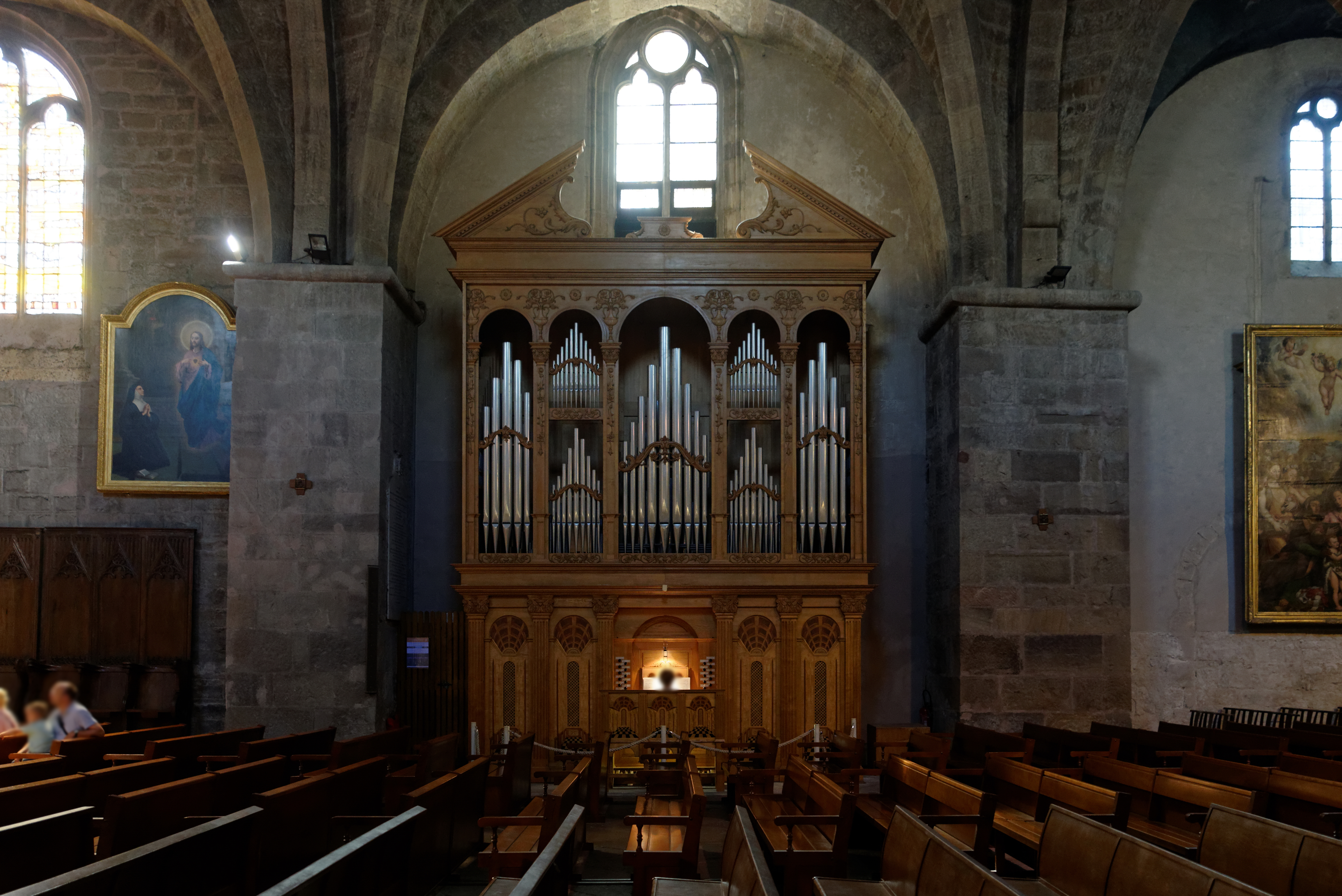
The organ

The first known organ was put into place in 1600 and was repaired in 1778 and 1806. It was enlarged and replaced by a new organ in 1810. In 1857 a new organ from the firm of Cavaillé-Coll was installed and was restored in 1926. However, in 1944, in the course of World War II, the cathedral complex was damaged by bombing. The organ was exposed to dust and to the wind. The organ moved to another building, where it was largely forgotten, and many pieces disappeared. Construction of a new organ did not begin until 1962, and this organ was installed in 1967. However, this organ deteriorated quickly. In 1986 the French government commissioned the construction of a new organ by the firm of Pascal Quorin. It was installed in 1991.

== Bishop's Palace and the cathedral complex ==
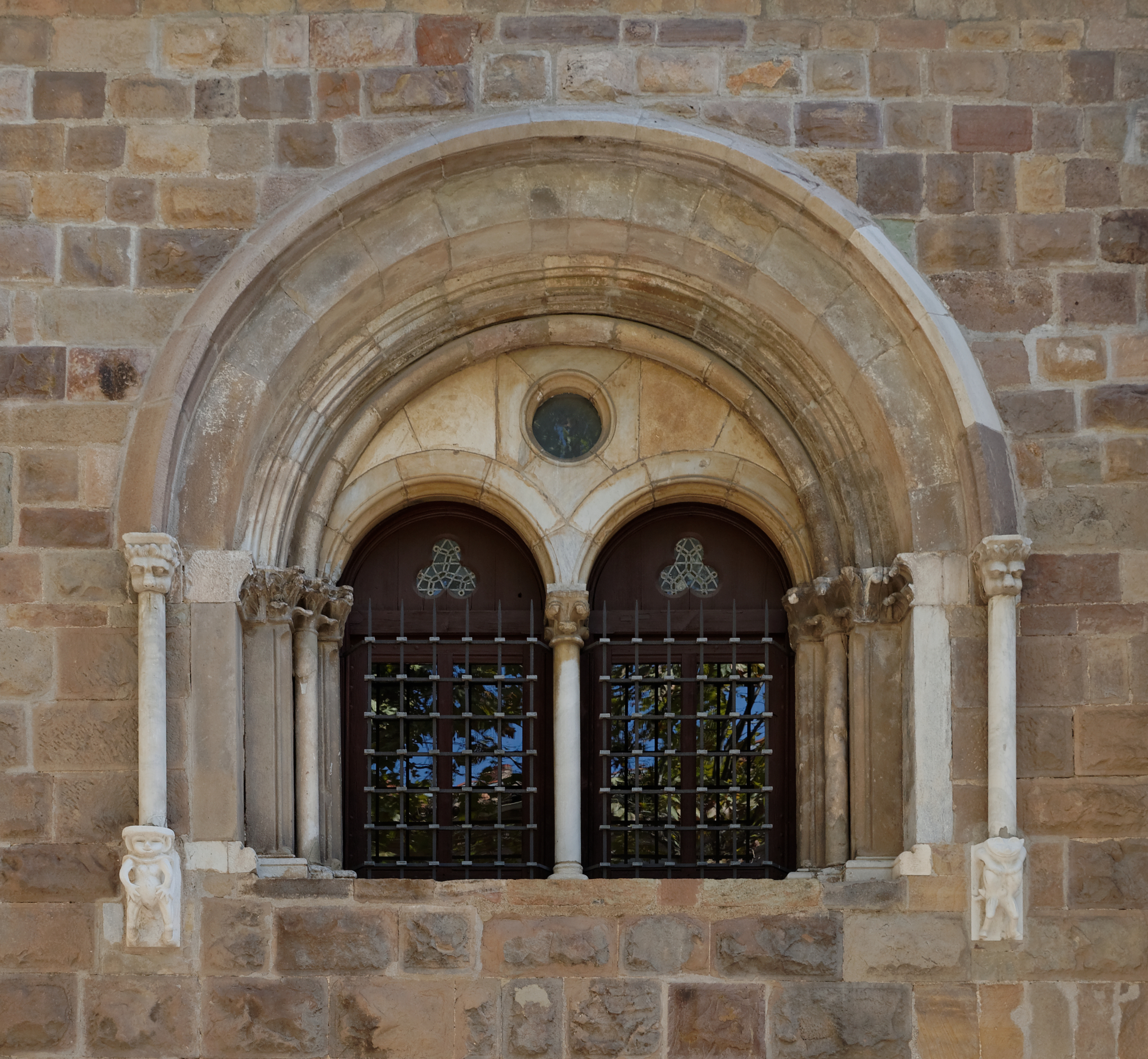
Windows of the west building

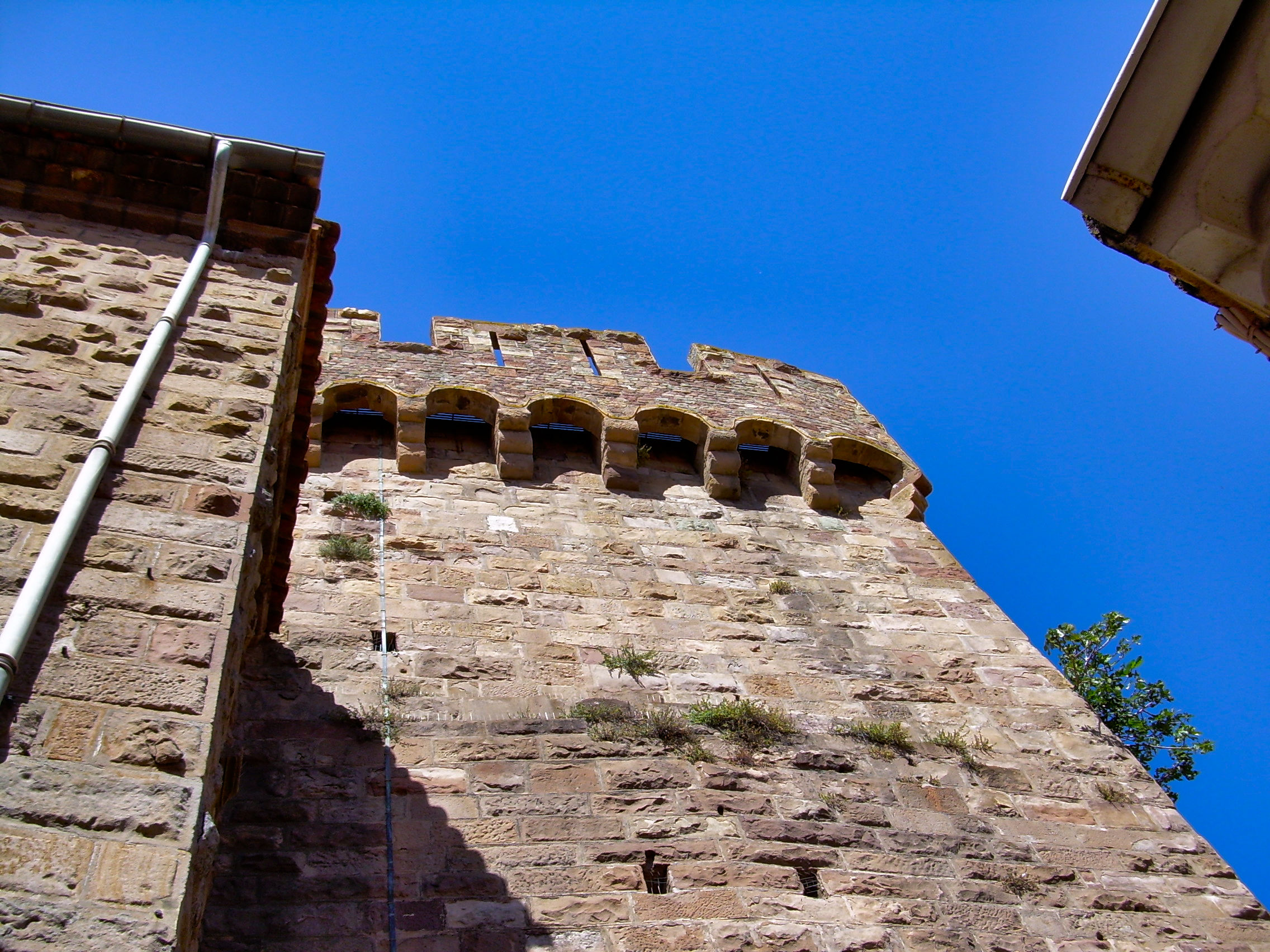
Crenelated walls of the old Bishop's palace

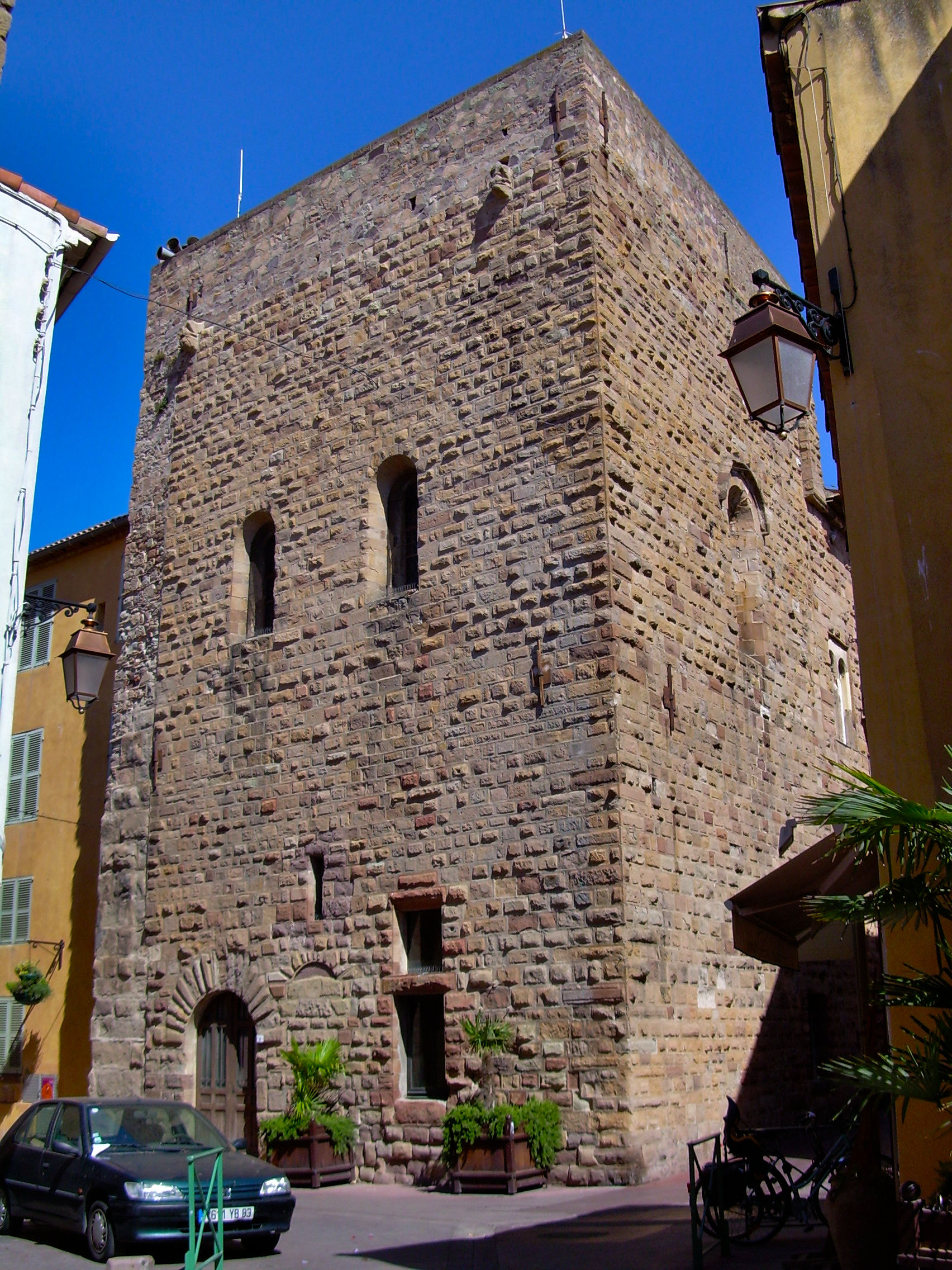
Remains of the old Bishop's Palace today, incorporated into the Hôtel de Ville, or city hall

A residence for the bishop apparently existed in the 5th century, just south of the cathedral. A more imposing palace for the bishop was built in the 11th and 12th centuries, which housed the bishop, the dozen canons and a dozen beneficiers. In the 13th century, a separate building was built for the canons. The palace of the bishop was relatively small – 6.5 metres by 5 metres, and three storeys high, with a vaulted hall on the second floor and a terrace on the roof with a crenelated wall for defence. The building served as both a palace and a fortification, and was probably part of the massive wall of the city, three metres thick at its base.

For many centuries the bishops were from local aristocratic families, but in the 13th century they were appointees sent from the Papal Court at Avignon. The first of these bishops, Jacques Dueze, later became Pope John XXII, from 1316 to 1344. These new incumbents, with more income and more cosmopolitan tastes, transformed the residence from a fortress to a palace, greatly enlarging the space, building large halls and chapels. These works continued from the 15th to the 17th century, largely destroying the medieval residence, and replacing it with a palace in Renaissance style .

In the 18th century, as the city went into economic decline, the bishops of Fréjus began to neglect their residence, spending more and more time in Draguignan, the new seat of the bishopric. After the French Revolution the palace was abandoned for twenty years. In 1823 the new bishop decided to replace the structure completely. Most of the palace was demolished, and part of what remained became part of the Hôtel de Ville (town hall) in 1912.

== Sources ==
- Bastié, Aldo (2000). Les chemins de la Provence romane (in French). Rennes: Ouest-France. ISBN 2-7373-1430-5.
- Denizeau, Gérard (2003). Histoire Visuelle des Monuments de France (in French). Paris: Larousse. ISBN 2035052017.
- Fixot, Michel; Sauze, Elisabeth (2004). Fréjus : la cathédrale Saint-Léonce et le groupe épiscopal (in French). Paris: Monum, Éditions du Patrimoine. ISBN 2858227241.
- France Mediéval. Monum, Éditions du patrimoine/Guides Gallimard, 2004.
