= Jardin des Serres d'Auteuil =

Garden in Paris, France

Coordinates: 48°50′49″N 2°15′8″E

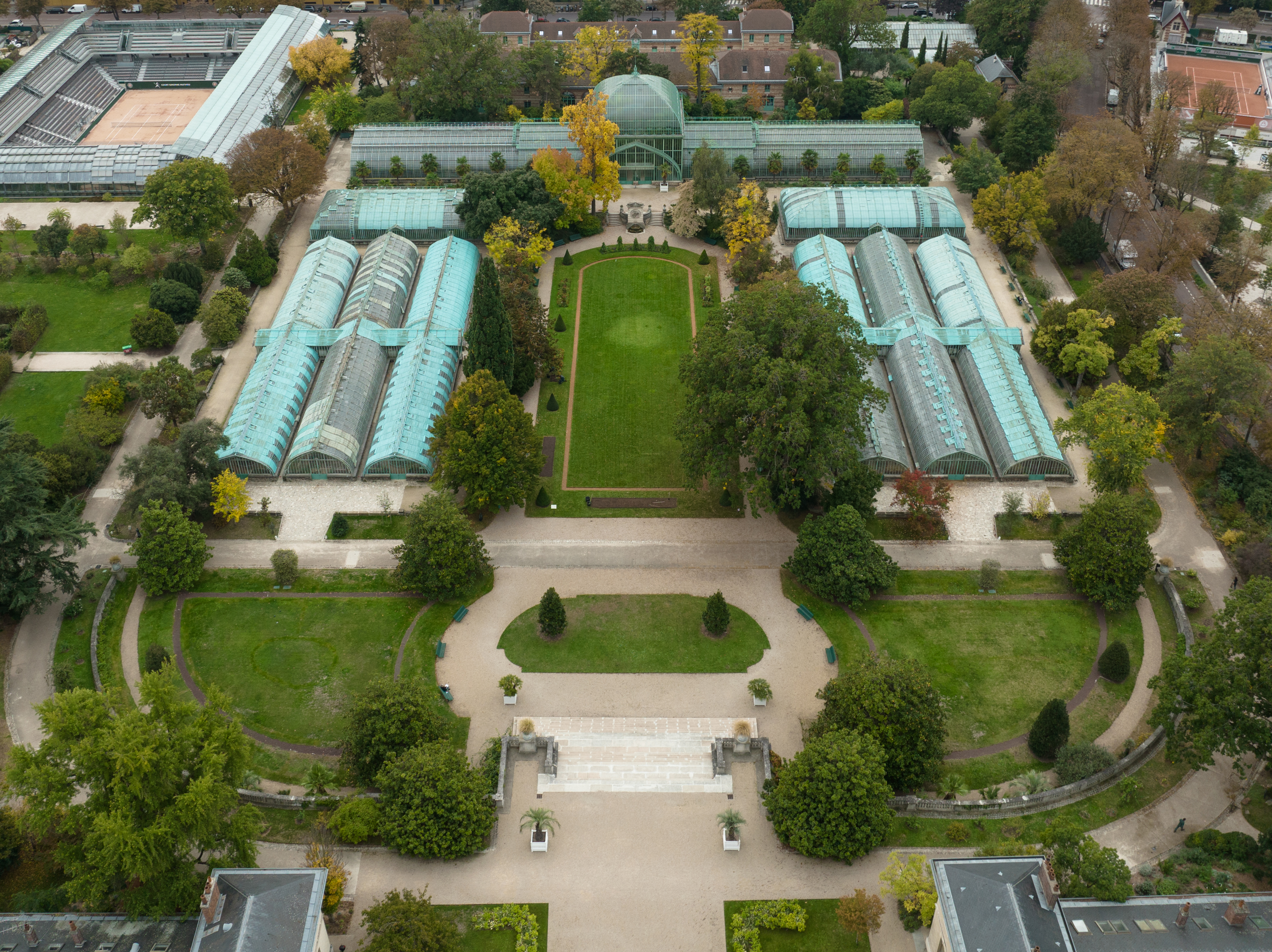
Jardin des Serres d'Auteuil

The Jardin des Serres d'Auteuil (French pronunciation: [ʒaʁdɛ̃ de sɛʁ dotœj], literally 'Garden of the Greenhouses of Auteuil') is a botanical garden set within a major greenhouse complex located at the southern edge of the Bois de Boulogne in the 16th arrondissement, with entry at 1 avenue Gordon-Bennett, Paris, France.

== Botanical garden ==
The site first served as a botanical garden in 1761 under Louis XV. Today's greenhouses were designed and constructed in 1895-1898 by architect Jean-Camille Formigé (1845-1926). In 1998 they became part of the Jardin botanique de la Ville de Paris. Today the greenhouses produce about 100,000 plants per year for the interior decoration of municipal buildings. Exhibition greenhouses contain palm trees, succulents, and tropical collections, with substantial representation of Araceae, Begoniaceae, Bromeliaceae, Codiaeum, Peperomia, Philodendron, Rhipsalis, Rhododendron, Streptocarpus sect. Saintpaulia, and Zingiberaceae.

Jardin des serres d'Auteuil, Paris

== See also ==
- List of botanical gardens in France
