= Jean-Camille Formigé =

French architect

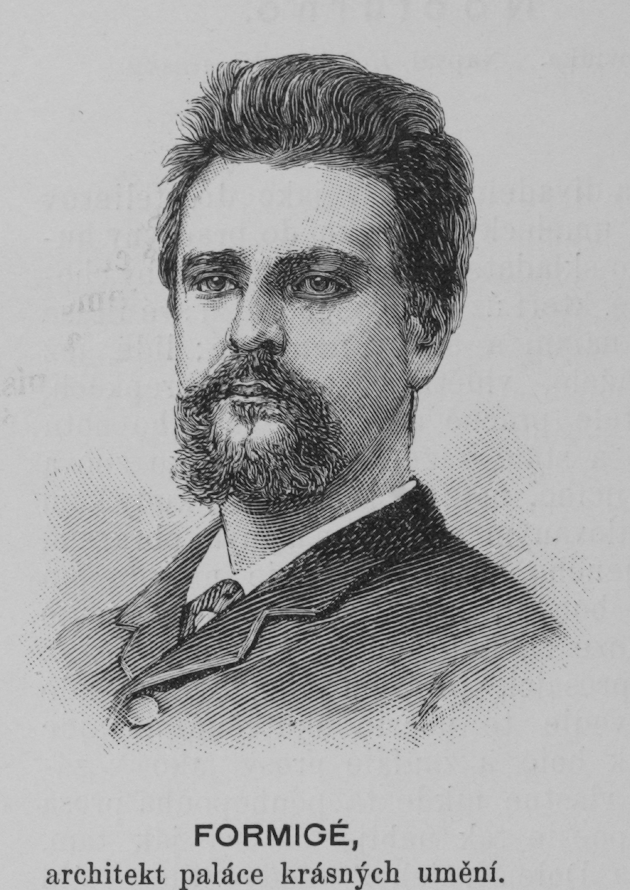
Jean Camille Formigé (1889)

Jean-Camille Formigé (French pronunciation: [ʒɑ̃ kamij fɔʁmiʒe]; 1845-1926) was a French architect during the French Third Republic. He served as the chief architect of historic monuments of France, and also as the chief architect of buildings, promenades and gardens of the city of Paris. His son, Jules Formigé, was also a prominent architect.

Notable buildings, structures and parks designed by Formigé include the Pont de Bir-Hakeim (1905); the Viaduc d'Austerlitz (1904); the dramatic sloping park in front of the Basilica of Sacre-Coeur in Paris; the Square d'Anvers, the Square des Epinettes and the square in front of the Arenes de Lutece in Paris; the monumental greenhouse of the Jardin des Serres d'Auteuil (1895-1898); the Columbarium at Pere-Lachaise cemetery in Paris; the restoration of the Roman amphitheater and theater in Arles, France; and the restoration of the Roman theater at Orange, France. He restored the Abbey of Conques (1878) and the Tower of Saint-Jacques, across from the Louvre, in Paris. He also designed the Palace of Fine Arts and the Palace of Liberal Arts, two of the major exhibition halls at the Paris Universal Exposition of 1889.

== Career ==
Jean-Camille Formigé was born in 1845 in Le Bouscat, in the Gironde department of France. He studied architecture during the Second Empire at the Imperial School of Fine Arts in Paris, in the atelier Laisne, and received a post with the Commission of Historic Monuments in 1871. He became a member of the Commission in 1887, a position he held until 1892, when he became Chief Architect of Historic Monuments. He also became chief architect of the Service of buildings, promenades and gardens of the city of Paris, and architect-in-chief of the city of Arles.

He received gold medals for his architectural projects at the Paris Salon of 1875 and 1876, and at the Paris Universal Exposition of 1878. He was elected to the Academy of Fine Arts in 1920. A street is named for him in the 15th arrondissement of Paris, and another in the town of Orange, France. A square is named for him in the town of Frejus, France.

== Major projects of Jean-Camille Formigé ==
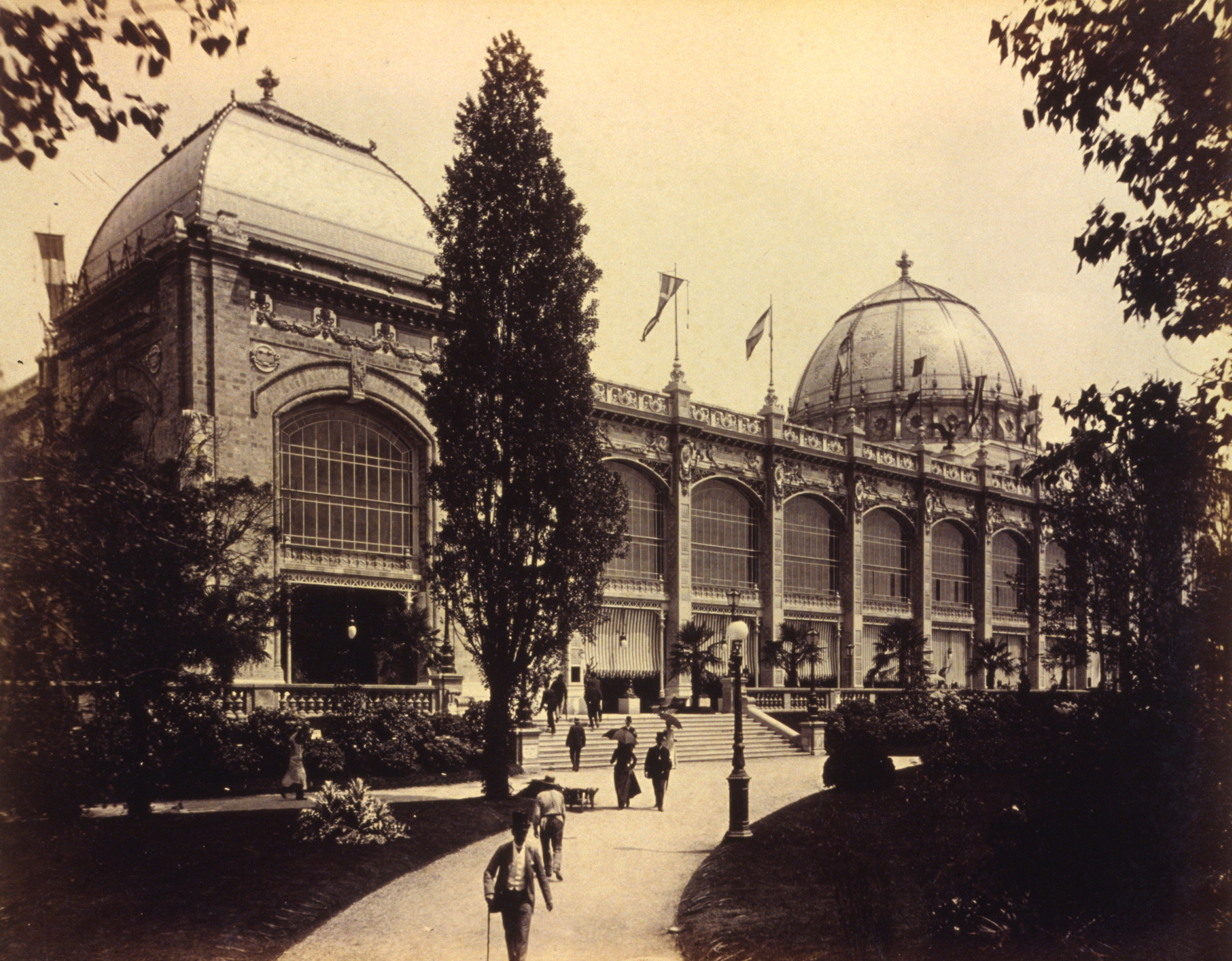
Palace of Fine Arts of the Paris Exposition of 1889

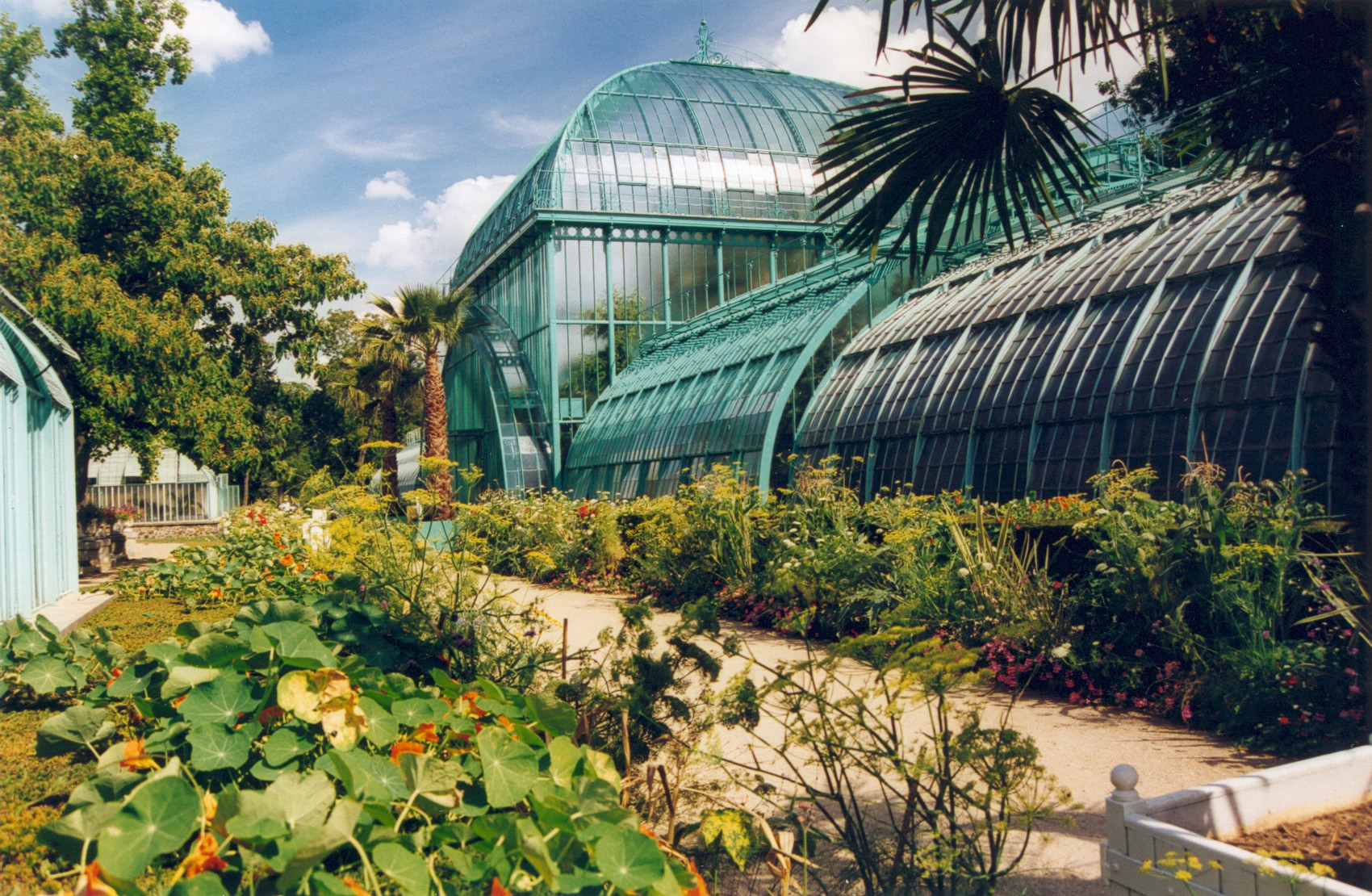
The monumental greenhouses of the Jardin des Serres d'Auteuil (1895-1898).

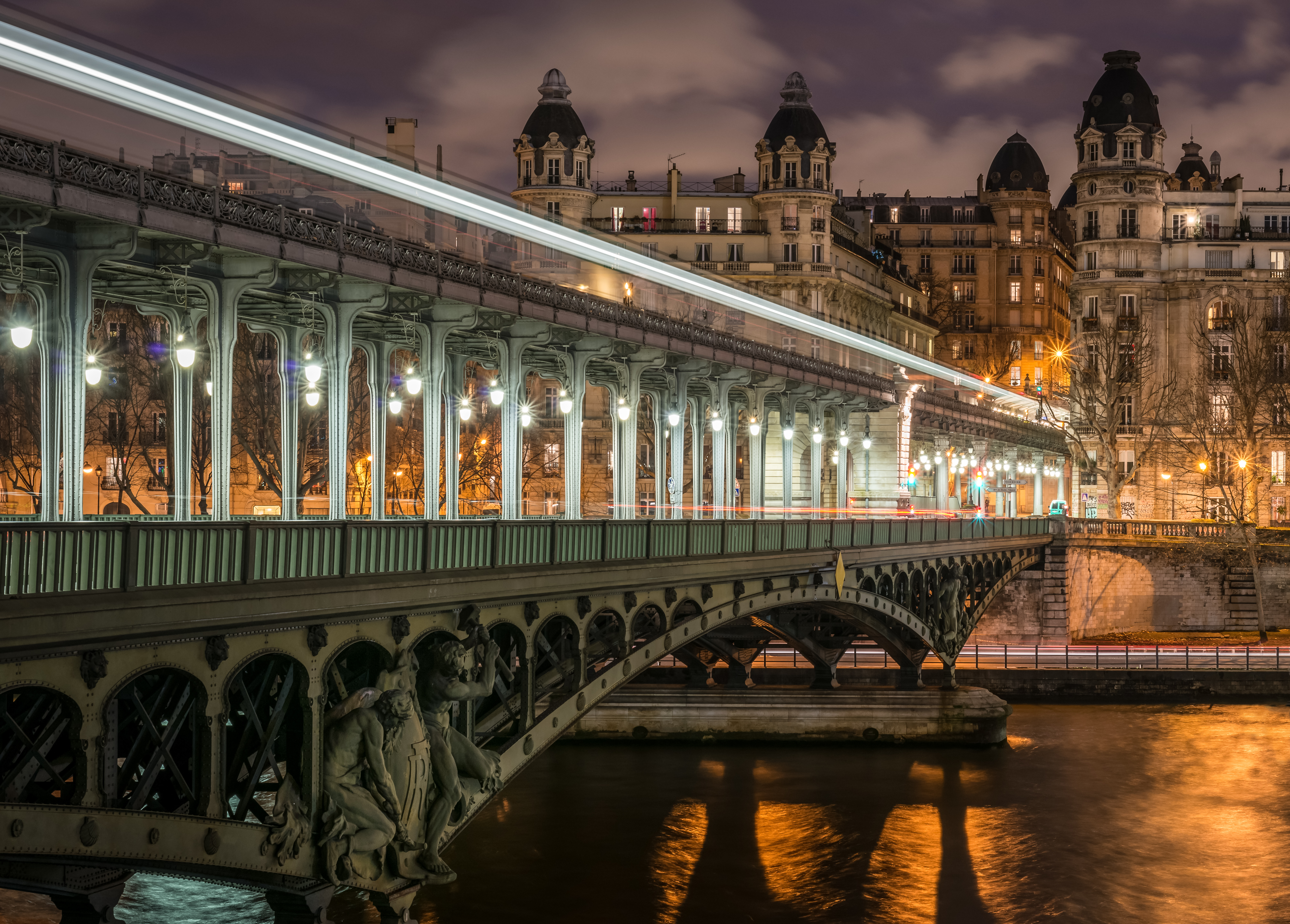
The Pont de Bir-Hakeim (1905)

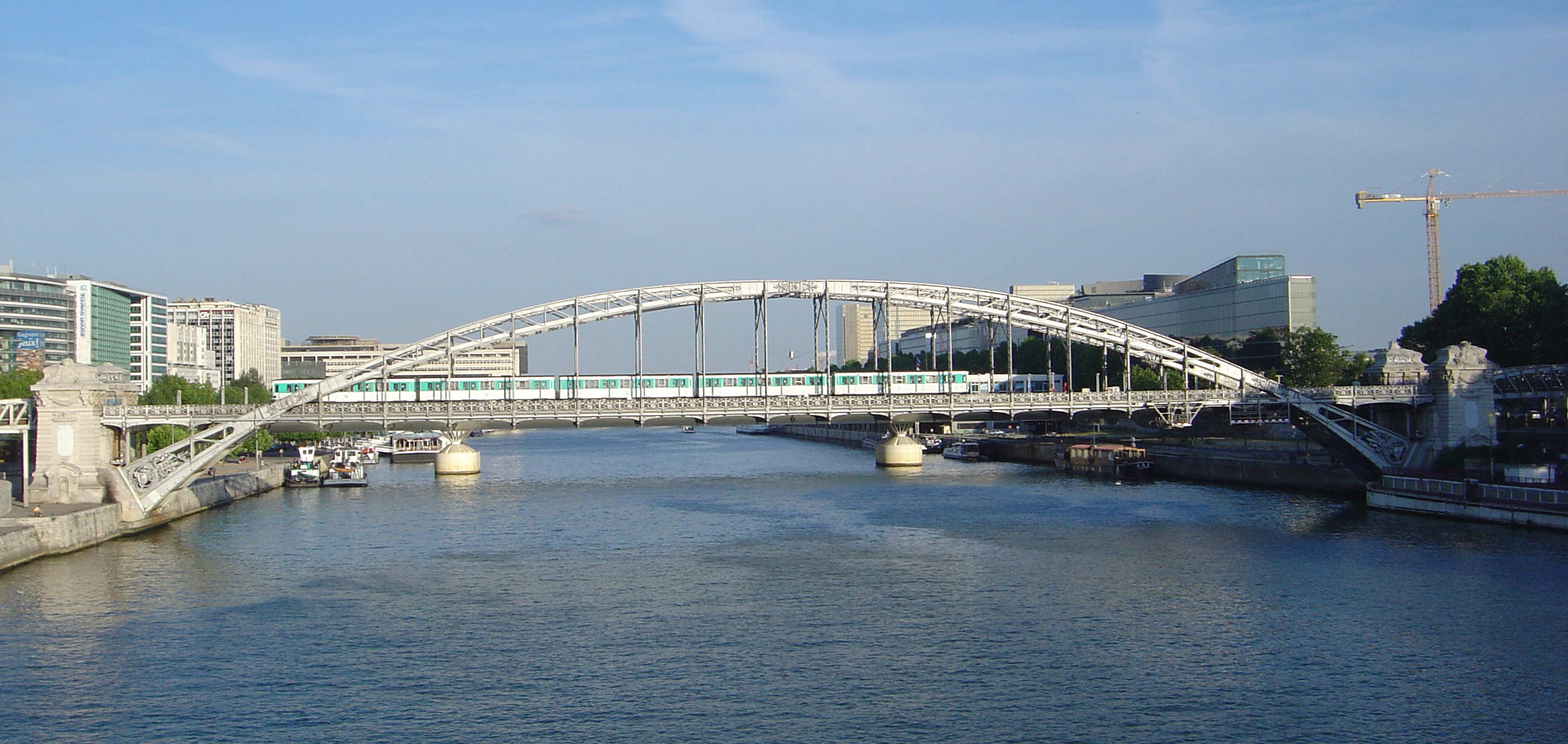
The Viaduct of Austerlitz (1904)

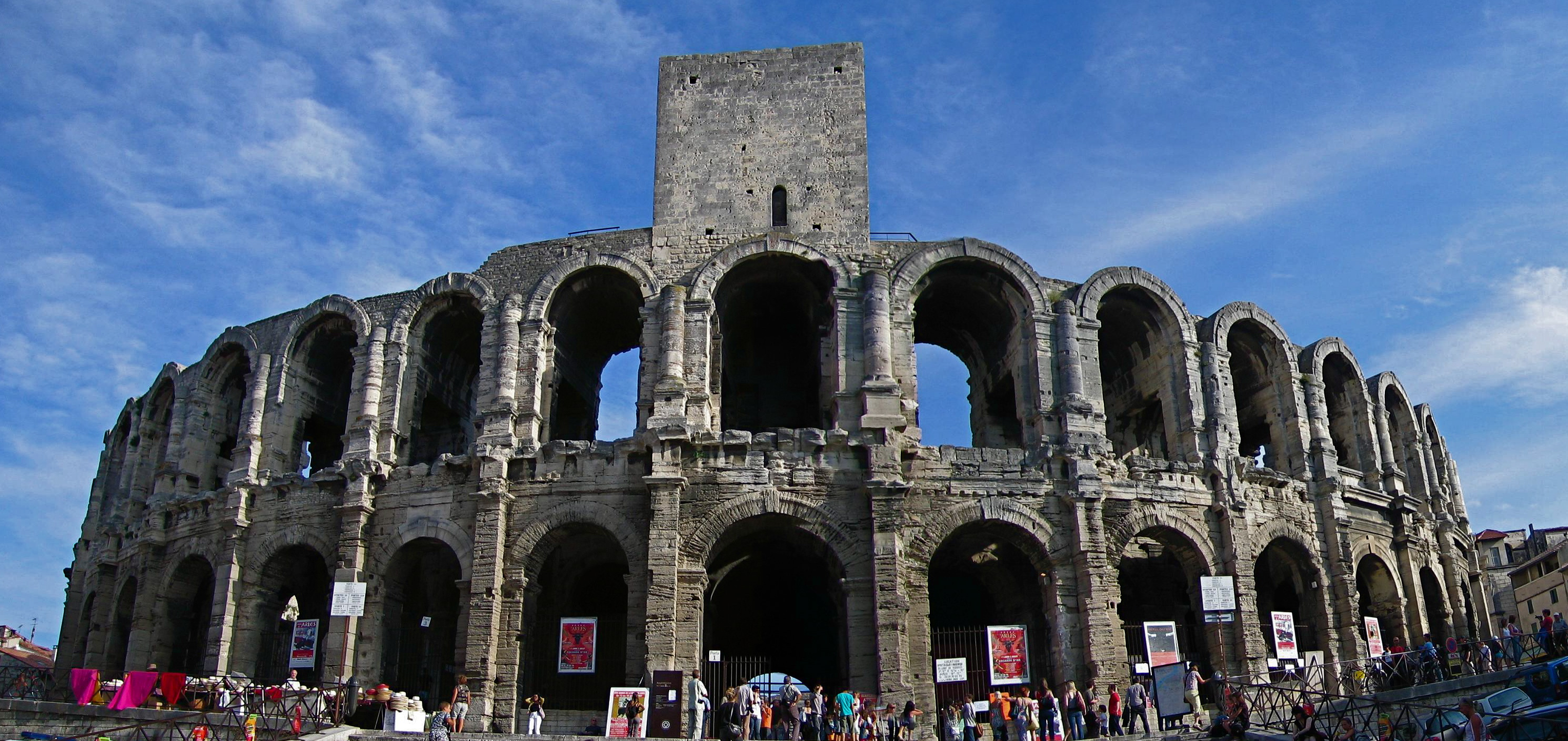
Restoration of the Roman amphitheater in Arles

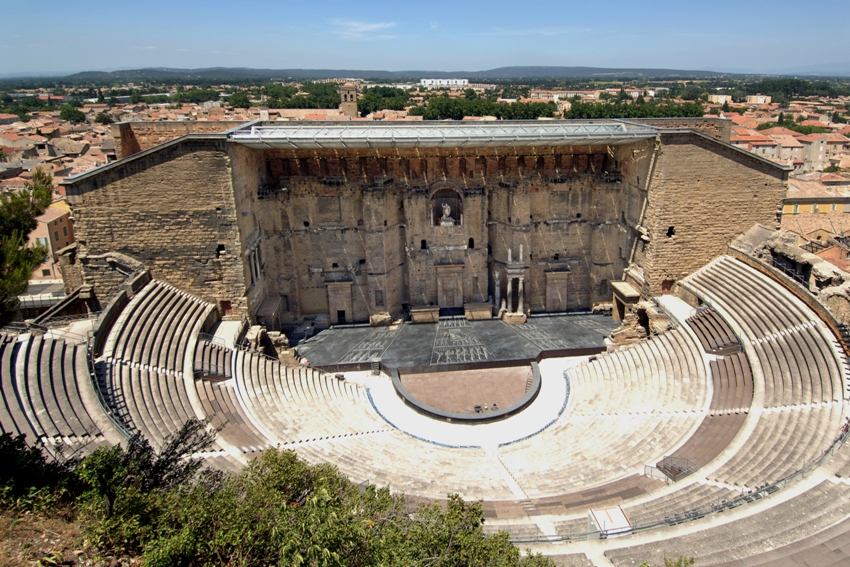
Restoration of the ancient Roman theater of Orange (1892). The work was continued by his son, Jules Formigé.

== Other projects ==
- Austerlitz Viaduct (1904)
- Passy Viaduct (1905) (Pont de Bir-Hakeim)
- Metro Line 2 Viaduct, Paris (1903)
- Serres du Jardin des Serres d'Auteuil, Paris (1895-1898)

== See also ==
- History of Parks and Gardens of Paris
- Paris architecture of the Belle Époque

== Bibliography ==
- Jarrasse, Dominique, Grammaire des jardins Parisiens, (2007), Parigramme, Paris (ISBN 978-284096-476-6)
- Plum, Gilles (2014). Paris architectures de la Belle Époque. Éditions Parigramme. ISBN 978-2-84096-800-9.
