= Jardin botanique de la Ville de Paris =

Garden in France

The Jardin botanique de la Ville de Paris (83 hectares in total) is a collection of four botanical gardens maintained by the city of Paris, France.

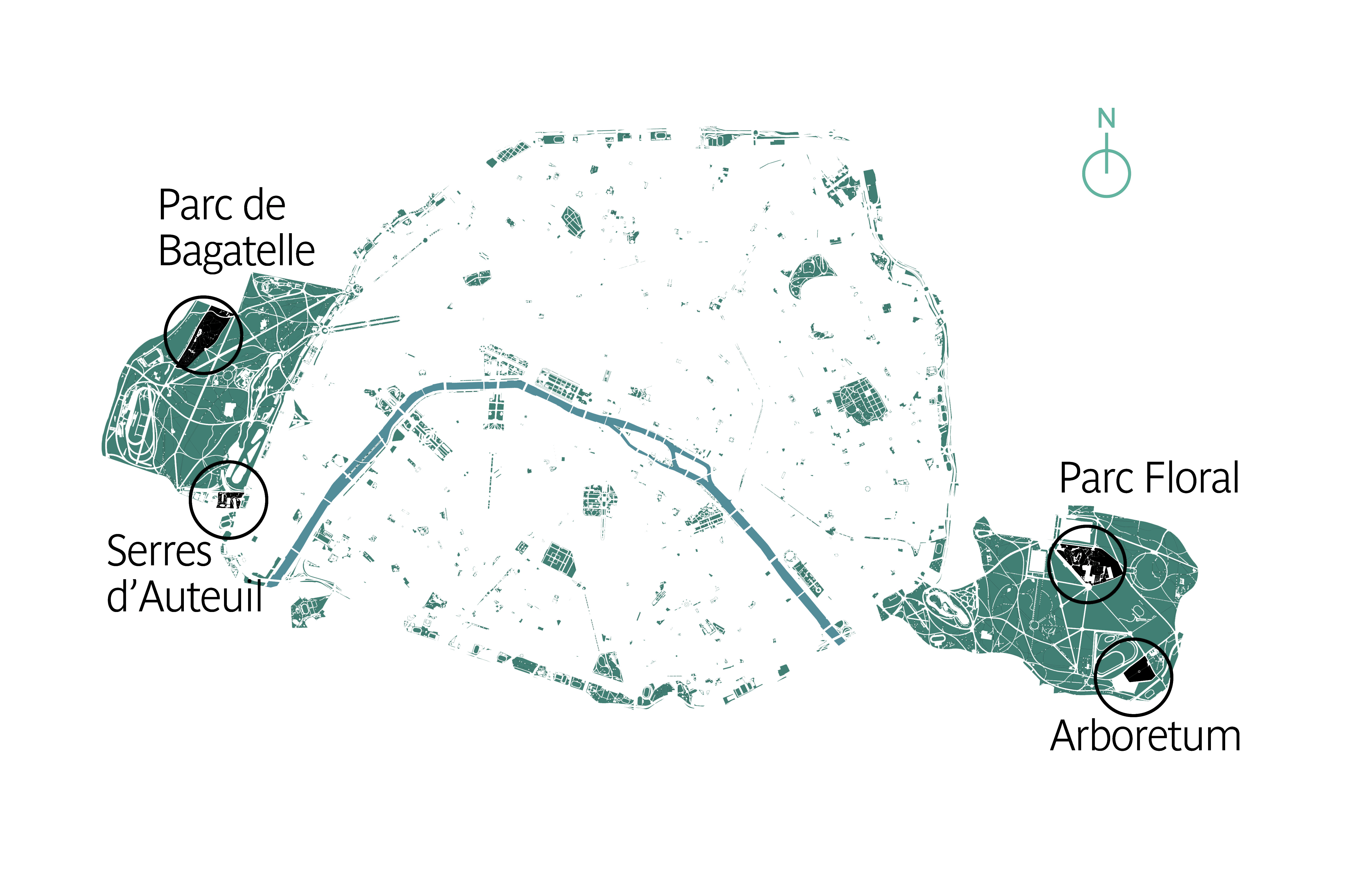
Location map of the sites of the Paris Botanical Garden

- In the Bois de Boulogne
  - Jardin des Serres d'Auteuil
  - Parc de Bagatelle
- In the Bois de Vincennes
  - Arboretum de l'École du Breuil
  - Parc floral de Paris

== See also ==
- List of botanical gardens in France
