= Jules Formigé =

French architect (1879–1960)

Jules Formigé (23 June 1879 – 17 August 1960) was a 20th-century French architect.

== Biography ==
Jules was born in Paris on 23 June 1879. He was the son of Jean-Camille Formigé. He was involved in the restoration of the Trophy of Augustus, Arènes de Lutèce, and the Chartreuse du Val-de-Bénédiction at Villeneuve-lès-Avignon. In 1909 he was one of the winners of the Concours de façades de la ville de Paris. He died in Paris on 17 August 1960.

The rue Jules Formigé in Arles is named after him.
