= Accolade (architecture) =

Type of arch common in late Gothic architecture

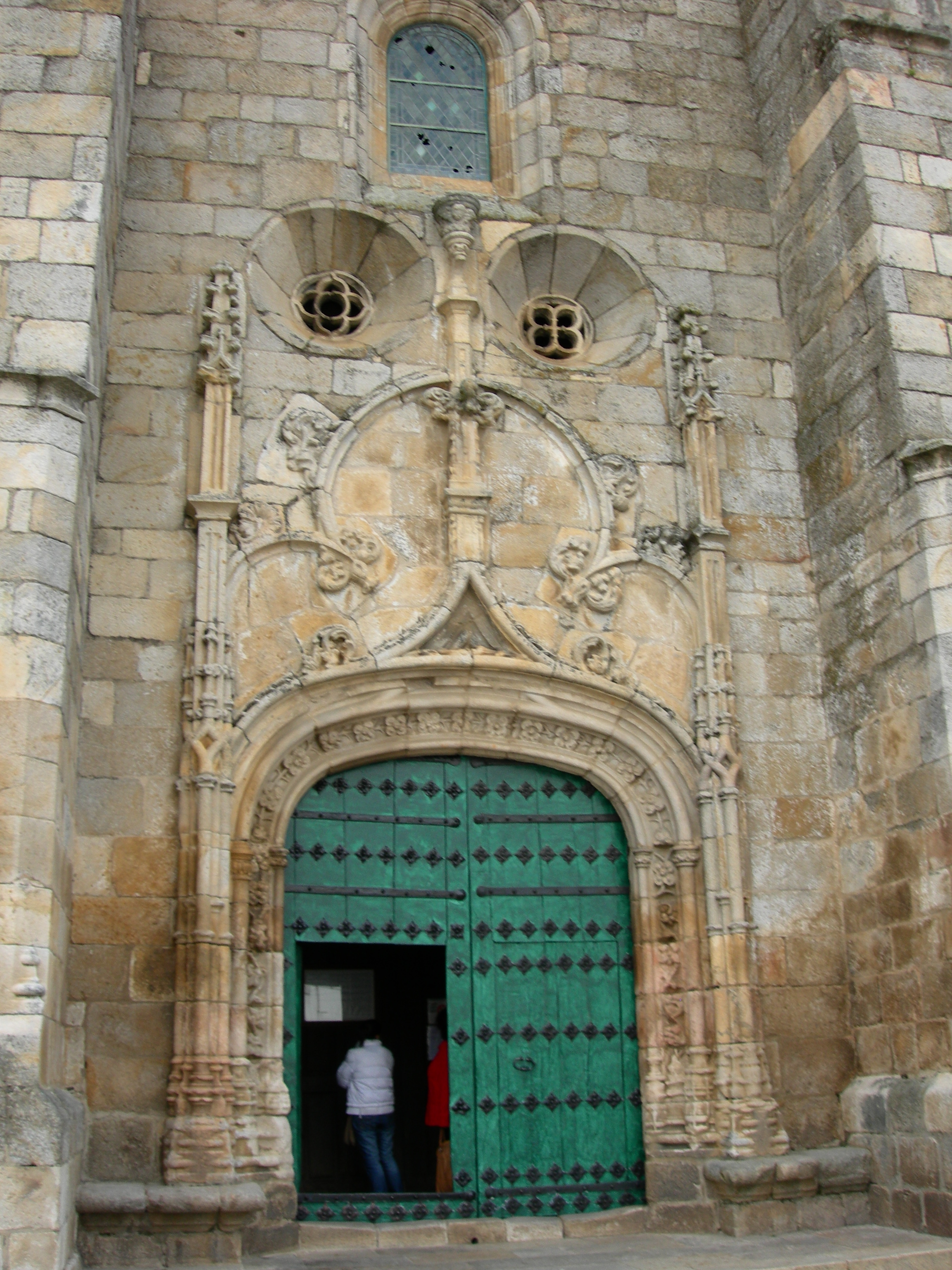
Accolade over an arch in Portugal

In architecture, an accolade is an embellished arch found most typically in late Gothic architecture. The term comes from French (l'accolade), referencing a "braced" arch. It is also known as an ogee arch (English), un arco conopial (Spanish), resaunt (Middle English), arco carenato or inflesso (Italian), and kielbogen (German).

An accolade is a pointed arch composed of two ogee curves, also known as sigmoid lines, which mirror one another. It can be formed by a pair of reverse ogee curves over a three-centred arch ending in a vertical finial. The form can also be described as the combination of a convex arch and a concave arch.

== Usage ==
An accolade is usually a decorative molding placed over an opening. The structures are unable to support significant loads, so they are primarily decorative. It has been primarily used over small openings like niches, tombs, windows, and screens as it is difficult to construct.

== History ==
The accolade was introduced and was most commonly used during the Decorated period of Gothic architecture. It was an element of Church architecture in England from the eleventh to sixteenth century. The peak of the accolade's popularity was during the thirteenth century. During the fourteenth century, there was an evolution in its appearance.

The first accolades in English Gothic architecture appear on the crosses constructed by Edward I in memory of Eleanor of Castile. They are also used in Gothic goldsmithing as in the shrine of St. Gertrude of Nivelles, which was originally built in the 13th century. The entrance to Saint-Seine-l'Abbaye is an accolade. The St. John's Church, and one of its major influences, Strawberry Hill House, incorporates accolades into its design.

Accolades appear as stylistic framing elements in artwork as early as the fifteenth century. It also appears in Dutch art, like the woodcut illustration in The Book of the Golden Throne.

== Influences ==
The form was likely imported to England during the Crusades. There exist accolades in the Byzantine style of architecture, as at the Monastery of St. Constantine on Lake Apolyon. Demus argues that the accolades, or ogee arches, at the Porta dei Fiori and the Tesoro entrance, have Islamic influences. Additionally, Venetian ogee arches resemble an Iranian mihrab niche that was brought to Paris. However, there is no consensus regarding how the accolade became an element of Gothic architecture.

== See also ==
- Ogee arch
- Gavaksha
- Mihrab
- Line of beauty
