= Amsterdam Nieuw-West =

Coordinates: 52°21′39″N 4°49′16″E

- Borough of Amsterdam
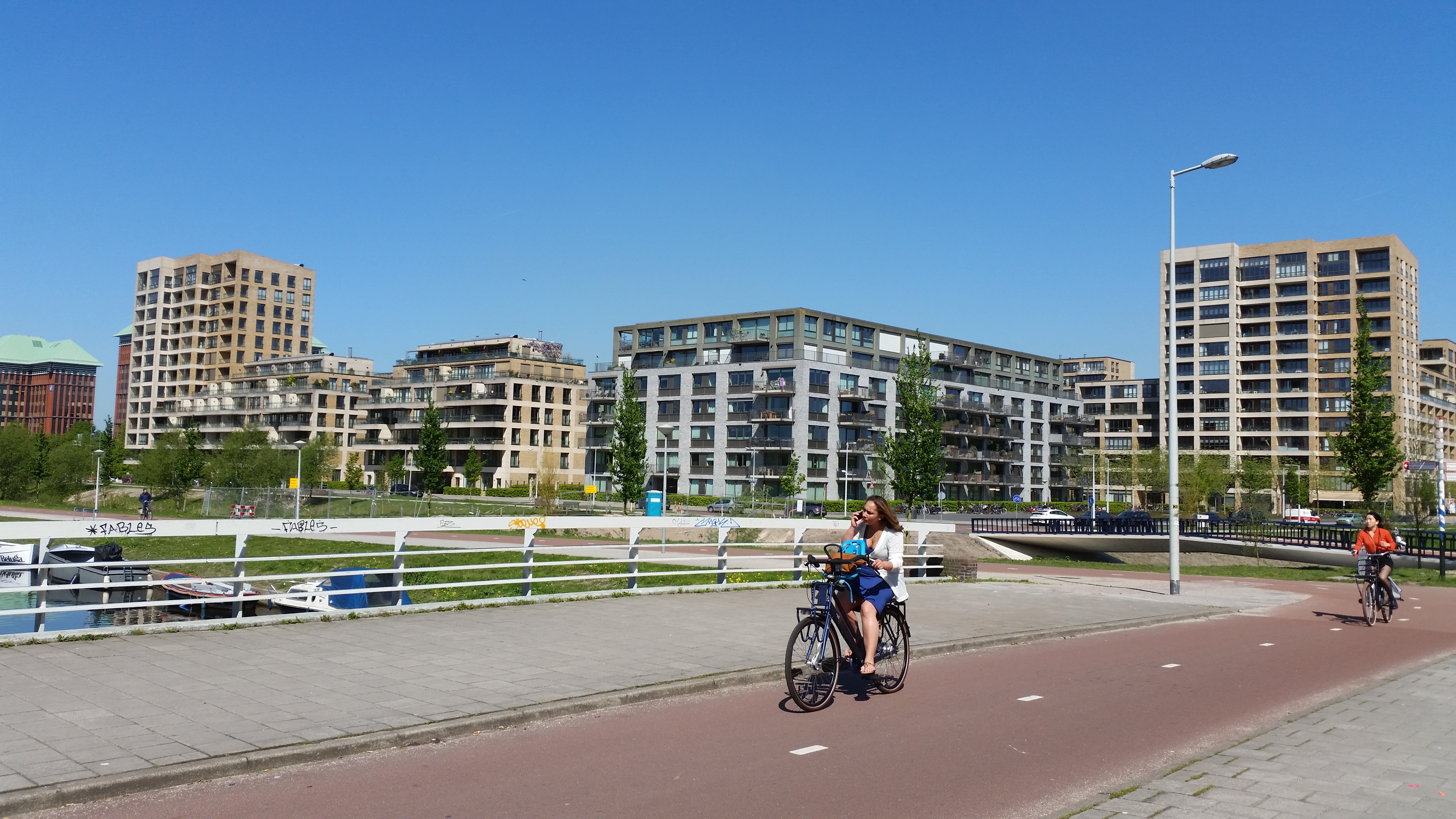
- Andreas Ensemble in Amsterdam Nieuw-West

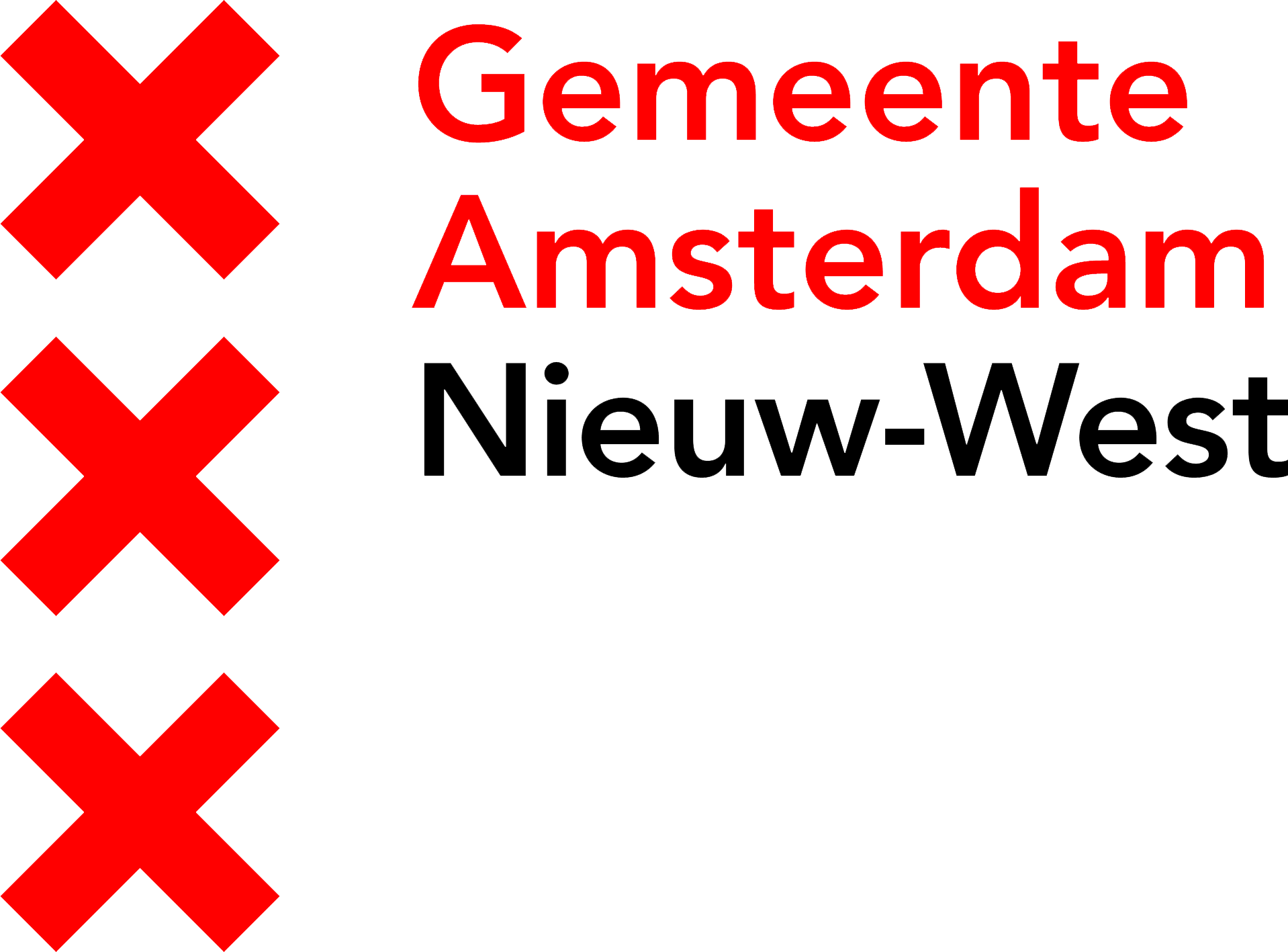
- Brandmark

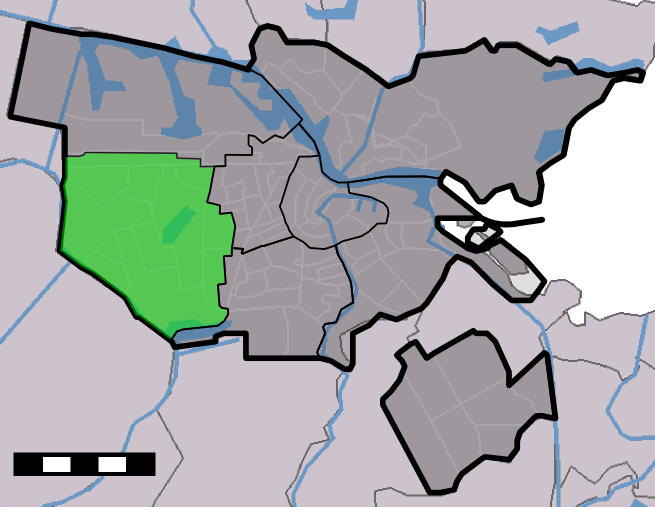
- Nieuw-West as part of Amsterdam
- Country: Netherlands
- Province: North Holland
- Municipality: Amsterdam

Area
  - Total: 32.38 km^{2} (12.50 sq mi)

Population (1 January 2021)
  - Total: 159,522
  - Density: 4,927/km^{2} (12,760/sq mi)
- Time zone: UTC+1 (CET)
- Area code: 020
- Website: https://www.amsterdam.nl/stadsdelen/nieuw-west/

Amsterdam Nieuw-West (Dutch pronunciation: [ˌɑmstərdɑmniuˈʋɛst]) is a borough (Dutch: stadsdeel) comprising the westernmost neighbourhoods of the city of Amsterdam, Netherlands. It was created in 2010 after a merger of the former boroughs Osdorp, Geuzenveld-Slotermeer and Slotervaart. In 2017, the borough had almost 150,000 inhabitants.

Most of the residential neighborhoods of Amsterdam Nieuw-West were built after 1950 under an urban expansion plan, based on the garden city concept. Centrally located within the borough are the Sloterplas (literal translation: Lake Sloter) and Sloterpark (around the lake).

== History ==
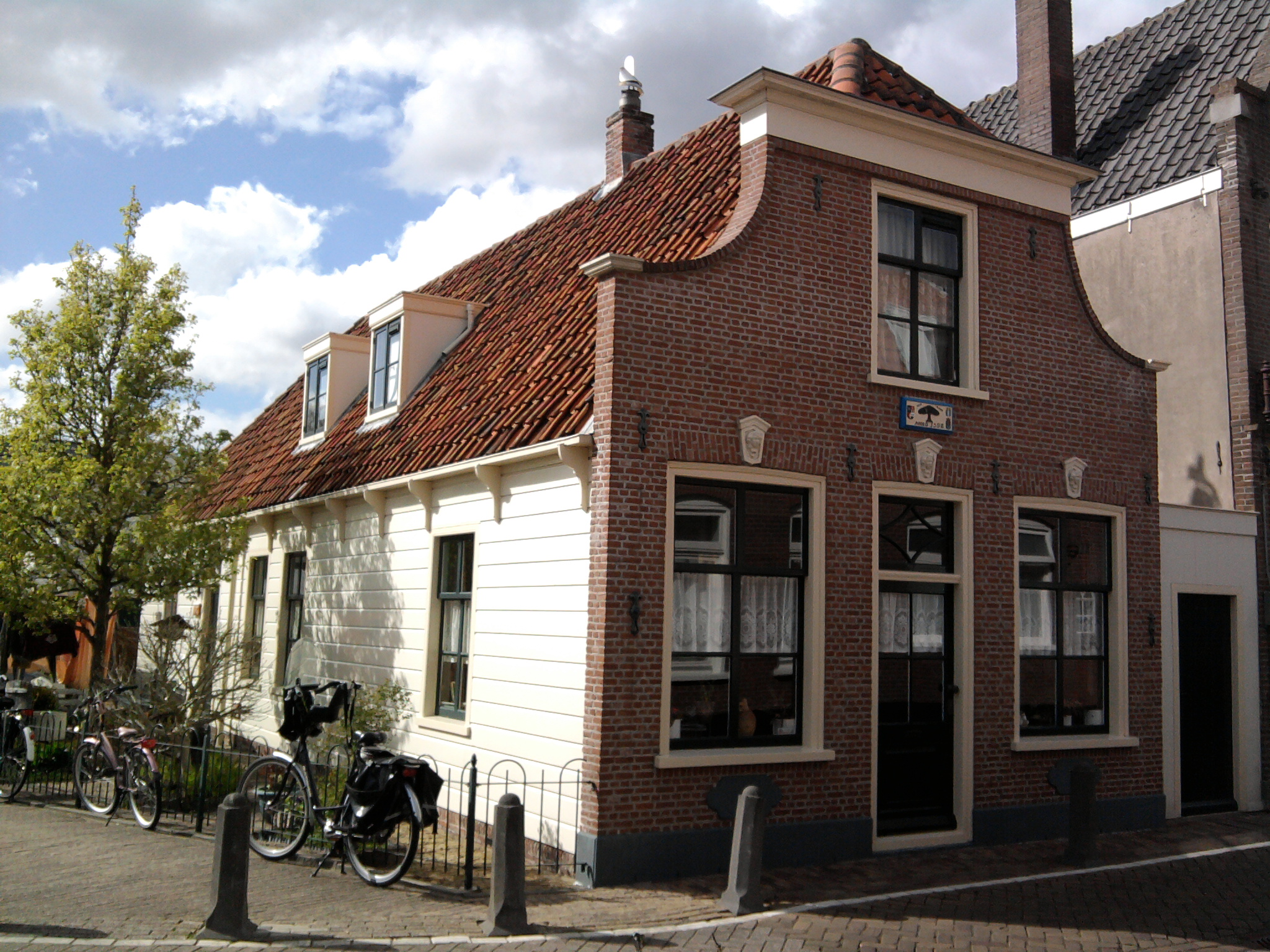
The town of Sloten was founded in the 11th century.

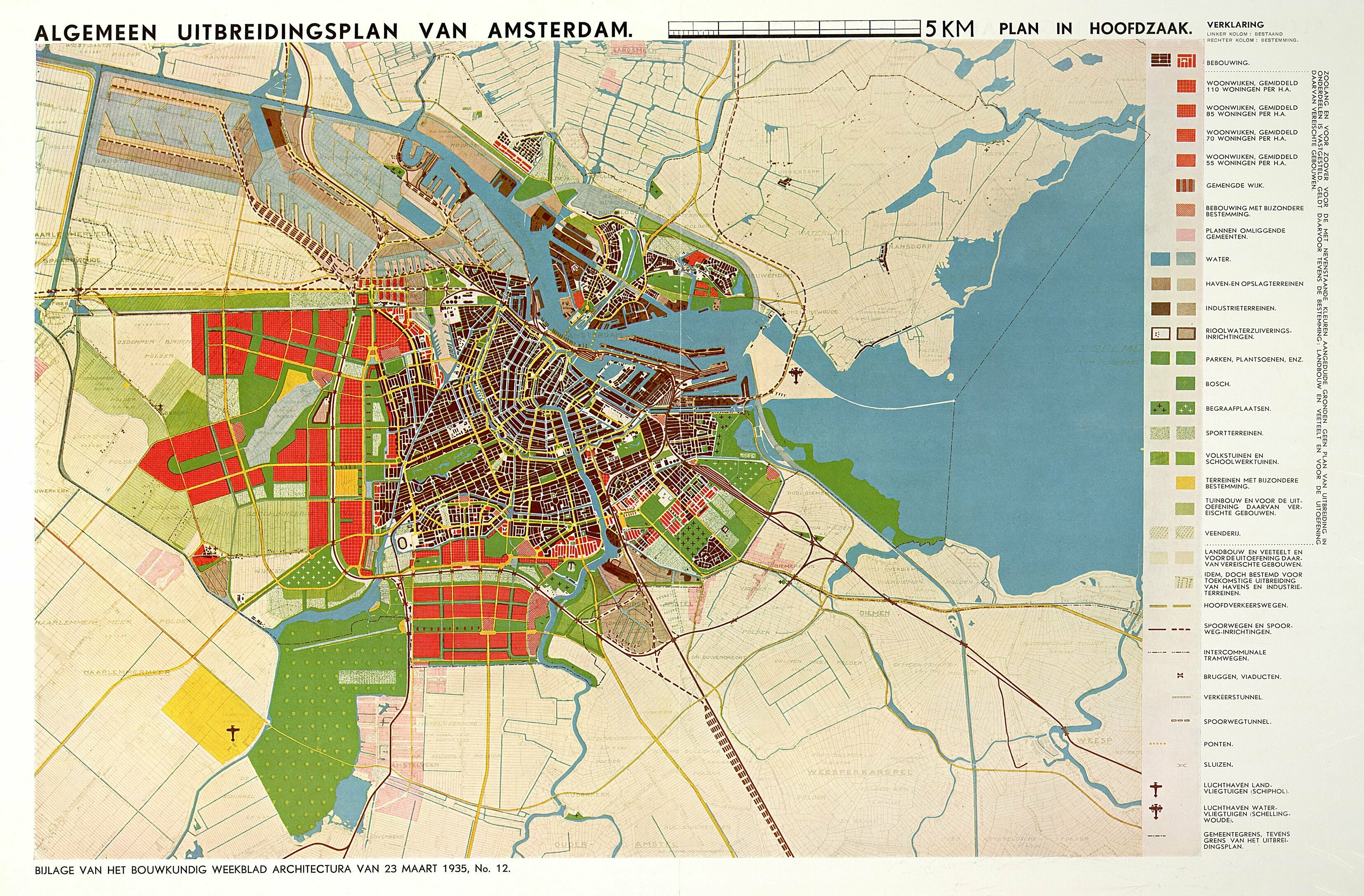
Algemeen Uitbreidingsplan (1935), the urban expansion plan for Nieuw-West

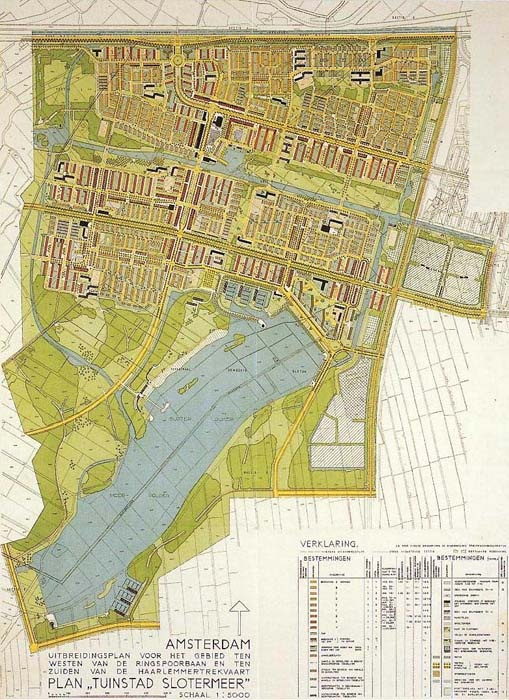
Plan Slotermeer, 1939

Nieuw-West (English: New West) is a sprawling, high-density suburban residential area in the west of Amsterdam. It is situated on the territory of the former municipality of Sloten, Amsterdam, a town dating back to 1063 which has become part of the borough. The plans for the western expansion of the city date back to 1935, when the Algemeen Uitbreidingsplan (General Expansion Plan) was adopted. The neighbourhoods in Nieuw-West are designed on the basis of the garden city principles: planned, self-contained communities surrounded by greenbelts. Most of these neighborhoods, known as the Westelijke Tuinsteden (Western Garden Cities) were built in the 1950s and 1960s. At the heart of the borough is the Sloterplas, a lake, surrounded by a large park, the Sloterpark. The lake was created as a result of sand extractions needed for the development of the garden city neighbourhoods.

The oldest garden city neighbourhoods are Slotermeer, Geuzenveld, Slotervaart, Overtoomse Veld and Osdorp. In the 1990s, a few additional neighbourhoods were developed: Oostoever, Nieuw Sloten and De Aker (included in Osdorp).

Since 2001, the borough has been subject to extensive urban renewal projects. Under the Richting Parkstad 2015 plan, thousands of homes were demolished and replaced by new developments. With the renewal projects, the original garden city ideas have been partially abandoned. In 2007, the Bos en Lommer neighbourhood, now part of the borough of Amsterdam-West, was marked aandachtswijk (disadvantaged neighborhood) by Minister of Housing Ella Vogelaar which made national urban renewal funds and programmes available to the area. The city of Amsterdam subsequently decided to apply the same status to the northeast and southwest of Slotermeer, Geuzenveld, central Osdorp, and Slotervaart in Nieuw-West.

== Borough government ==
Until 2014, the Amsterdam boroughs, called stadsdelen or 'districts', were governed by a directly elected district council (deelraad) as well as a separate district executive board, the members of which were appointed and controlled by the council. Since the 2014 municipal elections, the district councils have been abolished and replaced by smaller, but still directly elected district committees (bestuurscommissies). The district committees are elected every four years, on the same day as the city's central municipal council. Each district committee elects three of its members to form an executive committee (dagelijks bestuur). The district committees' jurisdiction is determined by the central municipal council. Responsibilities delegated to the 2014–2018 district committees include parks and recreation, streets and squares, refuse collection, permits and events, preparation of zoning plans, passports and drivers licenses, and welfare work.

The district committee of Amsterdam Nieuw-West consists of 15 members. The committee was elected on March 19, 2014. Six national political parties and three local parties are represented on the committee. In April 2014, the committee elected its executive committee. Executive committee chair is Achmed Baâdoud (PvdA), the other members are Ronald Mauer (D66) and Erik Bobeldijk (SP).

District Committee Nieuw-West	D66	PvdA	SP	VVD	CDA	GL	BNW81	MPP	PvdO	Denk	50plus
2014 elections	3	3	2	2	1	1	1	1	1		
2018 elections	1	3		4		4				3	1

The borough office (stadsdeelkantoor or 'district office') of Amsterdam Nieuw-West is located at Osdorpplein 946.

== Neighborhoods ==
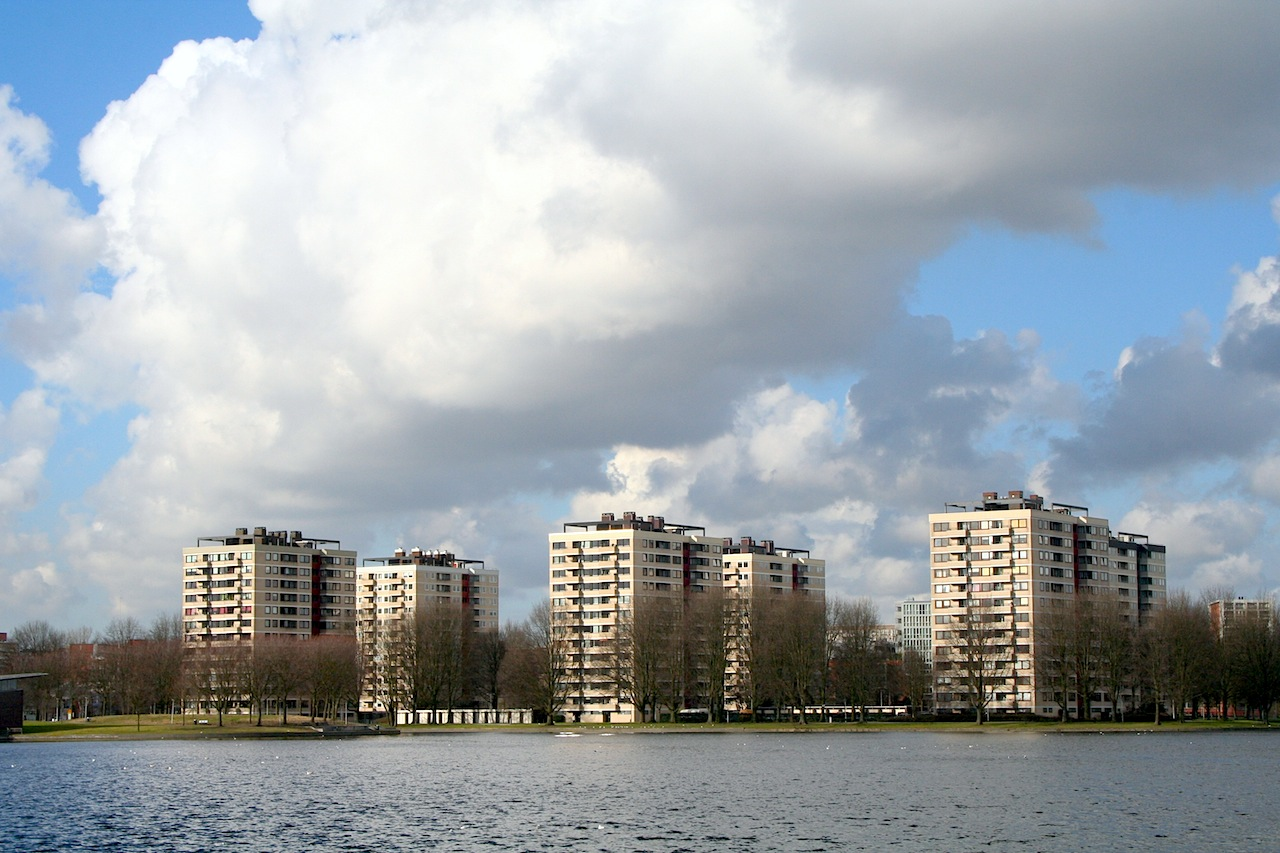
Sloterplas, Slotermeer.

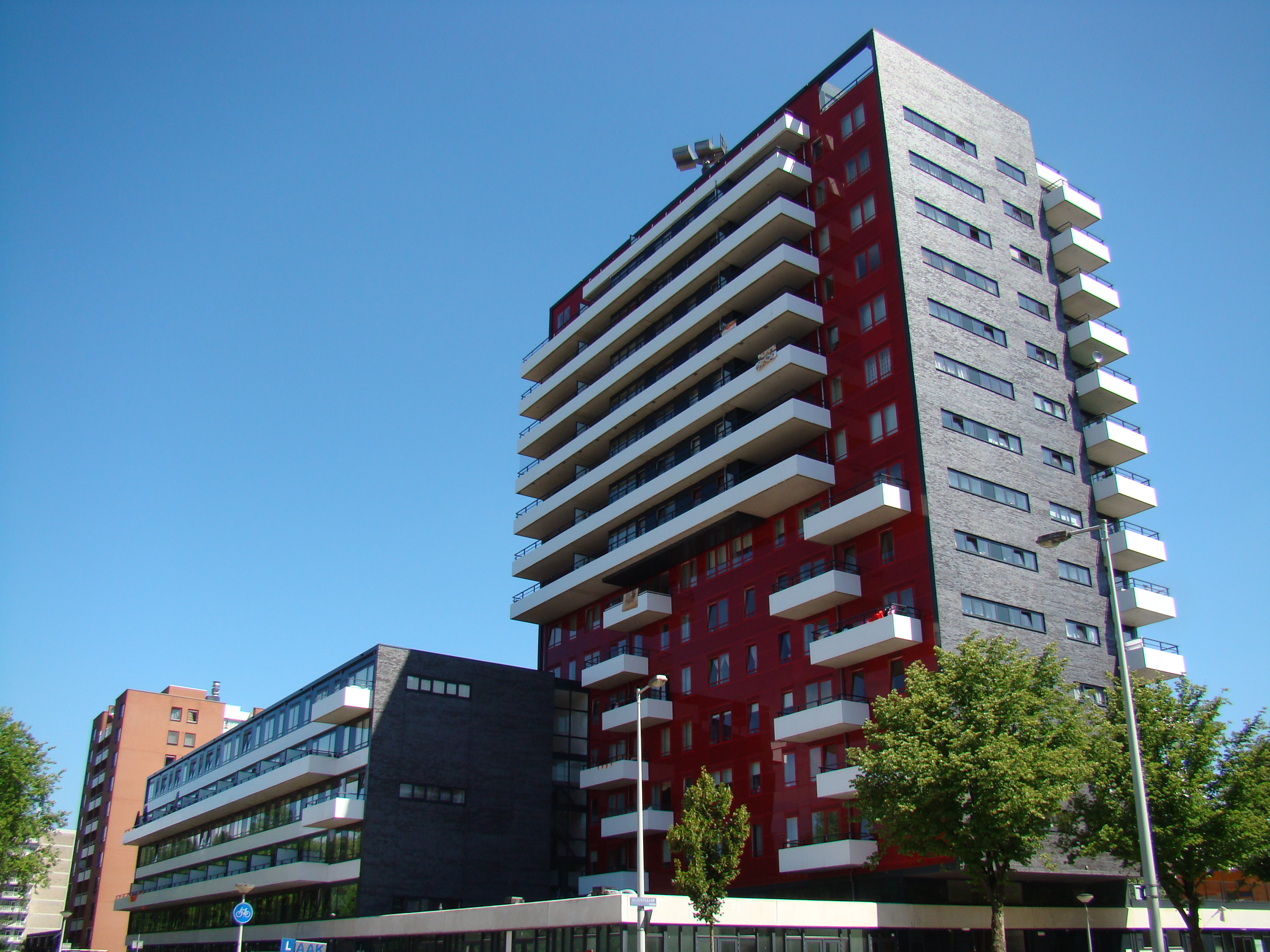
Urban renewal in Osdorp.

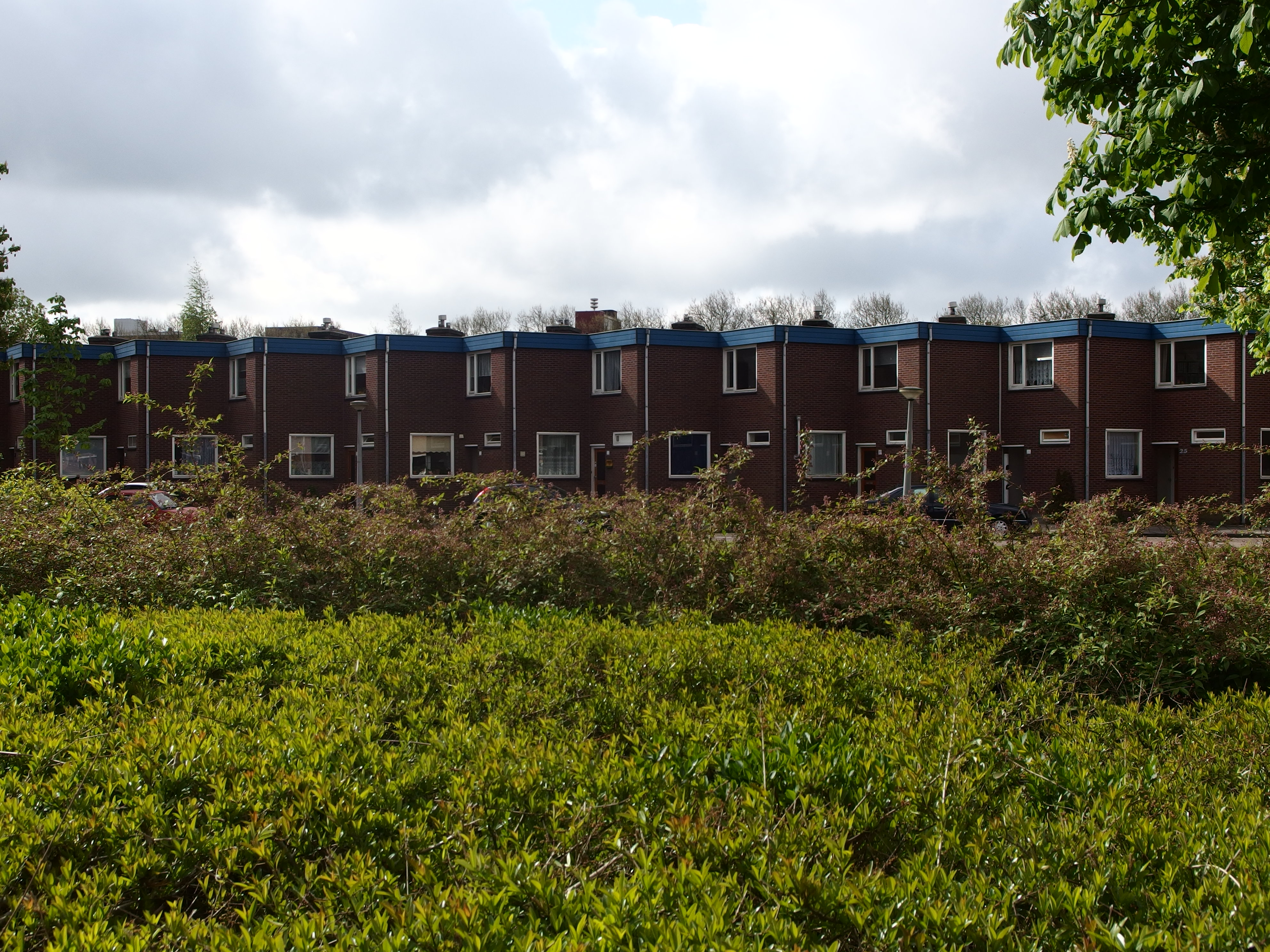
Bluebanddorp, Slotervaart.

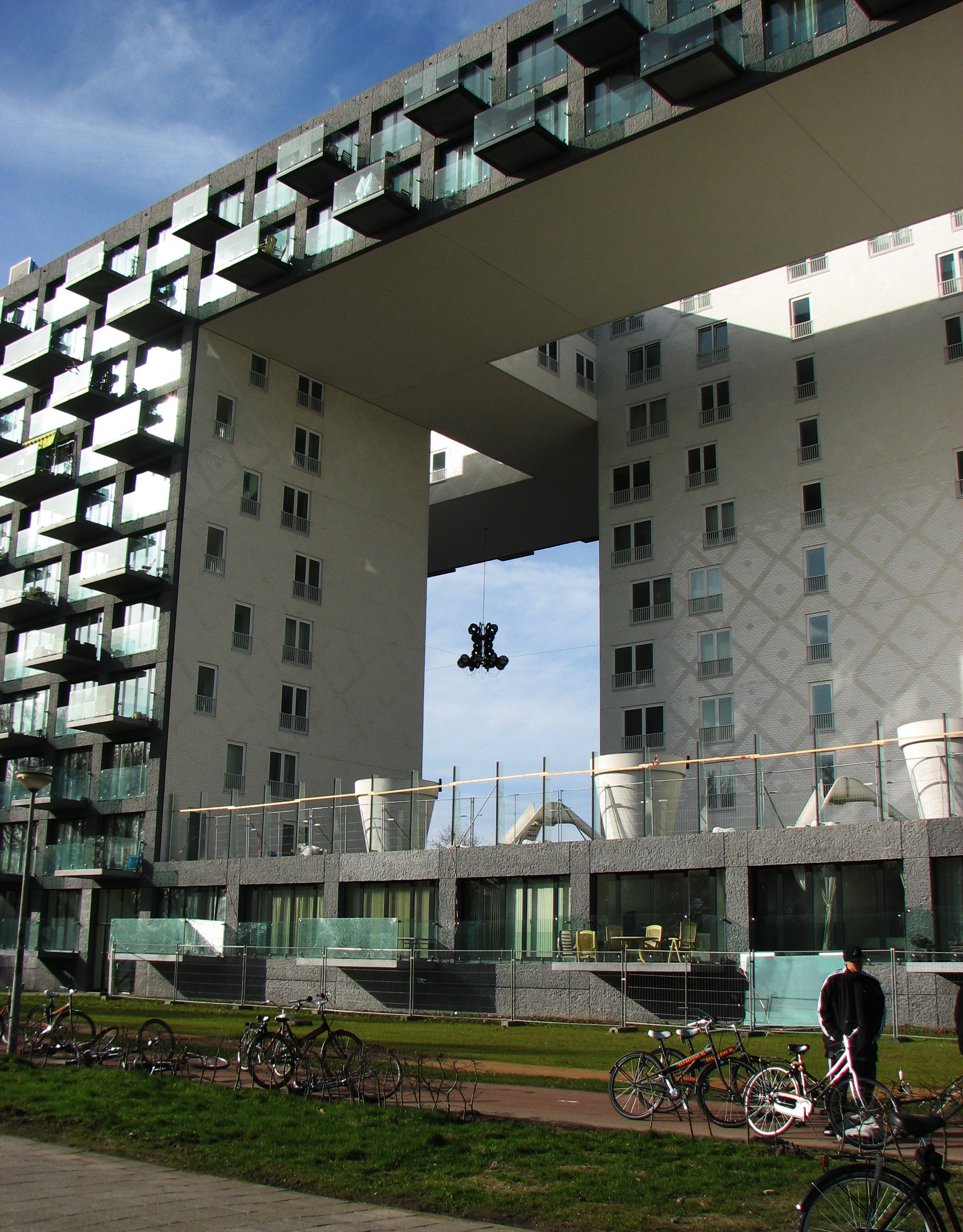
Parkrandgebouw, urban renewal in Geuzenveld.

Nieuw-West formally consists of the following nine neighborhoods, as determined by the borough administration:

- Geuzenveld (including De Eendracht)
- Nieuw Sloten
- Oostoever
- Osdorp (including De Aker and Middelveldsche Akerpolder)
- Oud Osdorp
- Overtoomse Veld
- Sloten
- Slotermeer
- Slotervaart
