= Sloterpark =

Public park in Amsterdam, the Netherlands

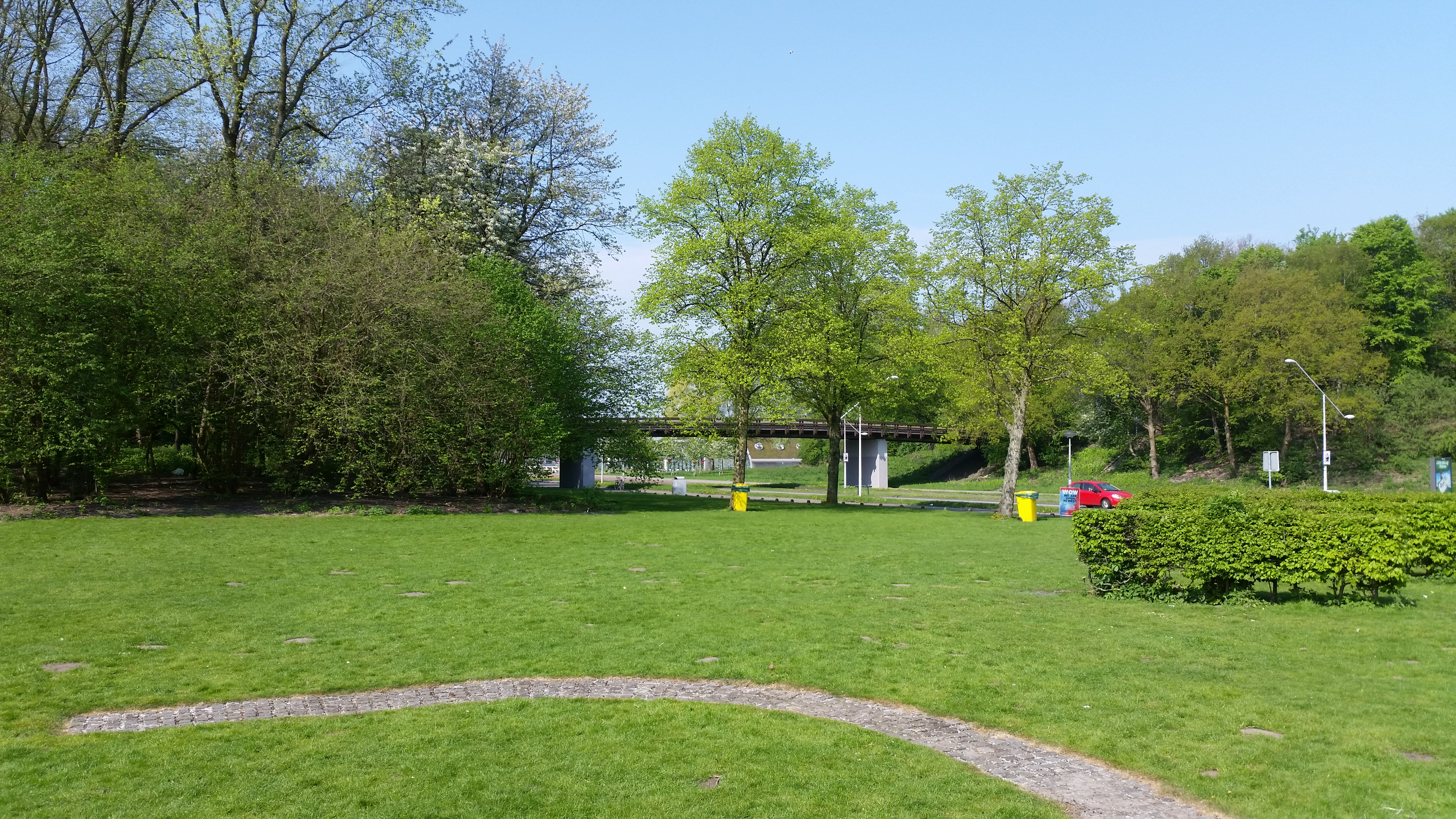
- Bridge 677 about the President Allendelaan connects the western and eastern parts of the Sloterpark
- Interactive map of Sloterpark
- Type: Urban park
- Location: Amsterdam Nieuw-West, Netherlands
- Coordinates: 52°21′53″N 4°49′20″E
- Area: 48 ha (120 acres)
- Created: 1974
- Operator: Amsterdam Nieuw-West
- Status: Open all year

Sloterpark is an urban park in Amsterdam, the Netherlands. Located in the borough Amsterdam Nieuw-West, around the artificial lake Sloterplas.

== History ==
It is the heart of the Westelijke Tuinsteden ("Western Garden Cities"), built between 1958 and 1974 as part of the implementation of the General Enlargement Plan of 1935 (Algemeen Uitbreidingsplan). it is based on the organizational logic desired by Cornelis van Eesteren for his garden cities, built around four axes: housing, employment, leisure and transport.

When the city established its boroughs in 1990, the lake was divided into three: Geuzenveld-Slotermeer, Slotervaart and Osdorp. Since 2010, it has been an integral part of the Nieuw-West borough.

== Activities ==
There is a trail for walkers, joggers, cyclists and skaters called the 'Rondje Sloterplas' around the lake. Along the route is exercise equipment, a skatepark and a football pitch. There is a petting zoo for children and a nature playground.

The lake has a beach with a nearby swimming pool which includes an outdoor pool, a paddling pool, a sunbathing area and a playground.

The water sports centre has a marina. Canoes, surfboards and sailing boats are available for rent including lessons. The disc golf club has an official competition course.

== Gallery ==
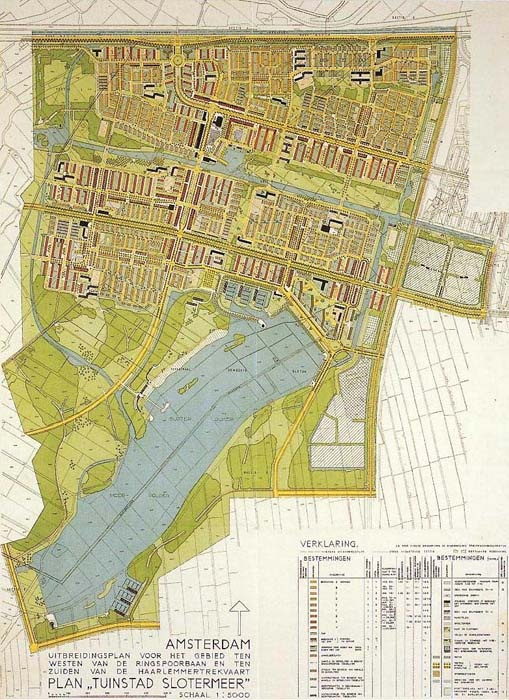
The original plan from 1939 for Slotermeer, Sloterplas and Sloterpark

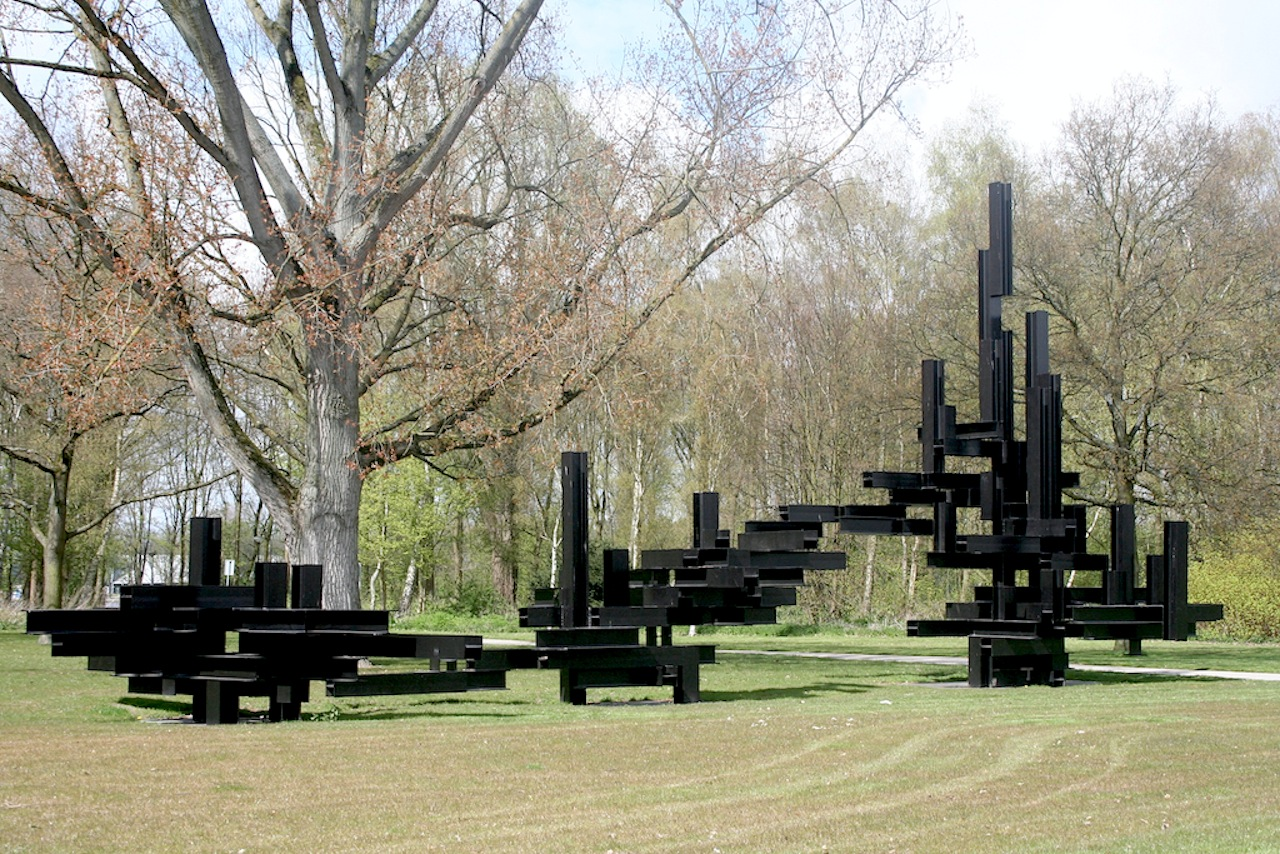
'Constructie I-BEANS DIN 30' from 1969 by André Volten, at the Oostoever in the Sloterpark.

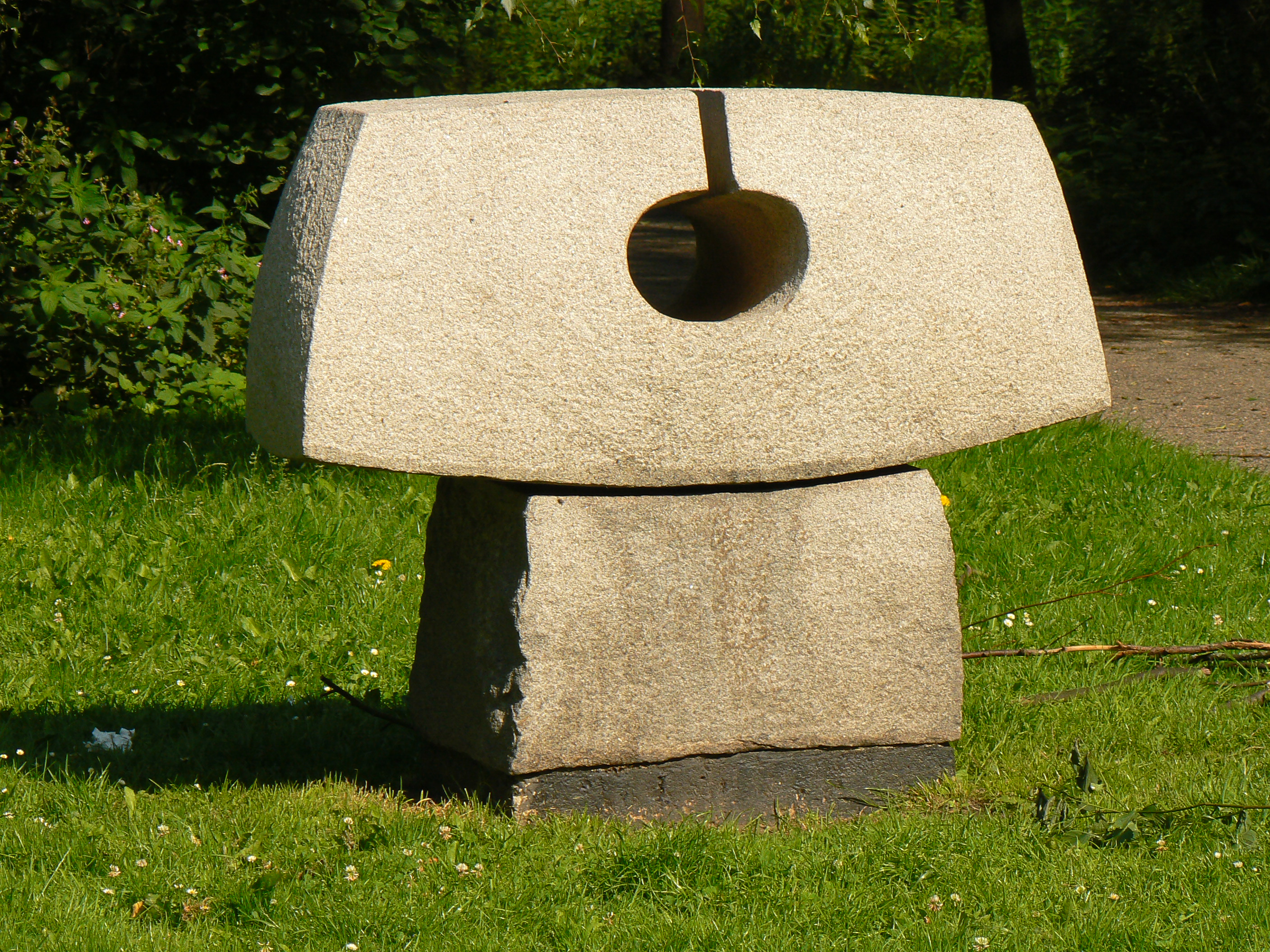
'Zonder titel' (1972) granite sculpture by Ad Molendijk

== Bibliography ==
- The parks of Amsterdam. Ernest Kurpershoek & Merel Ligtelijn. Publisher Lubberhuizen. 2001
