= Slotermeer =

Coordinates: 52°23′N 4°49′E

- Neighborhood of Amsterdam
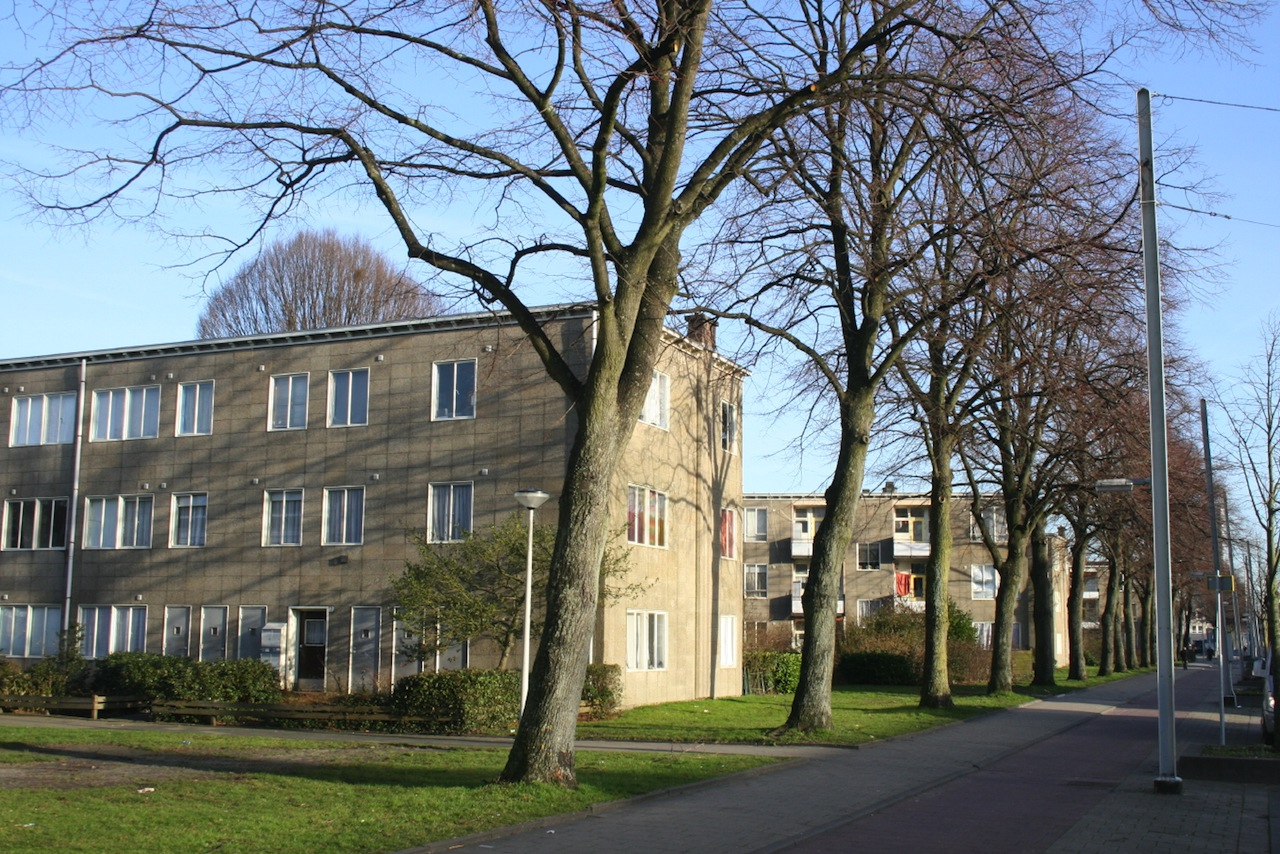
- Airey houses at Burgemeester de Vlugtlaan in Slotermeer, Amsterdam Nieuw-West.
- Interactive map of Slotermeer
- Country: Netherlands
- Province: North Holland
- COROP: Amsterdam
- Time zone: UTC+1 (CET)
- Postal code: 1063, 1064

Slotermeer is a neighborhood of Amsterdam, Netherlands, in the Dutch province of North Holland. The name of Slotermeer comes from the Slootermeer Lake that used to be in this area.

== History ==
Slotermeer is part of a larger neighborhood called Westelijke Tuinsteden. Following the creation of the Algemeen Uitbreidingsplan in 1935, the first outline for the Slotermeer neighbourhood was drawn up in 1939. The Slootermeer Lake was drained in 1644. This formed the Sloterdijkermeerpolder (a polder), which was excavated into the Sloterplas between 1948 and 1956.

=== Garden village ===
In November 1927, the municipality of Amsterdam decided that the land west of the Ringspoorbaan would primarily be used for single-family houses. The housing department was tasked to work out a plan in cooperation with Public works for the construction of an area of about 400 hectares. The garden village would be built in the same style as other garden villages that were built around that time, such as Betondorp, Nieuwendam and Tuindorp Oostzaan. Discussions between the housing department and Public works fell flat and the plan was abandoned.

However, they did keep discussing about a small triangular section of 23 hectares between the Ringspoorbaan, the Haarlemmerweg and the unrealised connection to the Haarlem railway. This downscaled plan envisaged strokenbouw (construction in parallel rows), in the same vein as the ‘Neue Sachlichkeit’ of the new neighborhoods built in Frankfurt am Main in the 1920s. Again, this plan was abandoned as well due to disagreements and it was decided to wait for the Algemeen Uitbreidingsplan first.

=== Garden city ===
As a result of World War II, the construction of Slotermeer was delayed by more than a decade. Construction began on 1 December 1951, and in late 1952, the first houses were ready to be lived in. On 7 October 1952, the first Garden City of Amsterdam outside the Ringspoorbaan was officially opened by Queen Juliana.

A part of Slotermeer was declared protected townscape by the District Council in 2007, namely the Van Eesteren Museum, a museum dedicated to Cornelis van Eesteren. Nevertheless, in 2009 it was decided to proceed with large-scale demolition in the northern and southern part of Slotermeer as part of urban renewal.

== Location and surroundings ==
Slotermeer is bordered to the north by the Haarlemmerweg and to the south by the Sloterplas (a lake) and Sloterpark, as well as Sportpark Ookmeer. The eastern boundary is the Ringspoorbaan, the western boundary the Eendrachtspark and Geuzeneiland (a small island). At the heart of the neighbourhood is the Gerbrandypark.

The neighbourhood consists of a mixture of low, medium, and high-rise buildings and was fully built up by the mid-1960s. Many streets are named after World War II resistance fighters, mayors of Amsterdam and Dutch writers from the nineteenth and early twentieth centuries. Plein '40-'45 (the town square) and the south side of the Burgemeester de Vlugtlaan and the west side of the Slotermeerlaan form the centre of the neighbourhood, featuring an indoor mall, shops, a local market, the Vrijheidscarillon, the Garden City House (an office building), hotels, offices and a small harbour.

The first few years, Slotermeer had a tram connection to the city centre with a stop along the Amsterdam - Zandvoort tram network. On 1 September 1957, the tram was replaced by a bus service. In September 1954, tramway 13 was the first Amsterdam tramway to be extended beyond the Ringspoor dyke from Bos en Lommerplein to Slotermeer. The tram got its last stop at the end of the Slotermeerlaan (an avenue), near Sloterpark. In 1974, tramway 13 was extended to Geuzenveld and the last section to Sloterplas was cancelled. In 1989, tramway 13 was relocated to the new route via the Jan van Galenstraat - Burgemeester Röellstraat. The old route then became part of tramway 14, until 22 July 2018 when tramway 14 was cancelled. Since 2004, tramway 7 has also been added.

When stadsdelen (borough) were established in 1990, the neighbourhood became part of Geuzenveld-Slotermeer. Since 2010, it has been part of the stadsdeel Amsterdam Nieuw-West.

== Urban renewal ==
With the approval of the Renewal Plan, the urban renewal of Slotermeer began in 2003. This plan was part of the major urban renewal project launched by Bureau Parkstad covering all of the Westelijke Tuinsteden.

One of the most striking projects is the major renovation of the Grote en Kleine Verfdoos, two colourful apartment buildings with shops on the Slotermeerlaan and Lodewijk van Deysselstraat. These buildings from 1954, designed by Allert Warners, were renovated in 2010 to a design by Van Schagen Architects. A second renovation project is the school building De Kans by architect Rowin Petersma. This school is a defining Amsterdam "H-school" (a H-shaped school), of which four of the nine schools of this type that were built are located in Slotermeer. Another H-school, the Slootermeerschool at the Burgemeester Fockstraat 85, is a protected monument and is on the top-100 list of post-war heritage for Amsterdam.

Other projects include the renovation of the buildings on the Confuciusplein (a plaza) by architect Erna van Sambeek, new residential buildings by Margreet Duinker in the Socratesstraat and the new construction of a Multifunctional Centre called the De Honingraat (the honeycomb) on Slotermeerlaan by Dick van Gameren. In the development of new buildings on the Bernard Loderstraat, residents had an important say in the subdivision and design of the buildings.
