= Geuzenveld-Slotermeer =

- neighborhood
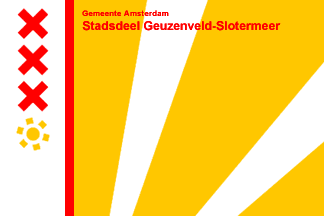
- Flag

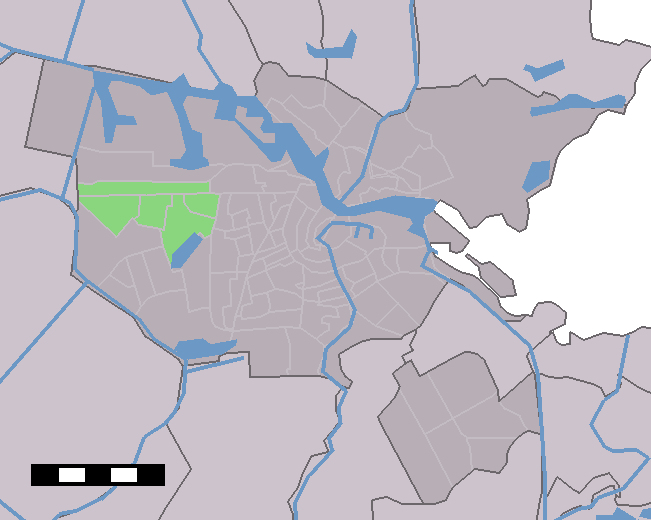
- Geuzenveld-Slotermeer as part of Amsterdam
- Coordinates: 52°22′42″N 4°48′24″E
- Country: Netherlands
- Province: North Holland
- Municipality (Gemeente): Amsterdam
- Borough (Stadsdeel): Nieuw-West
- Time zone: UTC+1 (CET)
- Area code: 020

Geuzenveld-Slotermeer is a neighborhood and former borough (stadsdeel) comprising some of the most western parts of the city of Amsterdam, Netherlands. It existed as a borough from 1990 until 2010, when it merged with the boroughs Osdorp and Slotervaart to form the new borough Amsterdam Nieuw-West.

== Neighorhoods ==
Geuzenveld-Slotermeer comprised the following neighborhoods and areas:

- Eendracht
- Geuzenveld
- Spieringhorn
- Slotermeer
