= Osdorp =

Coordinates: 52°22′N 4°47′E

- Neighborhood of Amsterdam
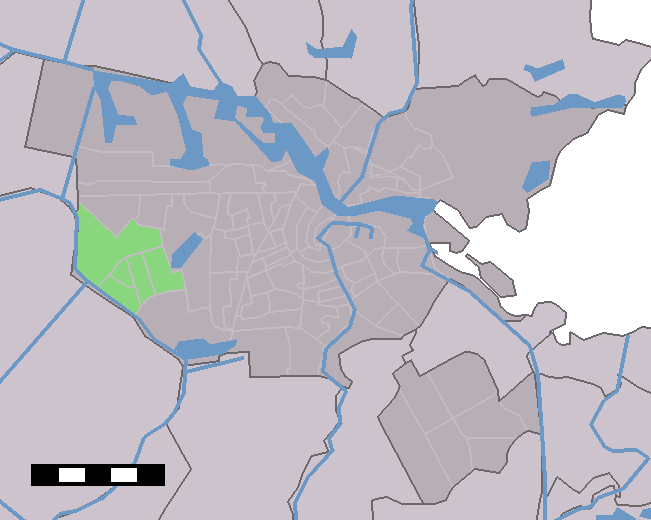
- Location of former borough of Osdorp
- Country: Netherlands
- Province: North Holland
- COROP: Amsterdam
- Borough: Nieuw-West
- Time zone: UTC+1 (CET)

Osdorp (Dutch pronunciation: [ˈɔzdɔr(ə)p]) is neighbourhood of Amsterdam, Netherlands. A larger area was, from 1981 until 2010, a stadsdeel (borough) of Amsterdam and in 2010 was merged into the new borough of Amsterdam Nieuw-West.

== Neighborhood ==
The core neighborhood of Osdorp is centered on Osdorpplein square and its 150-store shopping center. As the borough of Nieuw-West officially defines neighborhoods, Osdorp is actually split between the neighborhoods of "Nieuw-West Midden" and "Osdorp West".

== Former borough ==
The former borough of Osdorp contained the following neighborhoods:

- Osdorp
- De Aker* (Middelveldsche Akerpolder)
- Lutkemeer
- Ookmeer
- Oud Osdorp (former village)
- Sloten (village, now officially part of the neighborhood "Sloten and Nieuw-Sloten"*)

The borough had (in late 2006) 45,627 residents and was 11.3 square kilometres (4.4 mi^{2}) in size.
