= Slotervaart =

Slotervaart may refer to:

- Slotervaart (neighborhood) (Tuinstad Slotervaart), a neighborhood of Amsterdam (since 1955)
- Slotervaart (former borough) (Stadsdeel Slotervaart), a former borough of Amsterdam (1990–2010), which included the neighborhood Slotervaart, now part of the borough Amsterdam Nieuw-West
