= Sloten, Amsterdam =

Village and neighborhood of Amsterdam in North Holland, Netherlands

Sloten
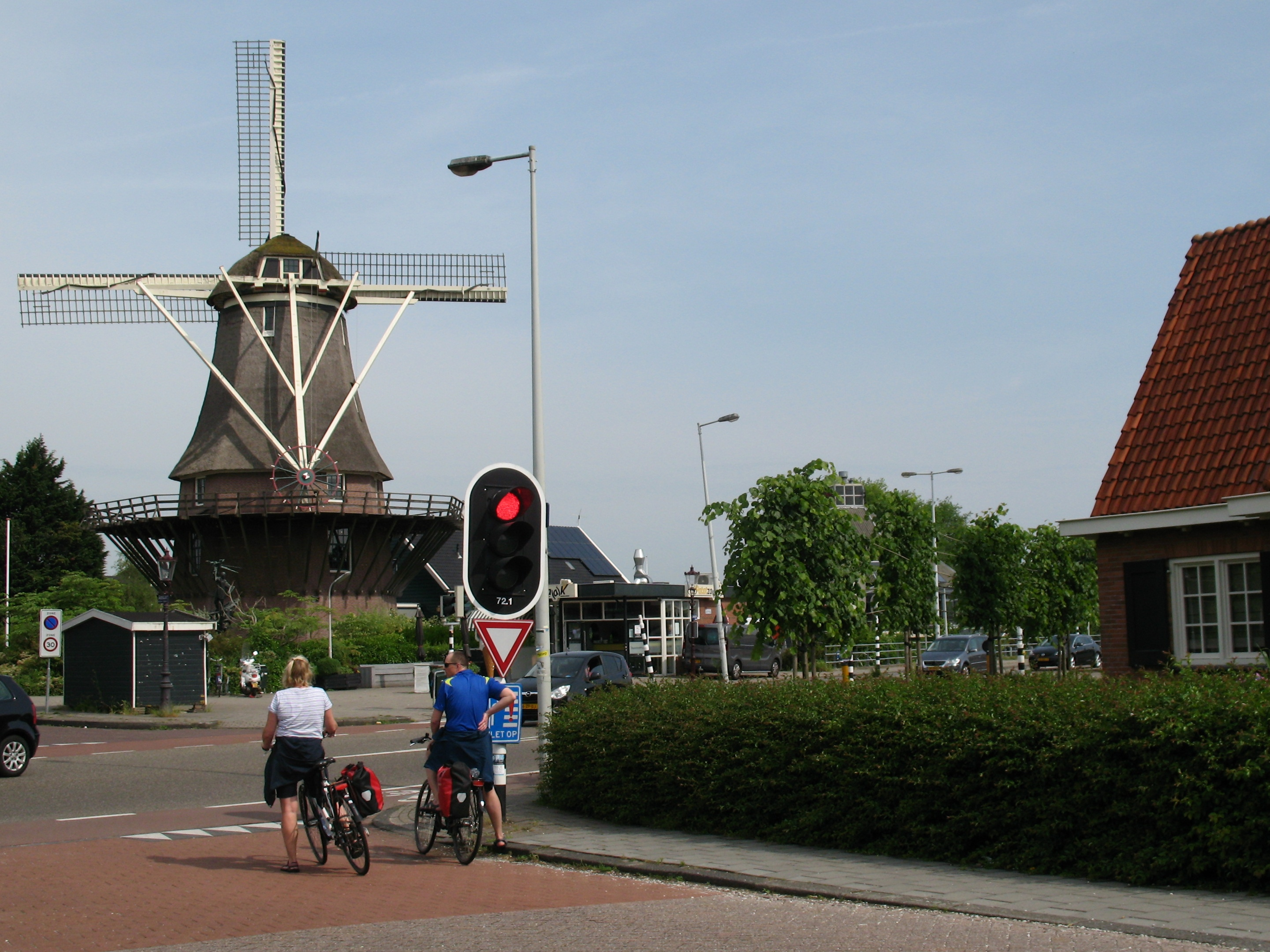
- Molen van Sloten or Sloten mill, May 2008

- Flag Coat of arms

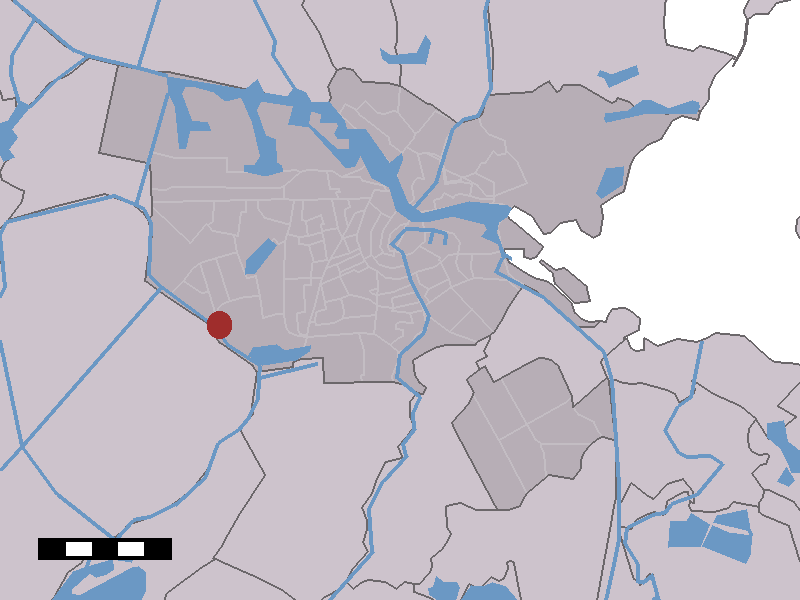
- Sloten in the municipality of Amsterdam.

- Amsterdam within North Holland
- Coordinates: 52°20′31″N 4°47′49″E
- Country: Netherlands
- Province: North Holland
- Municipality: Amsterdam
- Stadsdeel: Slotervaart
- Borough: Osdorp
- Postal code: 1066 ..
- Website: http://www.dorpsraadslotenoudosdorp.nl/

Sloten (Dutch pronunciation: [ˈsloːtə(n)]; 52.342°N 4.797°E) is a village in the Dutch province of North Holland. It is a part of the municipality of Amsterdam, and lies about 6 km west of the city centre.

Sloten became a separate municipality in 1816. Absorbed into Amsterdam in January 1921, Sloten (founded in the year 990) became the oldest part of Amsterdam (itself founded in 1254). Sloten is one of the few remnants of various places that have marks of Osdorp before the 1950s and Sloterdijk as well; Sloten was threatened by urbanisation on many occasions between the 1950s and the 1970s, as thousands of houses rose between the wide polderland of the Osdorp region. Sloten remained untouched by suburban growth until in the 1980s, when the Netherlands campaigned to host the 1992 Summer Olympics. Officials proposed that the area around Sloten become an Olympic Village. When Barcelona was instead chosen to be the host, they changed plans and built to create Nieuw Sloten, which rose in the 1990s.

During the 1928 Summer Olympics in Amsterdam, Sloten hosted the rowing events. Now it is best known for the working windmill, transformed into the Rembrandt Sloten Windmill museum.

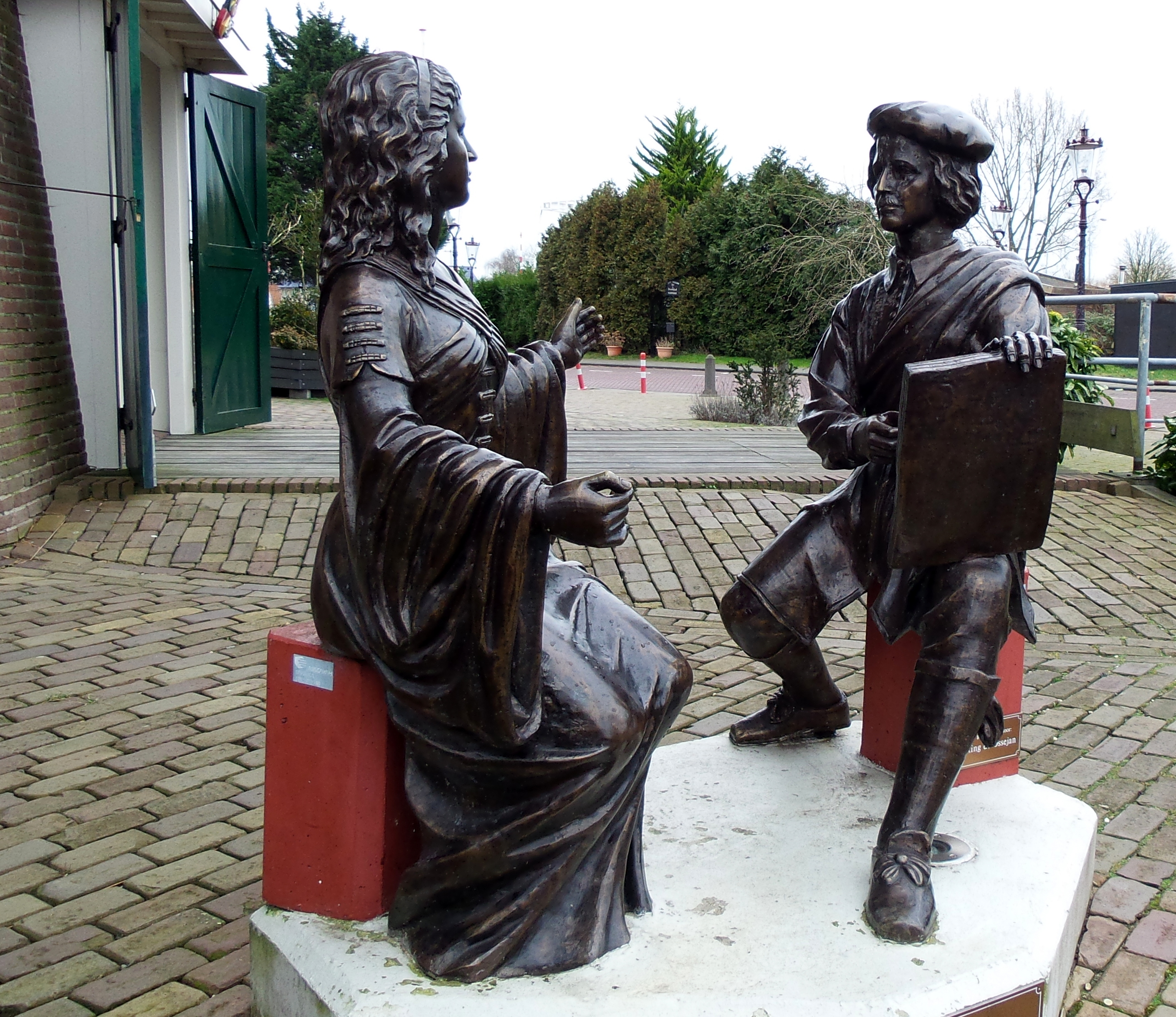
Statues of Saskia and Rembrandt beside the Rembrandt Sloten Windmill/Coopery Museum in Sloten, Amsterdam.

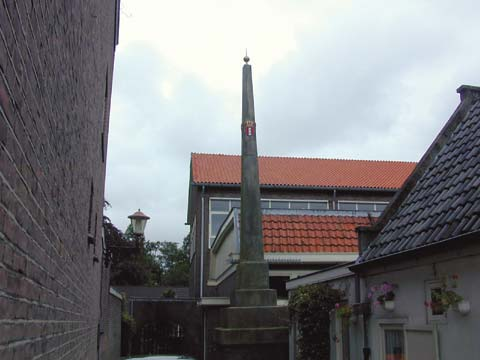
Old border post in Sloten, 5 June 2006.

== Notable people ==
- Andreas Peter Cornelius Sol

== Gallery ==
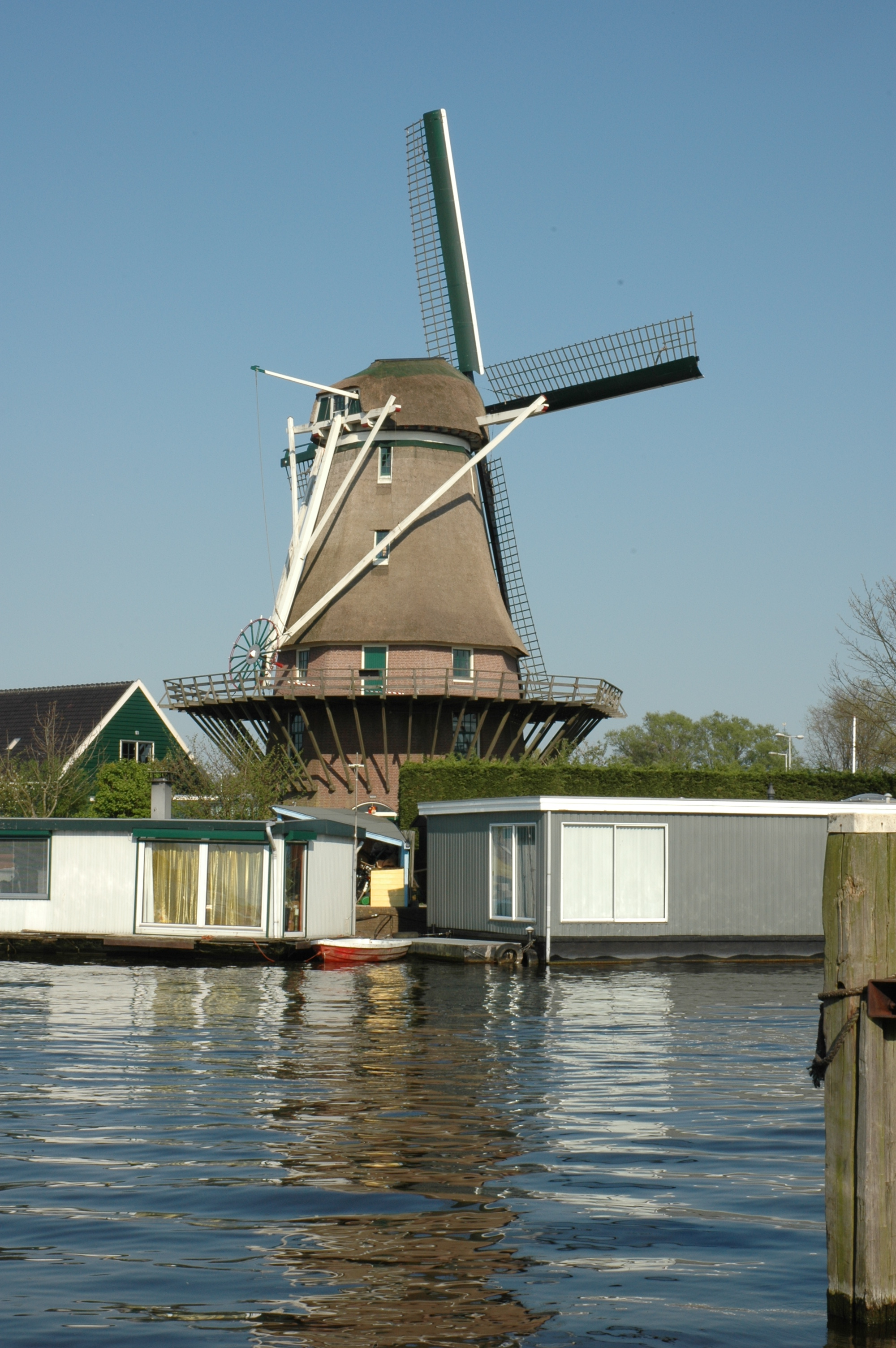
Windmill in Sloten viewed from the south

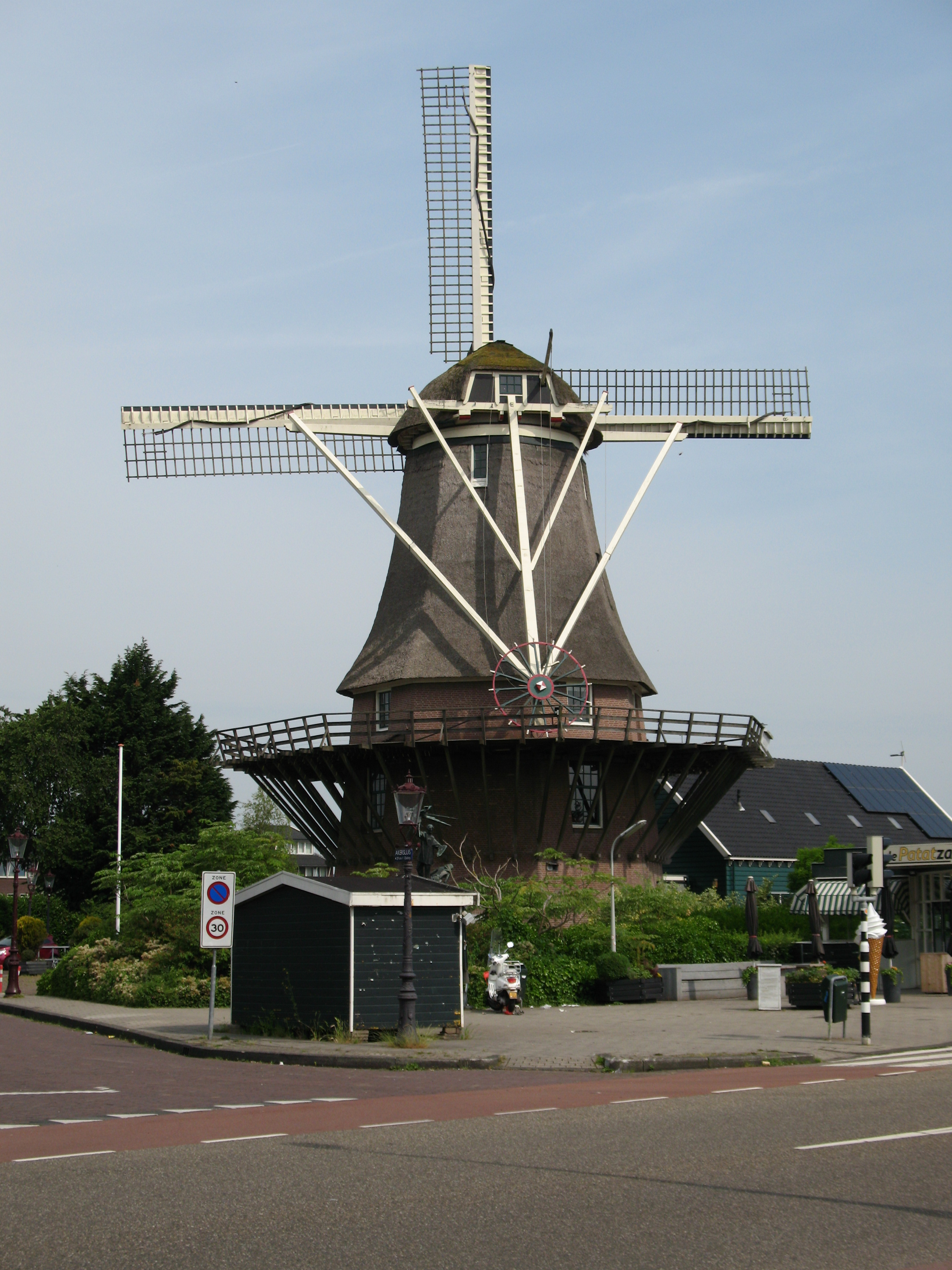
Windmill in Sloten viewed from the east

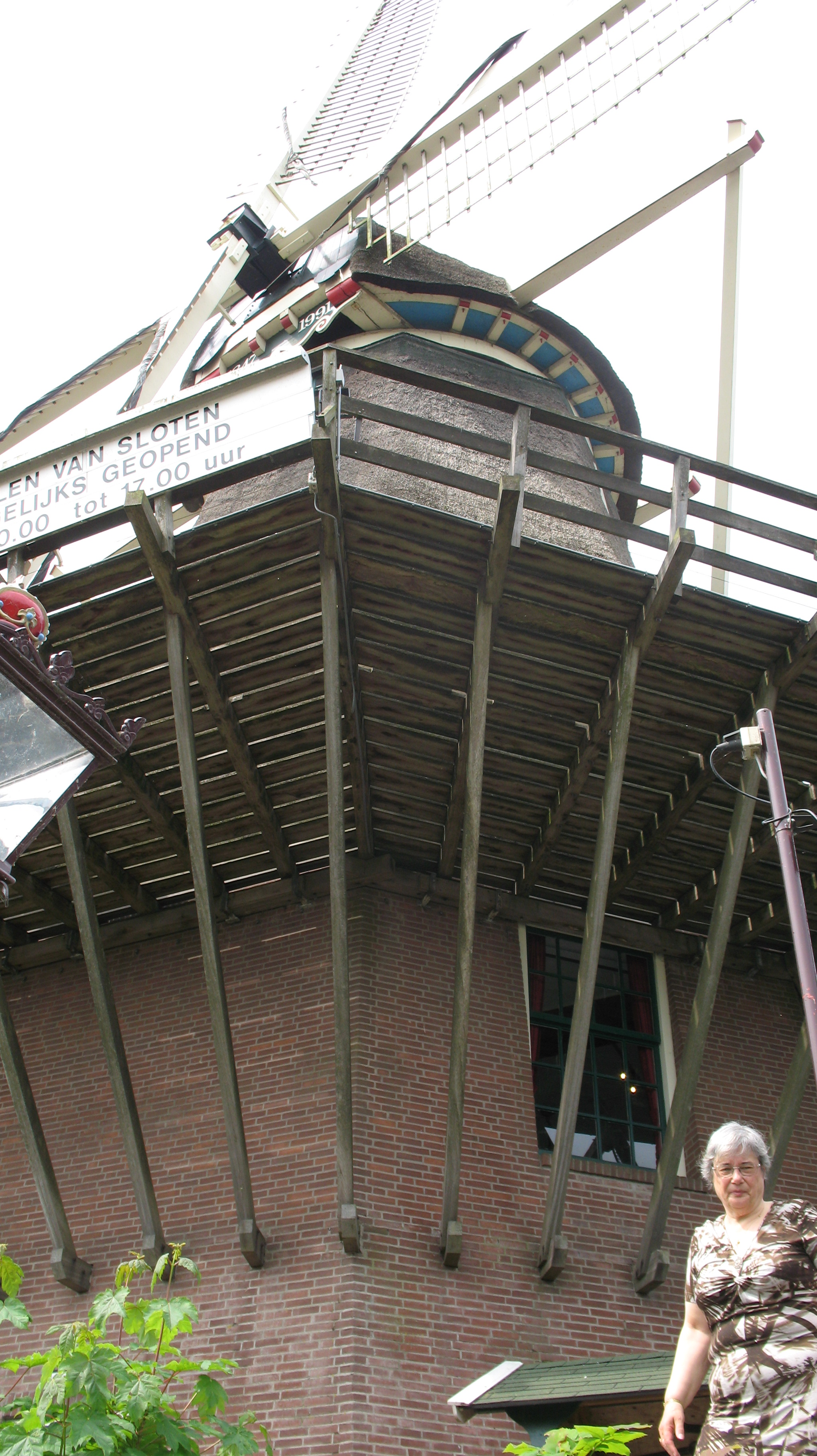
Close-up of the windmill platform

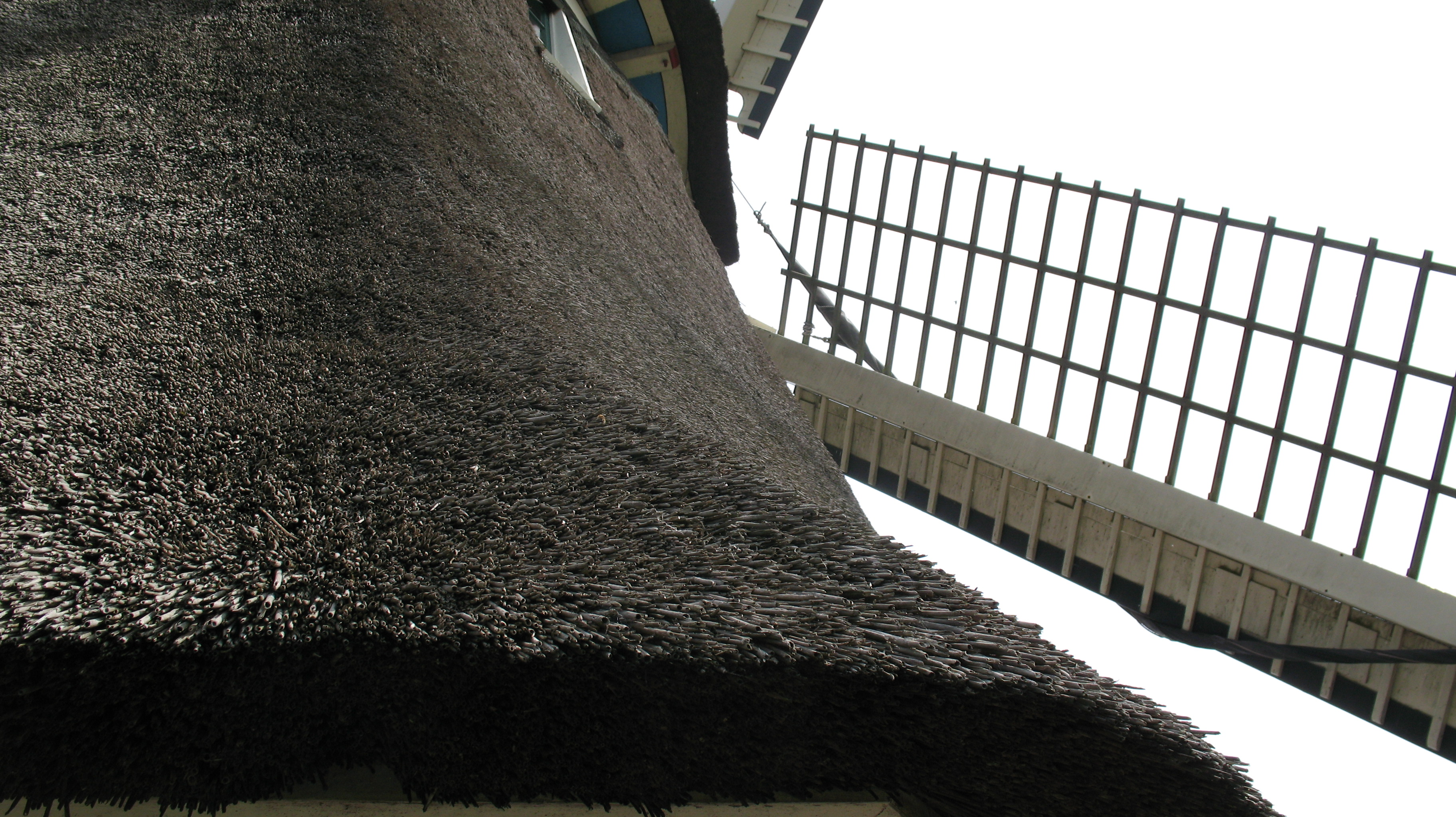
Close-up of the windmill wall

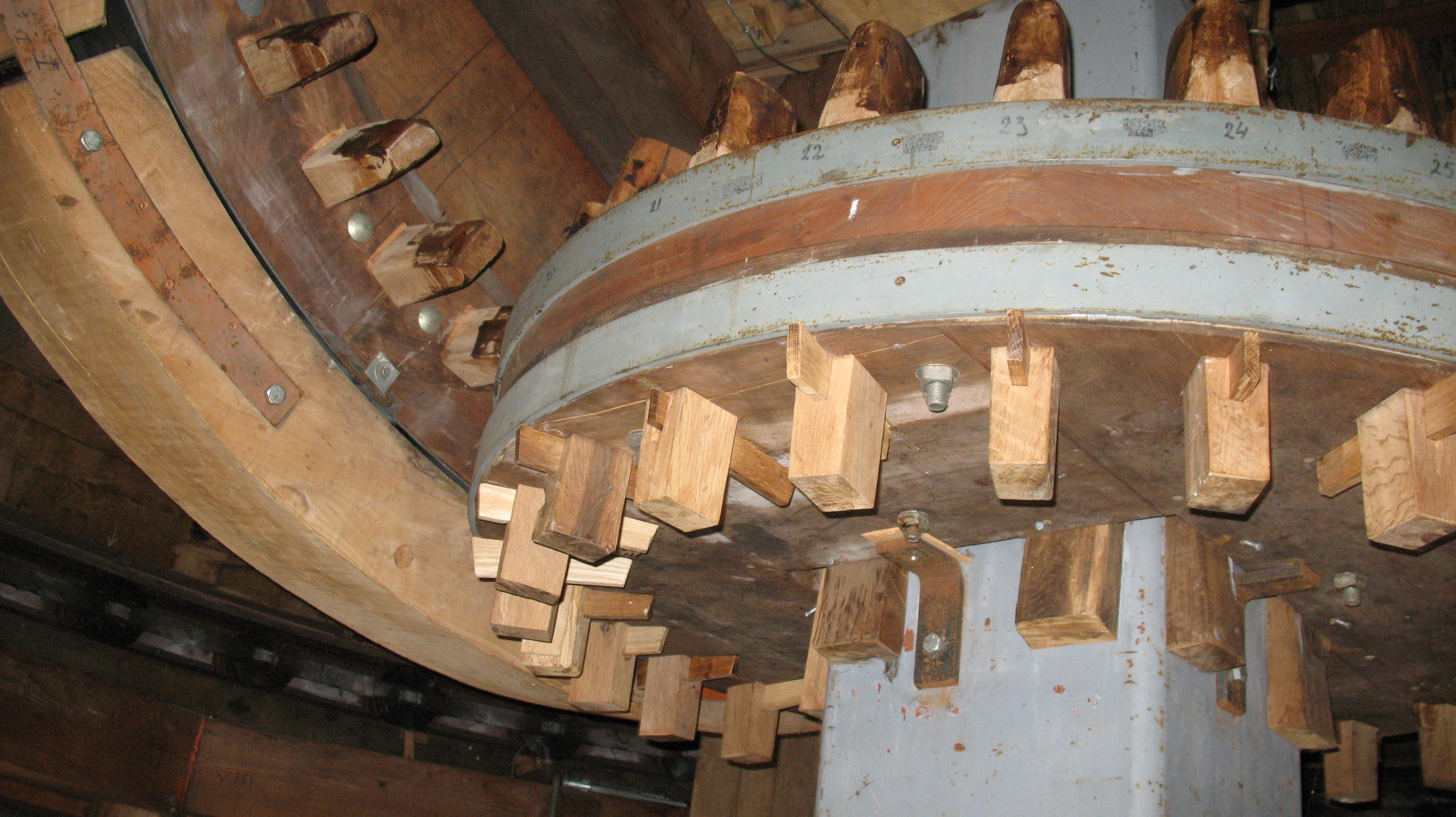
Close-up of the wooden gear mechanism

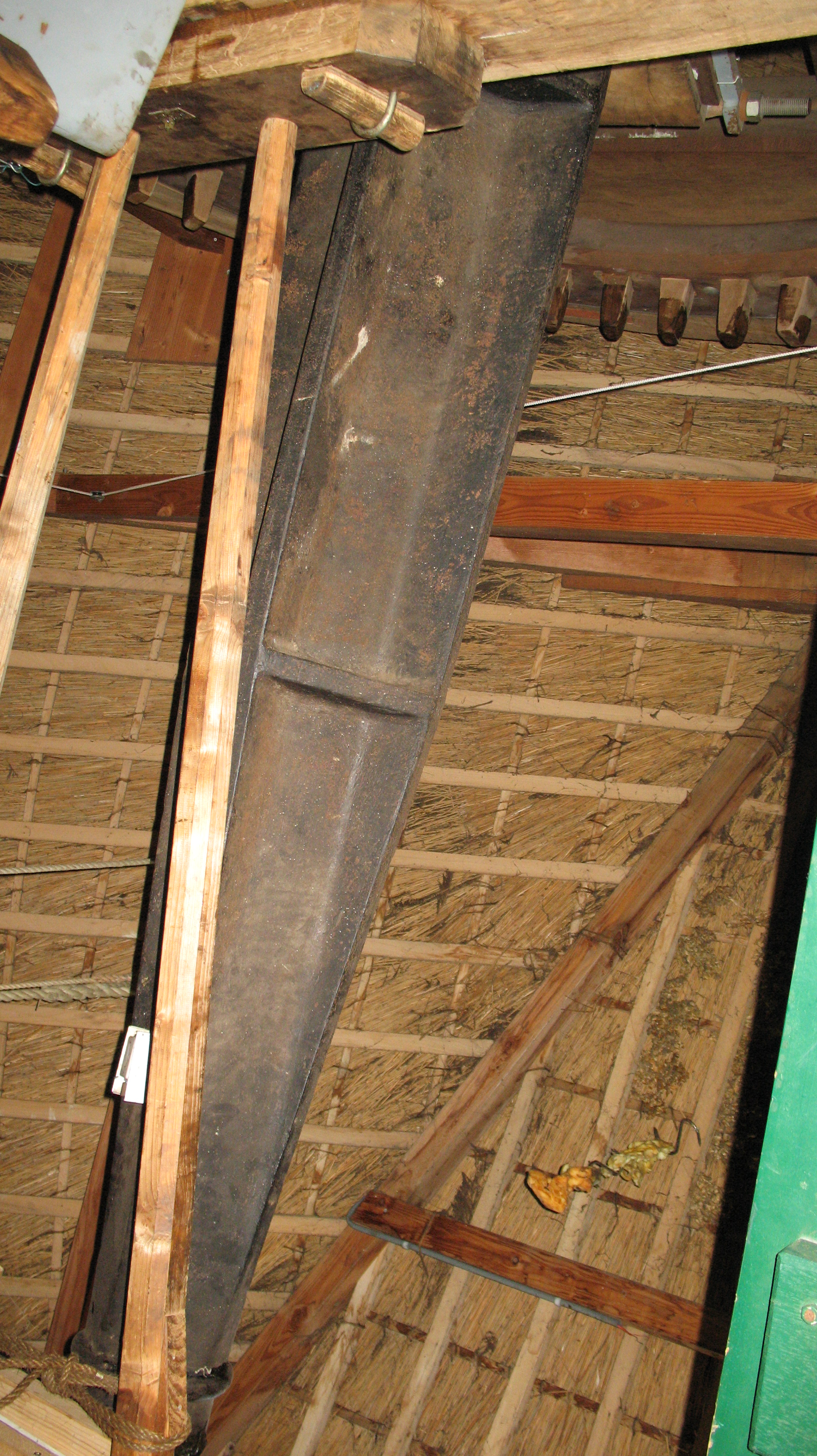
Inside view of windmill walls

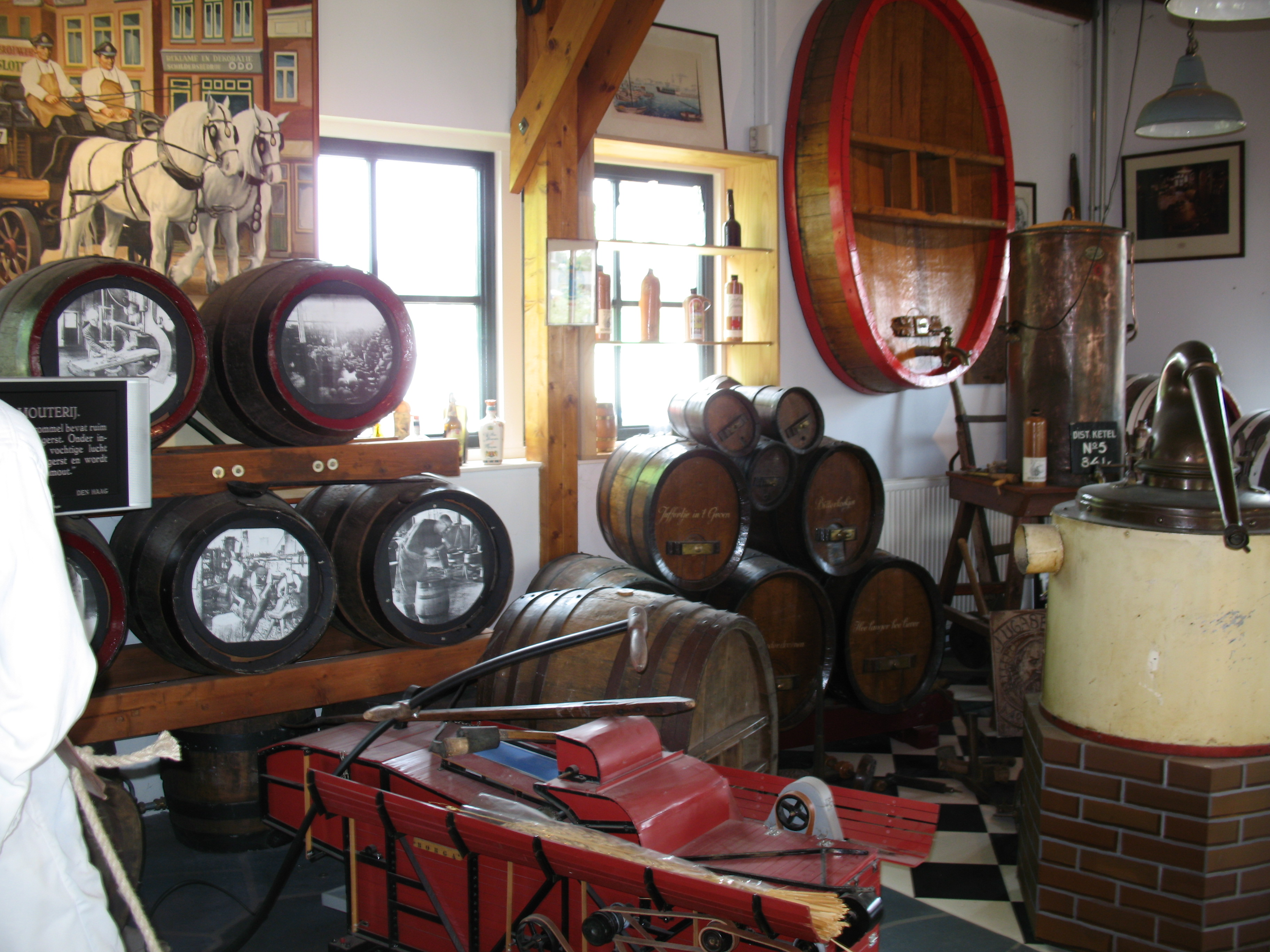
Exposition of the Rembrandt Sloten Windmill/Coopery Museum

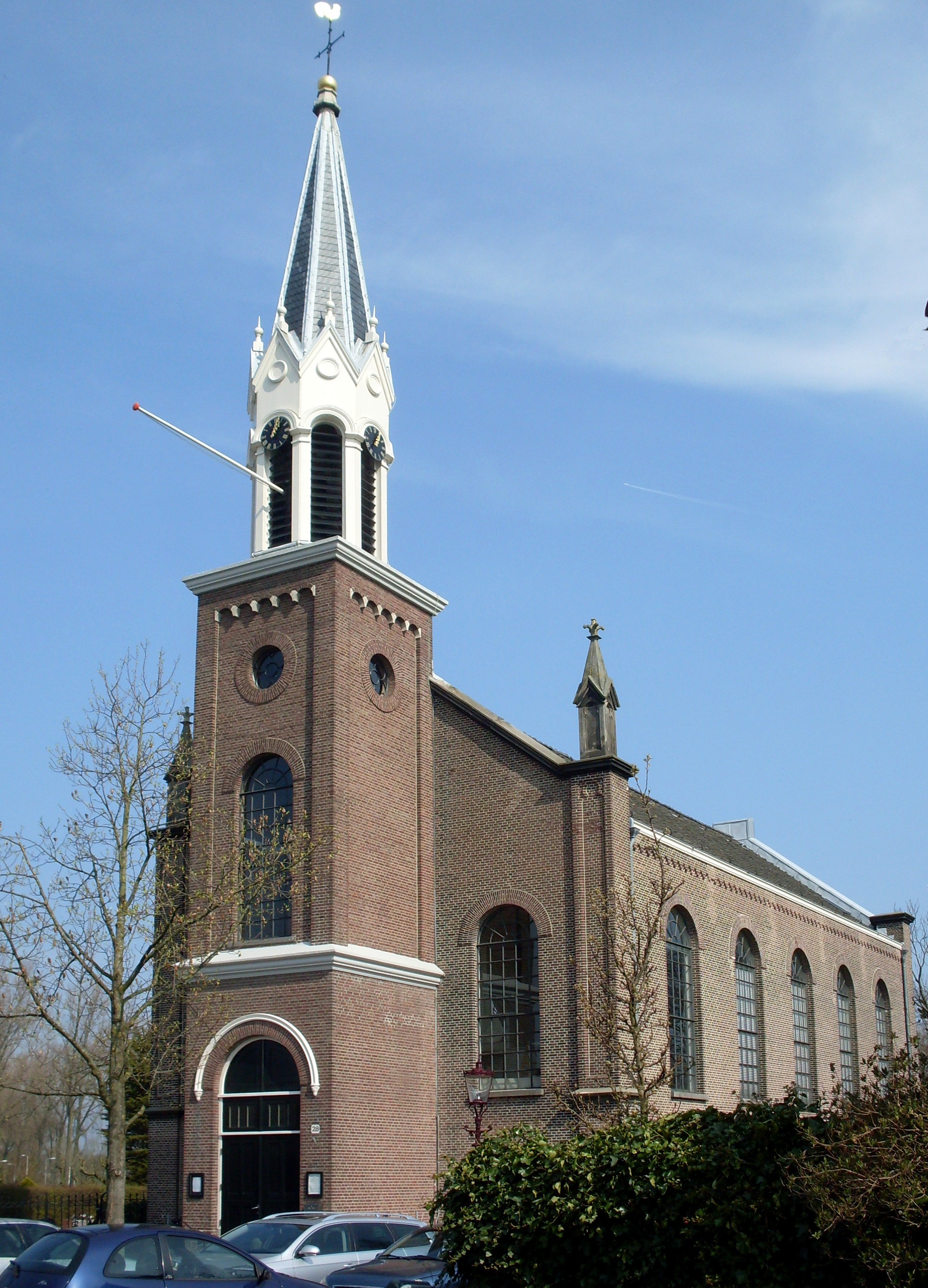
Sloterkerk in Sloten

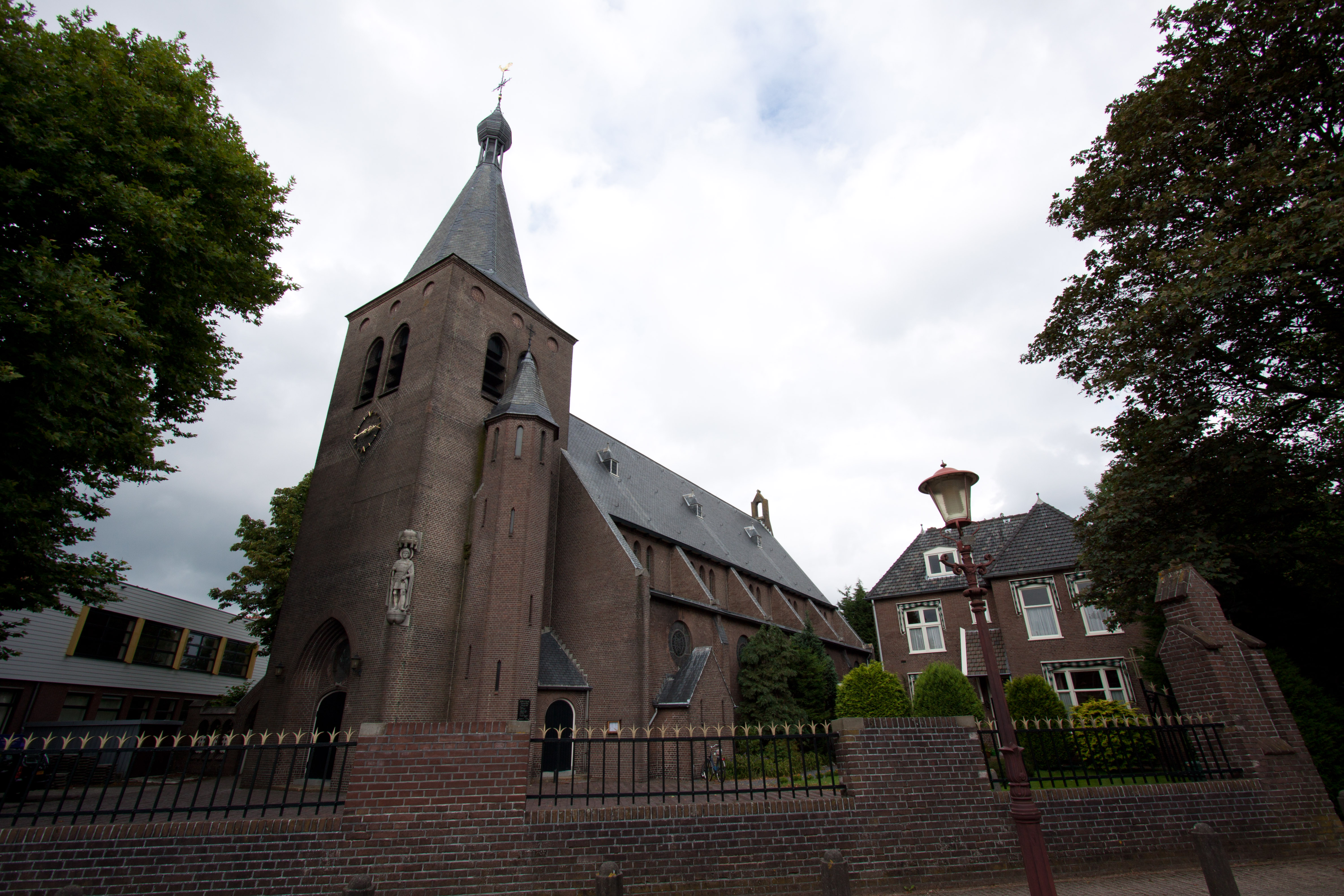
Sint Pancratiuskerk in Sloten
