= Slotervaart (neighbourhood) =

Coordinates: 52°21′N 4°50′E

Slotervaart Tuinstad Slotervaart
- Neighborhood of Amsterdam
- Slotervaart as part of Amsterdam
- Country: Netherlands
- Province: North Holland
- Municipality: Amsterdam
- Borough: Nieuw-West
- Time zone: UTC+1 (CET)
- Postal code: 1065
- Area code: 020

Slotervaart (short for Tuinstad Slotervaart) is a neighborhood in the far western part of Amsterdam, Netherlands. The area is named after the canal Slotervaart; the first houses were built in 1955.

Just outside the residential area there is a hospital, the Slotervaartziekenhuis (since 1976), and the Netherlands Cancer Institute (NKI) (since 1979).

Since 1990 Slotervaart was a part of the urban district of Slotervaart-Overtoomse Veld, which was renamed in 2004 as shortly Slotervaart. In 2010 however this borough was merged with surrounding boroughs into the larger borough Amsterdam Nieuw-West.

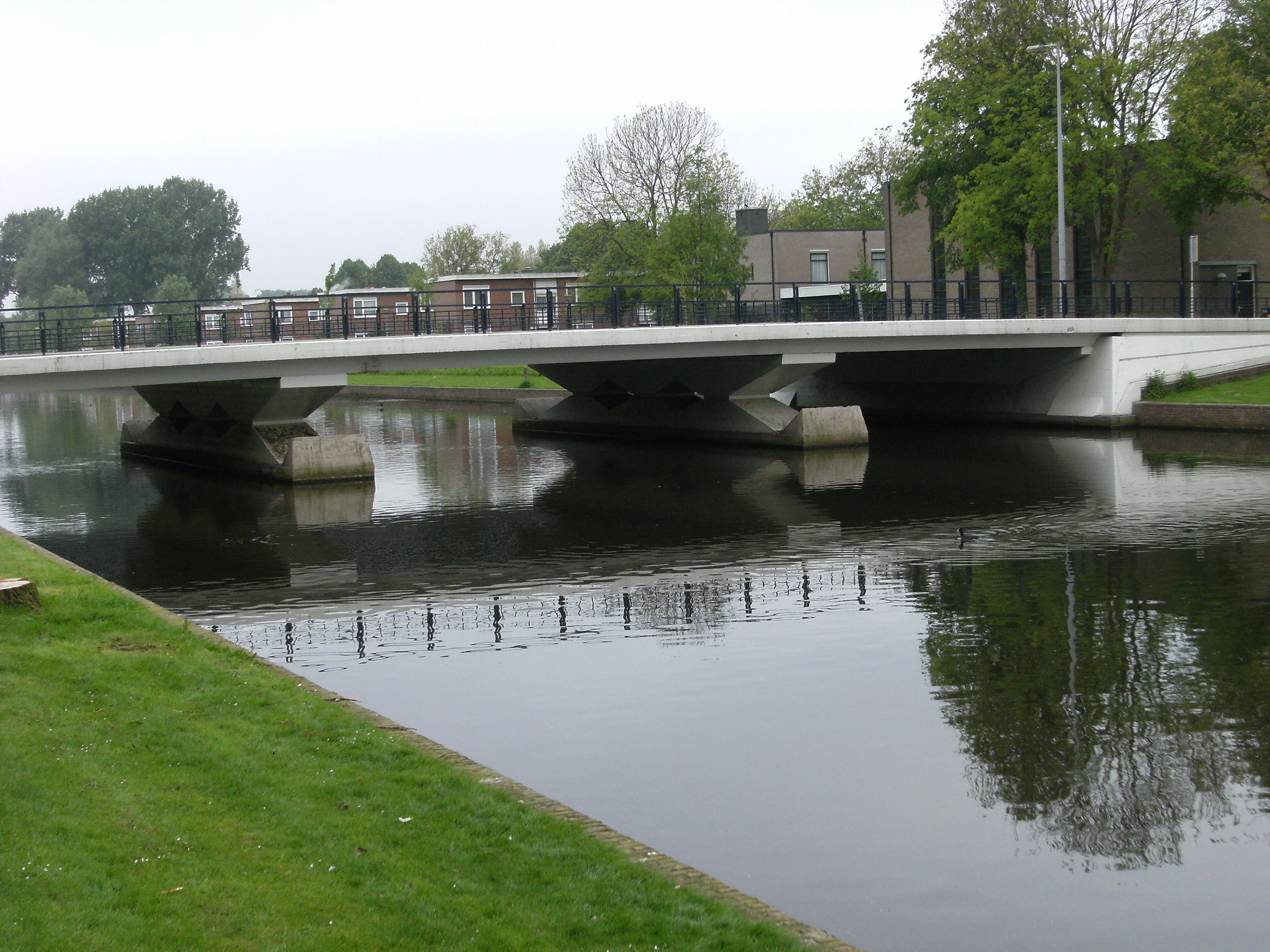
Bridge over Slotervaart canal

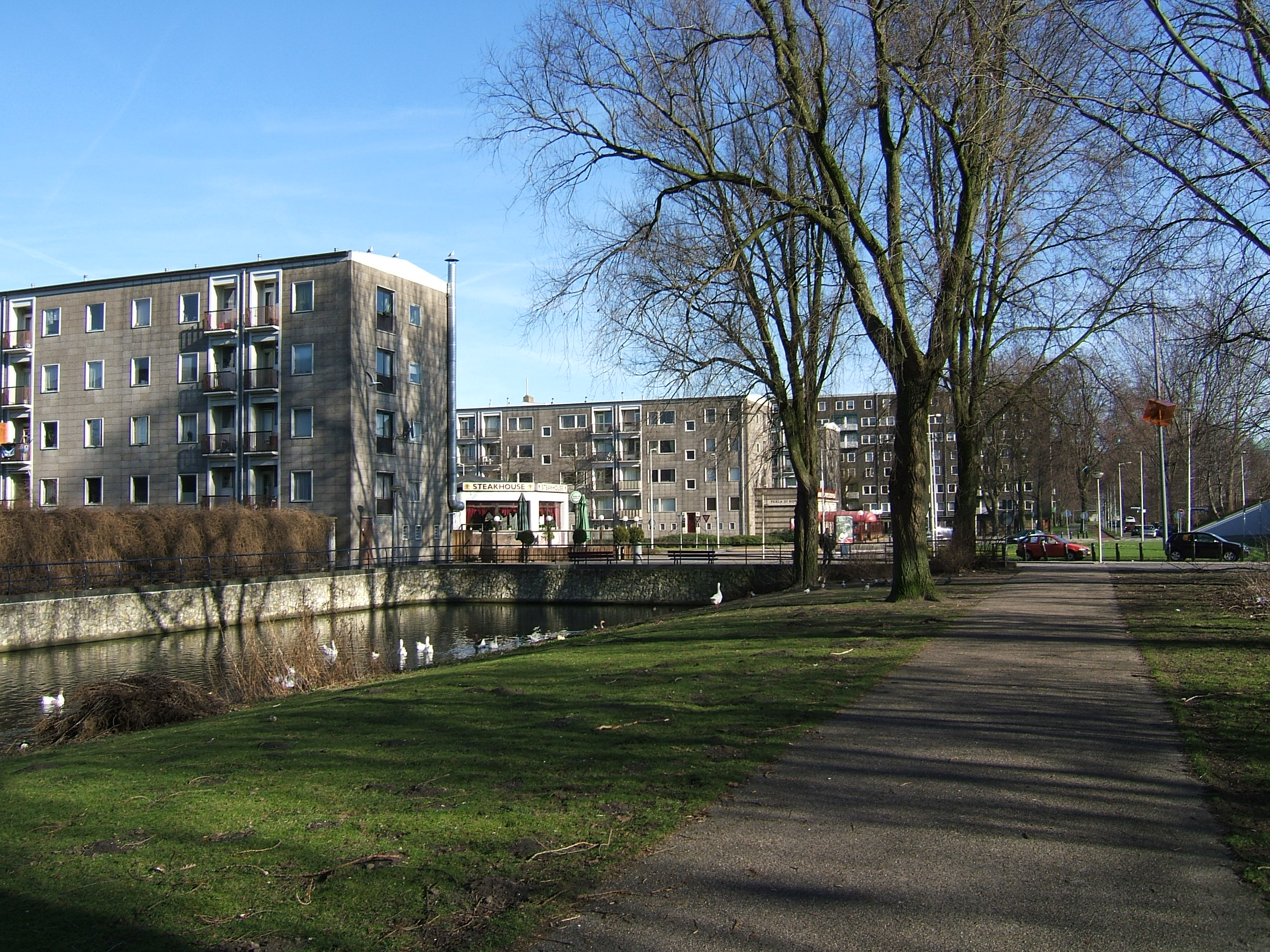
Apartment blocks Sloterhof

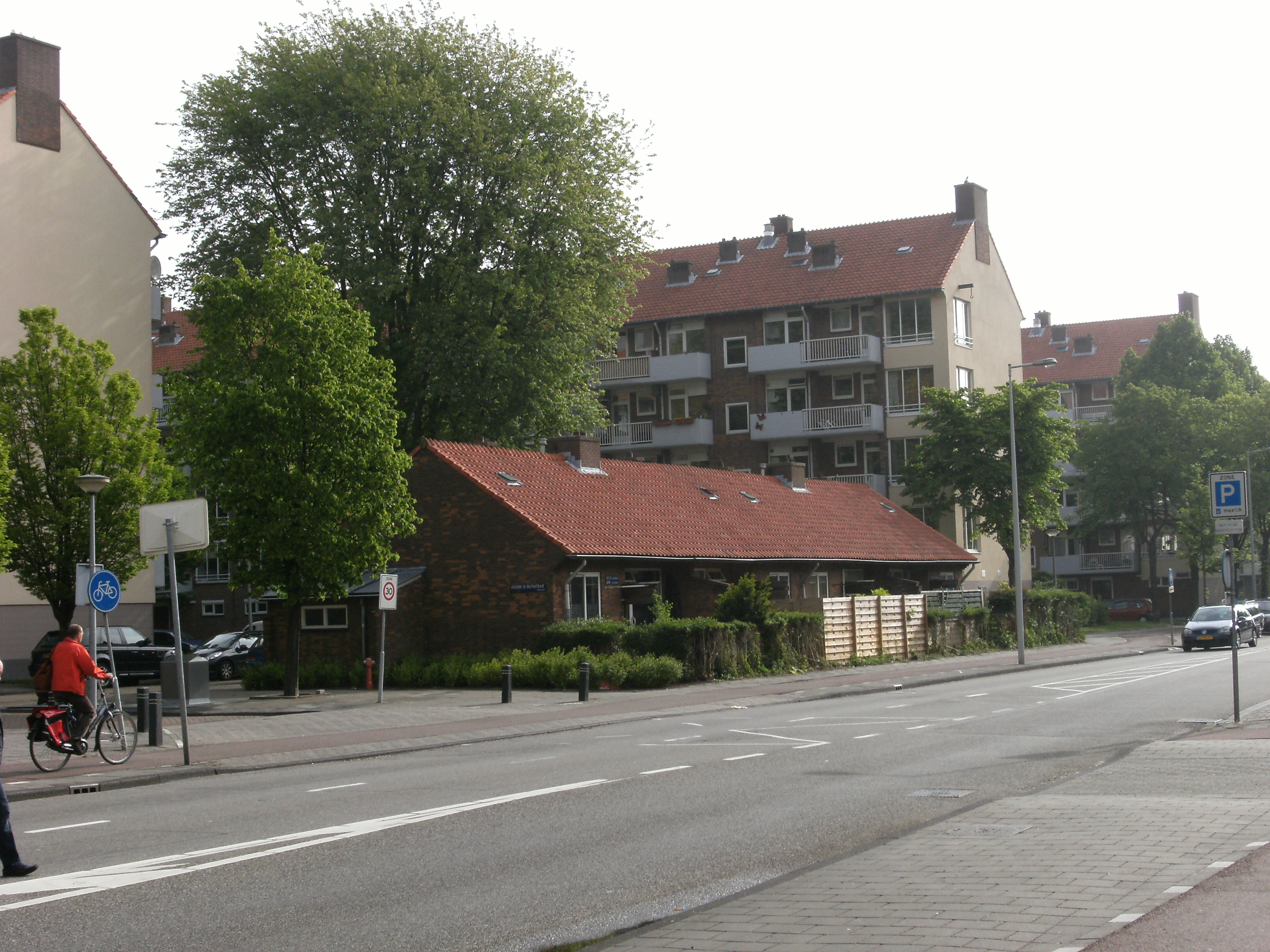
Apartment blocks, Pieter Calandlaan

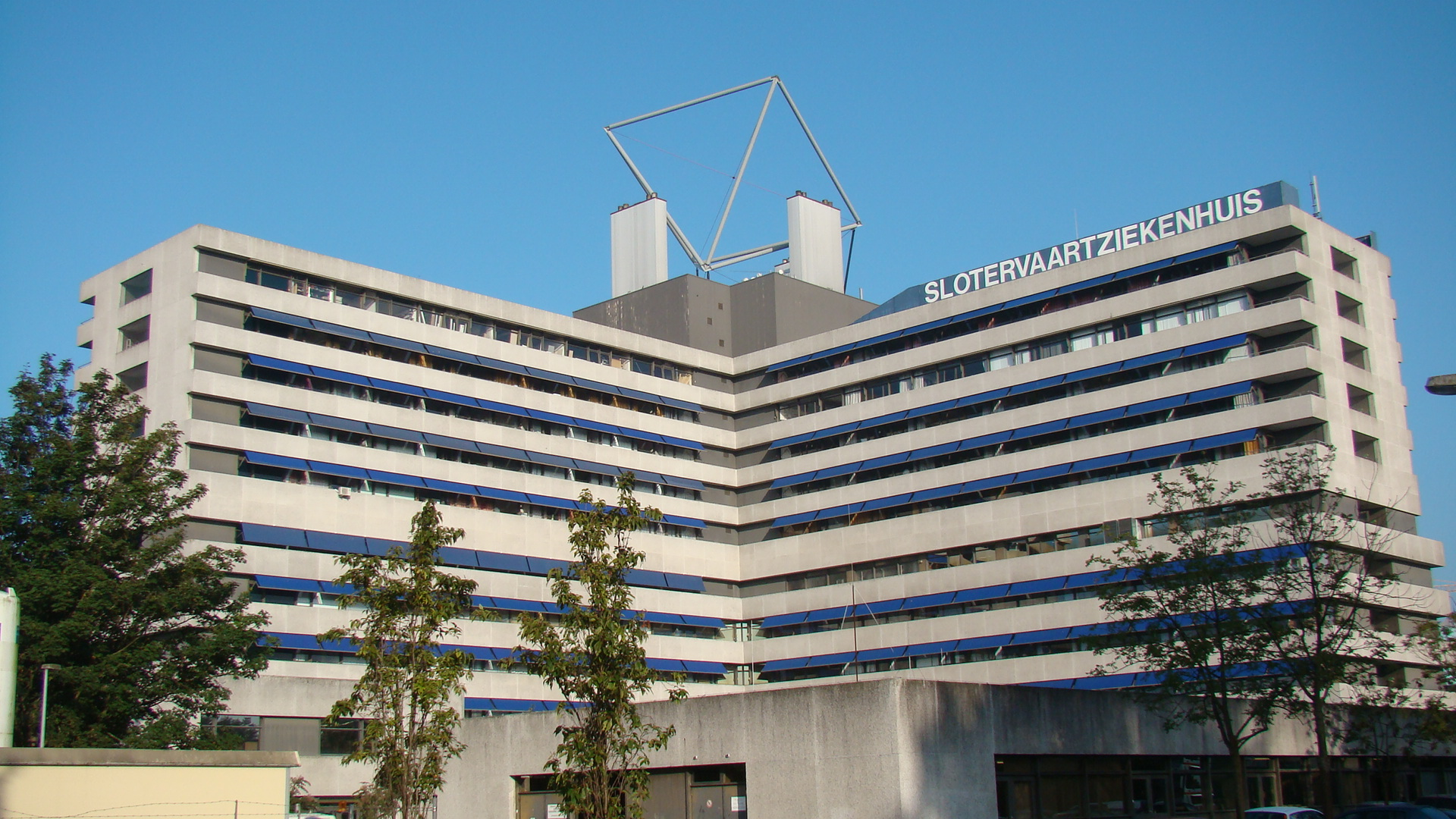
Slotervaartziekenhuis
