= Middelveldsche Akerpolder =

- Neighborhood of Amsterdam
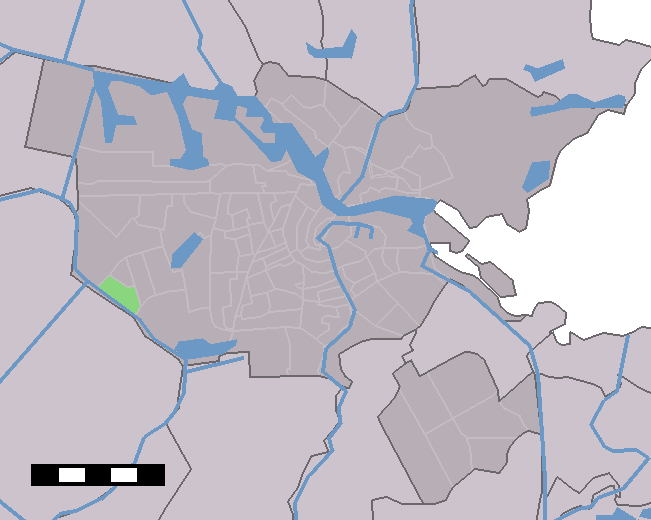
- Country: Netherlands
- Province: North Holland
- COROP: Amsterdam
- Time zone: UTC+1 (CET)

Middelveldsche Akerpolder is a neighborhood of Amsterdam, Netherlands, located in the urban district of Nieuw-West.
