= Slotervaart (former borough) =

Former district of Amsterdam, Netherlands

Coordinates: 52°21′N 4°50′E

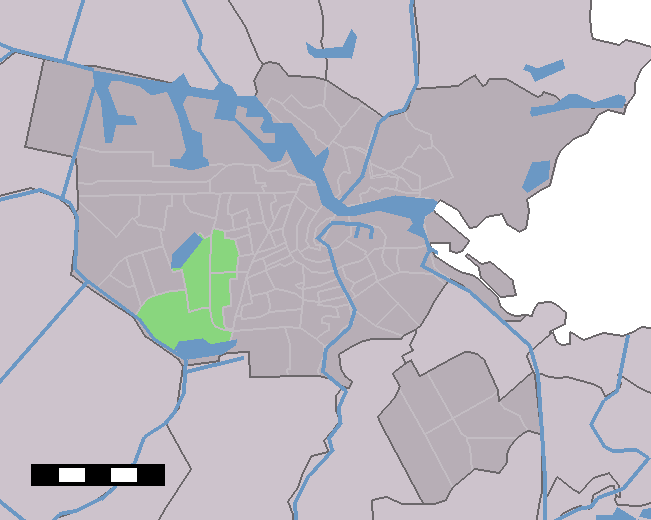
Map of Amsterdam where Slotervaart is green

Slotervaart was a district of Amsterdam, Netherlands between 1990 and 2010. It had a population of 48,540 inhabitants in 2008 and an area of 11.14 km^{2}. As of 2010, Slotervaart is part of the newly formed stadsdeel Nieuw-West.

Areas that were part of the borough included the smaller neighborhood of Slotervaart, Overtoomse Veld, and Nieuw Sloten.
