= Oostoever =

Coordinates: 52°21′58.65″N 4°49′49.32″E

- Neighborhood
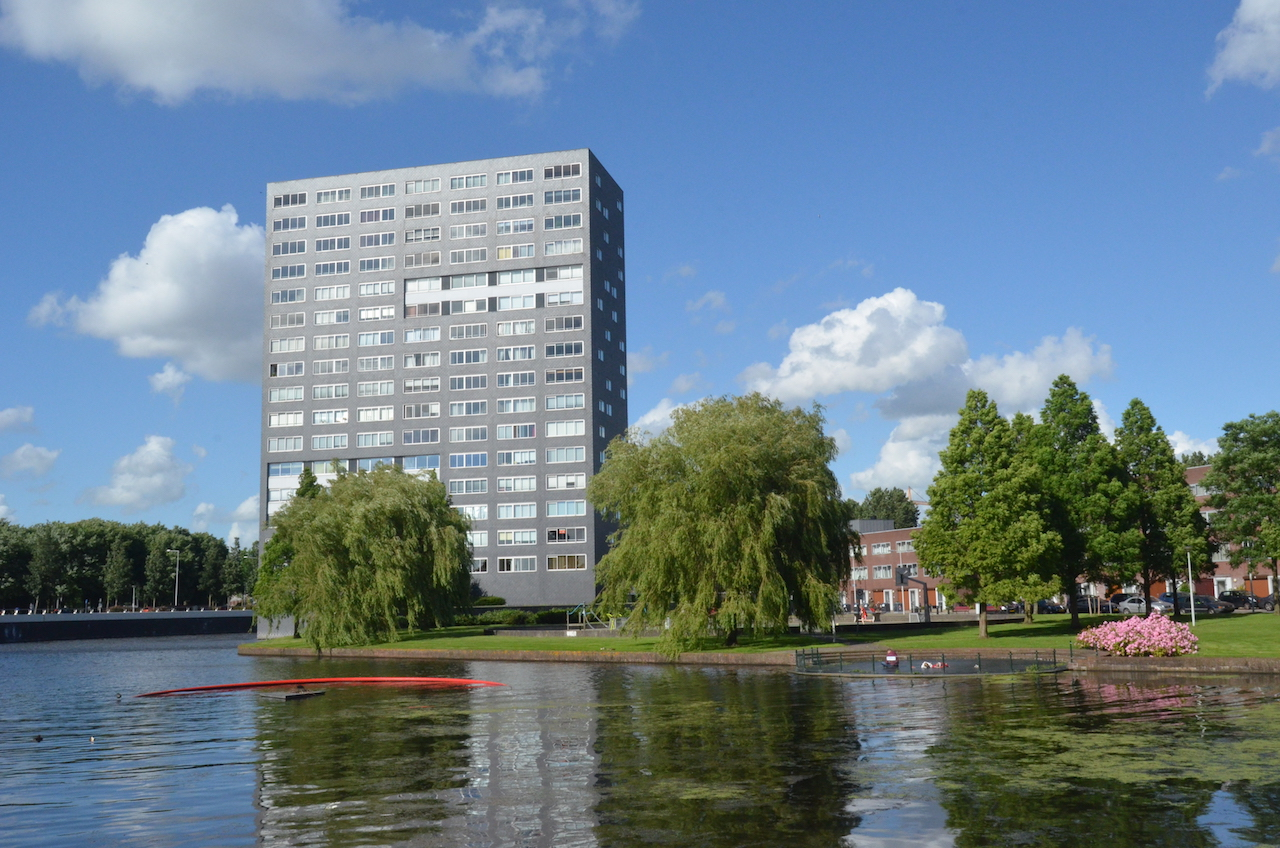
- Residential building 'Finisterre'.
- Interactive map of Oostoever
- Country: Netherlands
- Province: North Holland
- COROP: Amsterdam
- Time zone: UTC+1 (CET)

Oostoever is a neighborhood of Amsterdam, Netherlands.

== Street names ==
The streets in the neighborhood are named after the following museums (though mostly Dutch, some are in other countries):

Van Abbemuseum (Eindhoven); Alhambra (Granada); Museum van Bommel van Dam (Venlo); Bonnefantenmuseum (Maastricht); Museum Boijmans Van Beuningen (Rotterdam); Escorial (near Madrid); Guggenheim Museum (New York City); Hermitage (Saint Petersburg); Versailles (near Paris); Kröller-Müller Museum (Otterlo); De Lakenhal (Leiden); Louvre (Paris)	Mezquita (Córdoba); Parthenon (Athens); Prado Museum (Madrid); Rietveld Schröder House (Utrecht); Museum De Schotse Huizen (Veere); Simon van Gijnmuseum (Dordrecht); Singer Museum (Laren); Teylers Museum (Haarlem); Topkapi (Istanbul); Trianon (part of Versailles); Tretyakov Gallery (Moscow); Uffizi (Florence)
