= Nieuw Sloten =

Coordinates: 52°20′47″N 4°48′45″E

- Neighborhood of Amsterdam
- Interactive map of Nieuw Sloten
- Country: Netherlands
- Province: North Holland
- COROP: Amsterdam
- Borough: Amsterdam Nieuw-West

Area
  - Total: 2.29 sq mi (5.94 km^{2})
  - Land: 1.80 sq mi (4.66 km^{2})

Population (2024)
  - Total: 14,360
- Time zone: UTC+1 (CET)

Nieuw Sloten is a neighborhood of Amsterdam, Netherlands.

== History ==
In 1986, horticulture relocated from the area around the old village of Sloten to the Flevopolder and the Noordoostpolder, in order to make room for the Olympic village for the 1992 Summer Olympics. The Olympic village was never built because Amsterdam lost the bid to host the 1992 games to Barcelona. Instead, a new residential area was built. In the original plan, Nieuw Sloten was going to replace the old village of Sloten, but local pressure groups succeeded in preserving the old village and a small part of the former polders. By 2024, the neighborhood that comprises the old village of Sloten and the residential area of Nieuw Sloten was home to 14,326 inhabitants.
