= Oud Osdorp =

- Neighborhood of Amsterdam
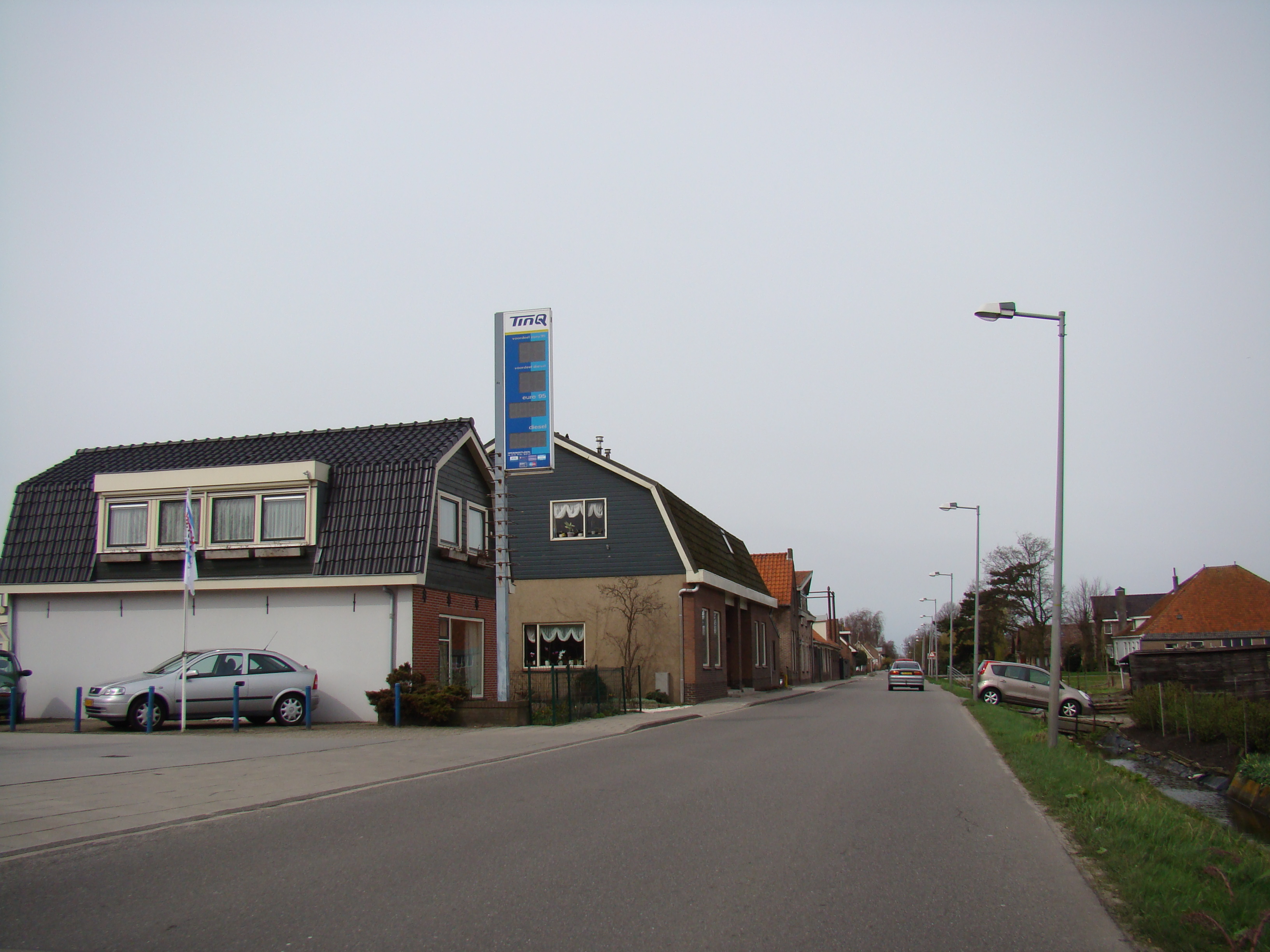
- Interactive map of Oud Osdorp
- Country: Netherlands
- Province: North Holland
- COROP: Amsterdam
- Time zone: UTC+1 (CET)

Oud Osdorp is a neighborhood of Amsterdam, Netherlands.
