= De Aker =

Coordinates: 52°21′05″N 4°46′45″E

- Neighborhood of Amsterdam
- Interactive map of De Aker
- Country: Netherlands
- Province: North Holland
- COROP: Amsterdam
- Time zone: UTC+1 (CET)

De Aker (Dutch pronunciation: [də ˈʔaːkər]) is a neighborhood of Amsterdam, Netherlands.
