= De Eendracht, Amsterdam =

De Eendracht
- Neighborhood of Amsterdam
- Location within North Holland Location within Netherlands
- Coordinates: 52.380599°N 4.790812°E
- Country: Netherlands
- Province: North Holland
- COROP: Amsterdam
- Time zone: UTC+1 (CET)

De Eendracht (Dutch pronunciation: [də ˈʔeːndrɑxt]) is a neighborhood of Amsterdam, Netherlands.
