= Westelijke Tuinsteden =

Coordinates: 52°22′17.82″N 4°49′16.61″E

- Neighborhood of Amsterdam
- Interactive map of Westelijke Tuinsteden
- Country: Netherlands
- Province: North Holland
- COROP: Amsterdam
- Time zone: UTC+1 (CET)

Westelijke Tuinsteden is a neighborhood of Amsterdam, Netherlands. It consists of six neighbourhoods with their own spatial and functional structure: Bos en Lommer, Slotermeer, Geuzenveld, Slotervaart, Overtoomseveld, and Osdorp. Since 2010, these districts, with the exception of Bos en Lommer, form part of the Nieuw-West borough.

These districts are grouped around the Sloterplas lake, which was dug to extract sand to build of the new garden cities. Sloterplas, with the surrounding Sloterpark, forms the heart of the western suburbs. The Nieuwe Meer was also excavated to a depth of approximately 30 metres to extract sand.
