= Geuzenveld =

Coordinates: 52°23′N 4°48′E

Geuzenveld (garden city)
- Neighborhood of Amsterdam
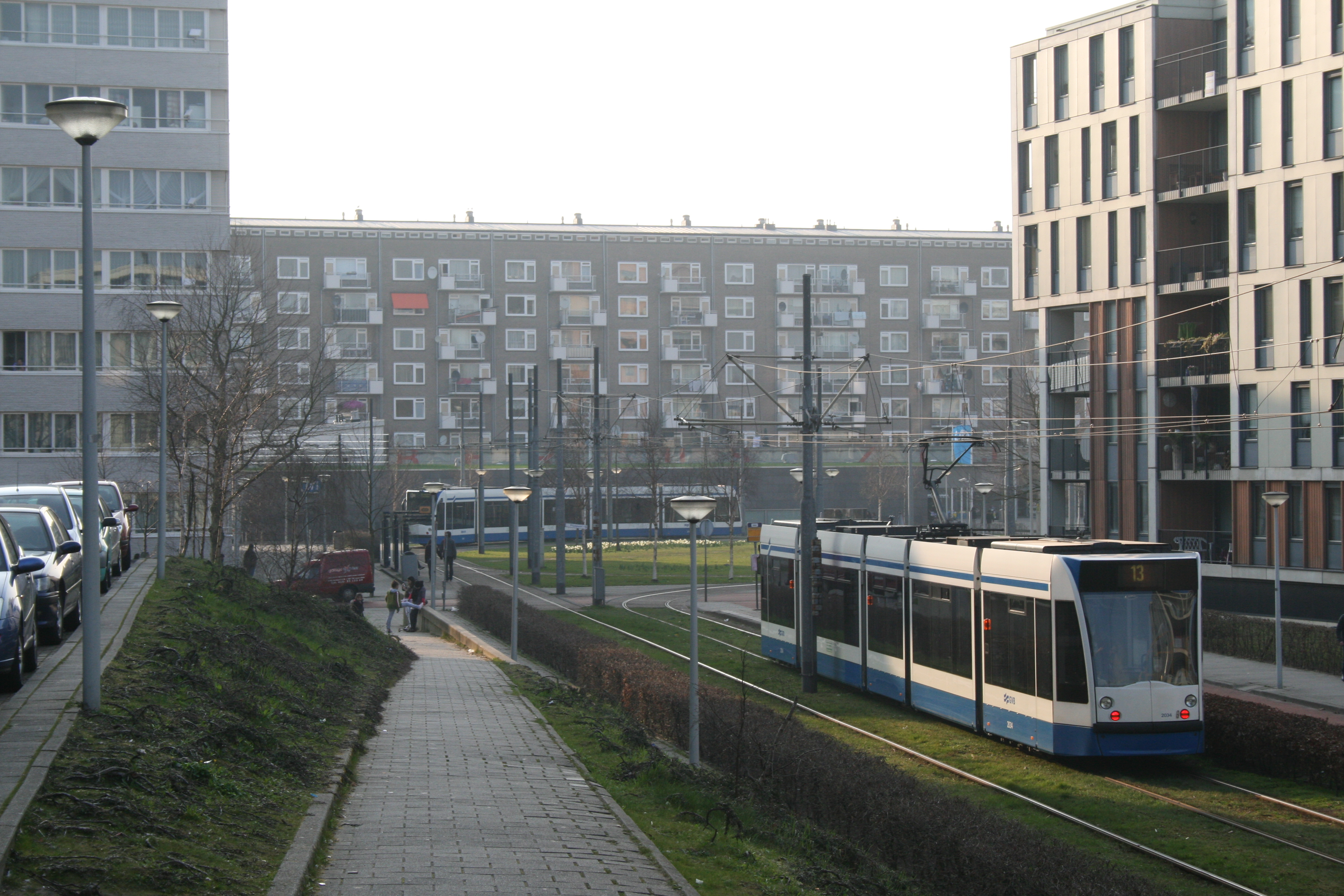
- Amsterdam tram at Geuzenveld terminus on route 13, March 2011.
- Interactive map of Geuzenveld (garden city)
- Country: Netherlands
- Province: North Holland
- COROP: Amsterdam
- Time zone: UTC+1 (CET)

Geuzenveld (Tuinstad Geuzenveld, garden city Geuzenveld) is a neighborhood of Amsterdam, Netherlands designed by architect Cornelis van Eesteren.
