= Urban districts of the Netherlands =

A stadsdeel (Dutch pronunciation: [ˈstɑtsdeːl]; pl. stadsdelen; lit. 'city part') is the name used for urban or municipality districts in some of the larger municipalities of the Netherlands.

Amsterdam calls 7 of its 8 deelgemeenten stadsdeel. They form a level of government, both executive (stadsdeelwethouders) and legislative (Stadsdeelraad, a council elected by the inhabitants), and can therefore be regarded as boroughs or wards. Until 2010, Amsterdam had 15 deelgemeenten, but the number has been decreased to eight.

Eindhoven's stadsdelen correspond to the former municipalities that fused into that of Eindhoven in 1920; their use to subdivide Eindhoven is standard on traffic signs and in official documents and publications, but they have no political or administrative independence.

== See also ==
- Gemeente
- Deelgemeente
- Boroughs of Amsterdam
- Boroughs of Rotterdam
- Districts of The Hague
