= Hin =

Hin or HIN may refer to:

== People ==
- Cornelis Hin (1867–1944), A Dutch Olympic sailor
- Frans Hin (1906–1968), A Dutch Olympic sailor
- Johan Hin (1899–1957), A Dutch Olympic sailor

== Science and technology ==
- Hin recombinase, a protein
- Hin, an ancient Egyptian unit of volume; see hekat
- Hin, a Biblical and Talmudic unit of measurement

== Transportation ==
- High injury network
- Hindley railway station, in England
- Hinton station (West Virginia), an Amtrak station
- Sacheon Airport, in South Korea
- Hull number, or hull identification number

== Other uses ==
- hin, the ISO 639-2 and 639-3 code for the language Hindi
- Hot Import Nights, automobile shows
- HIN (Healthcare Identification Number), US identifier
- HIN (Holder Identification Number), a unique number that identifies a CHESS sponsored shareholder

== See also ==
- Hinn, a surname
