= Schellingwoude =

- Neighbourhood of Amsterdam
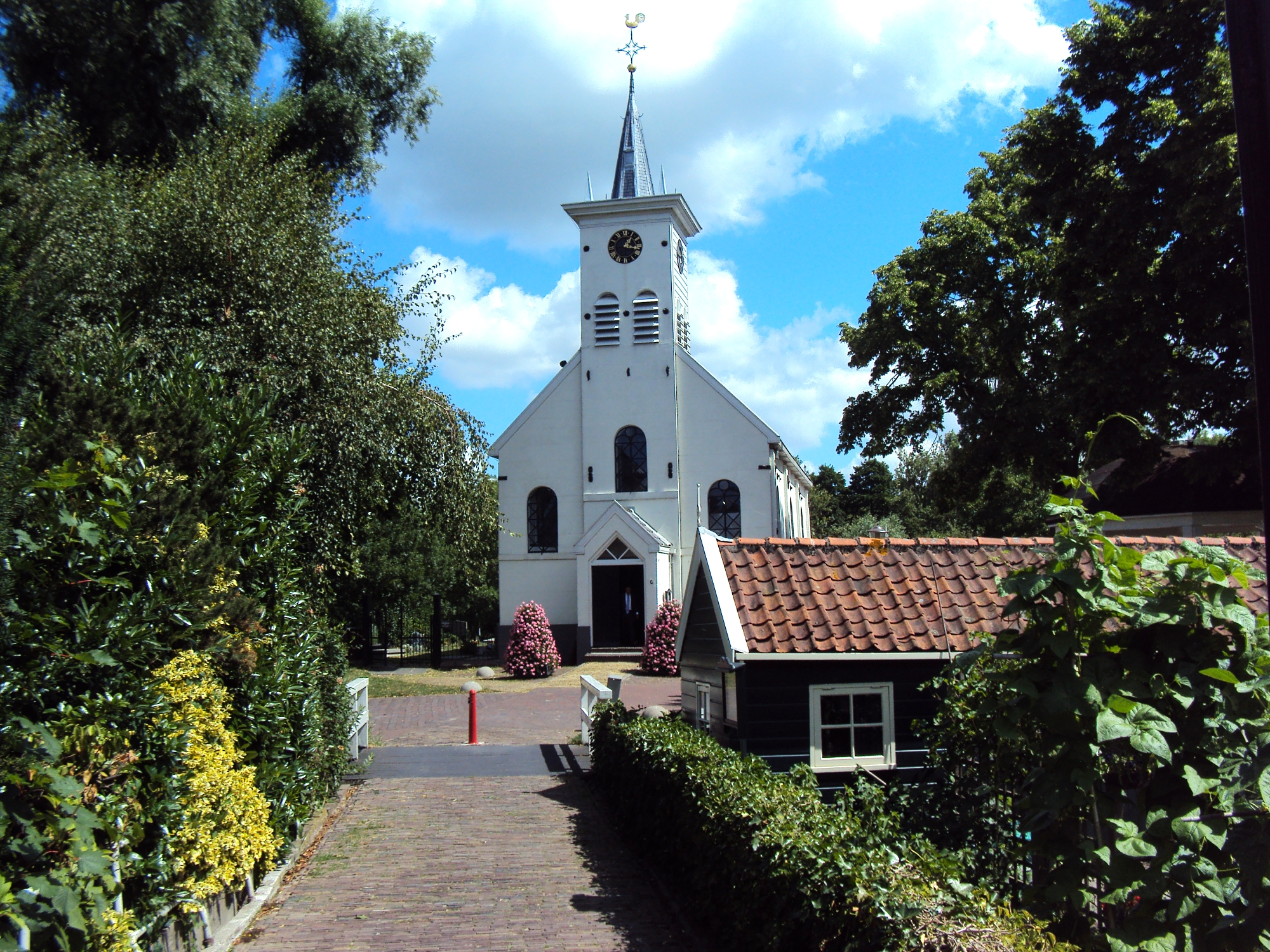
- Church of Schellingwoude

- Coat of arms
- Interactive map of Schellingwoude
- Coordinates: 52°23′4″N 4°57′58″E
- Country: Netherlands
- Province: North Holland
- Municipality: Amsterdam
- Borough: Noord

Schellingwoude is a neighbourhood of Amsterdam, Netherlands. A former village located on the northern shore of the IJ, in the province of North Holland, it was a separate municipality between 1817 and 1857, when it was merged with Ransdorp; the latter merged with Amsterdam in 1921. Nowadays it is part of the Amsterdam-Noord borough and the Landelijk Noord district.

== History ==
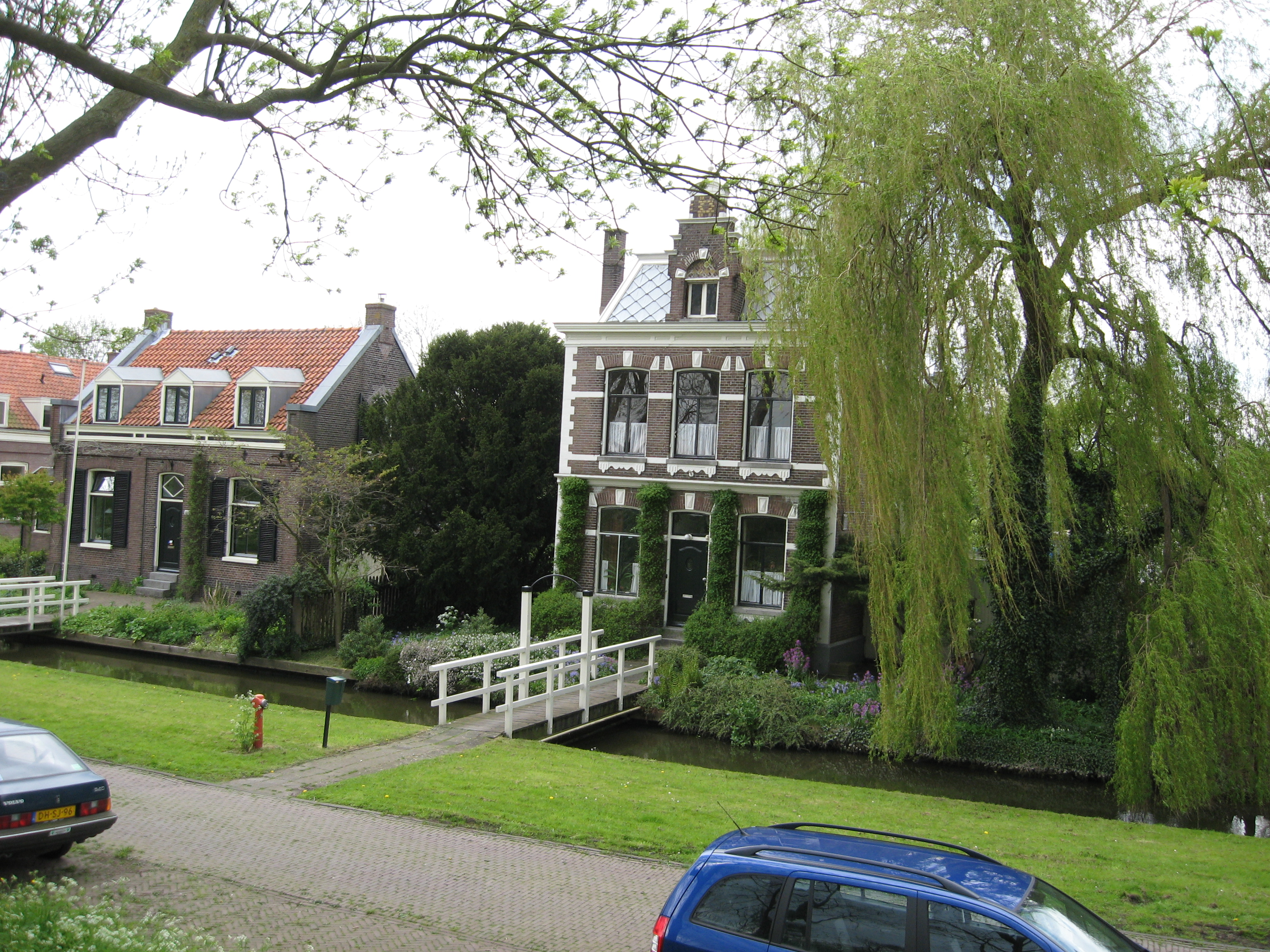
The village's historical centre

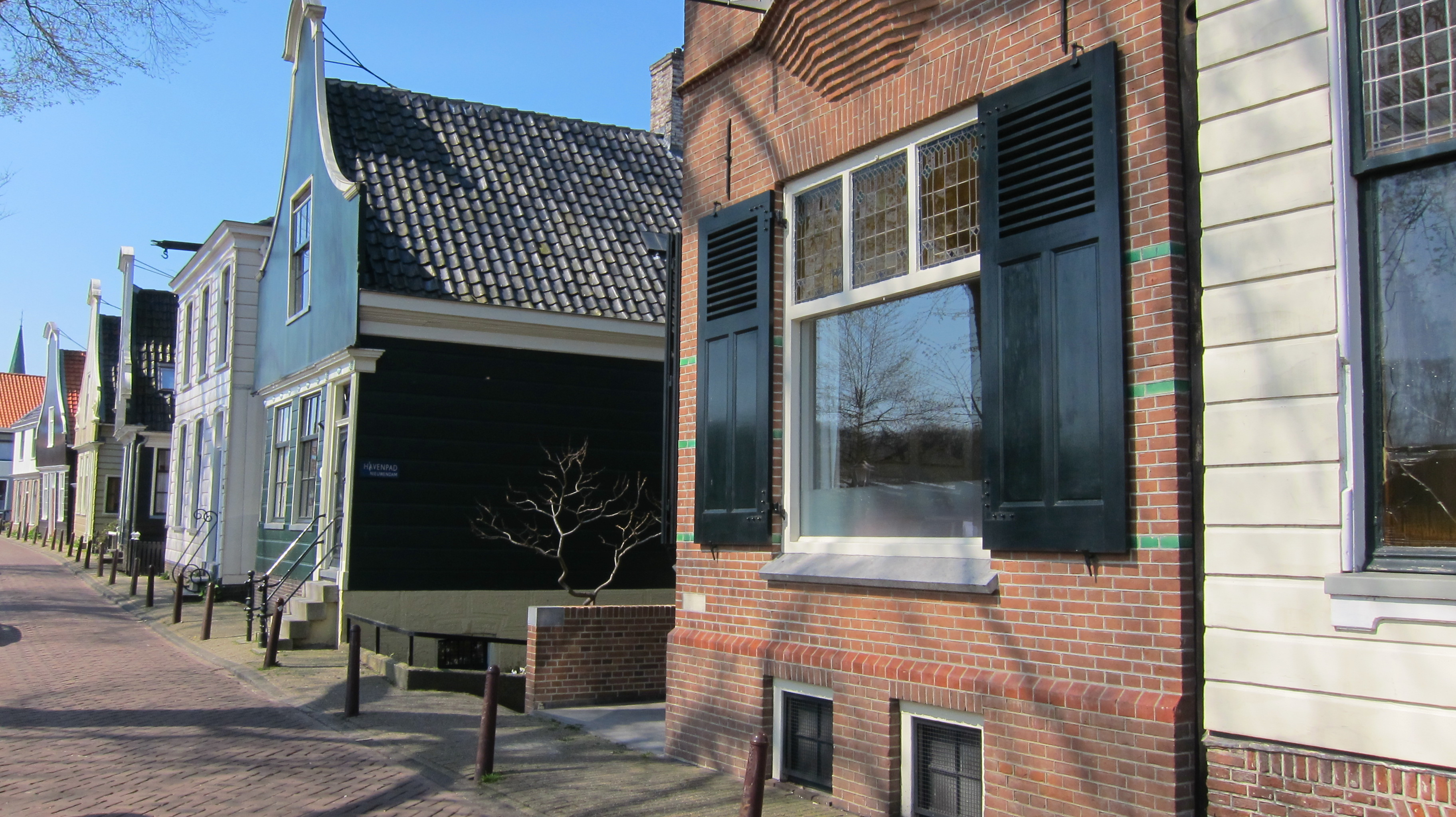
Schellingwouderdijk

In order to stop the land loss caused by the Zuiderzee, farmers began around 1200 to build the Waterlandse Zeedijk. On this dike, the village Schellingwoude was founded. Sources of income were farming and fishing. During the 14th century, trade began to flourish, and took on greater importance in the 16th century, owing to the growth in shipping in this part of Holland. Competition with Amsterdam was enormous, however, so commerce around shipping declined. In those days Schellingwoude was a village of distinction. For the surrounding villages, the administration of justice took place in Schellingwoude.

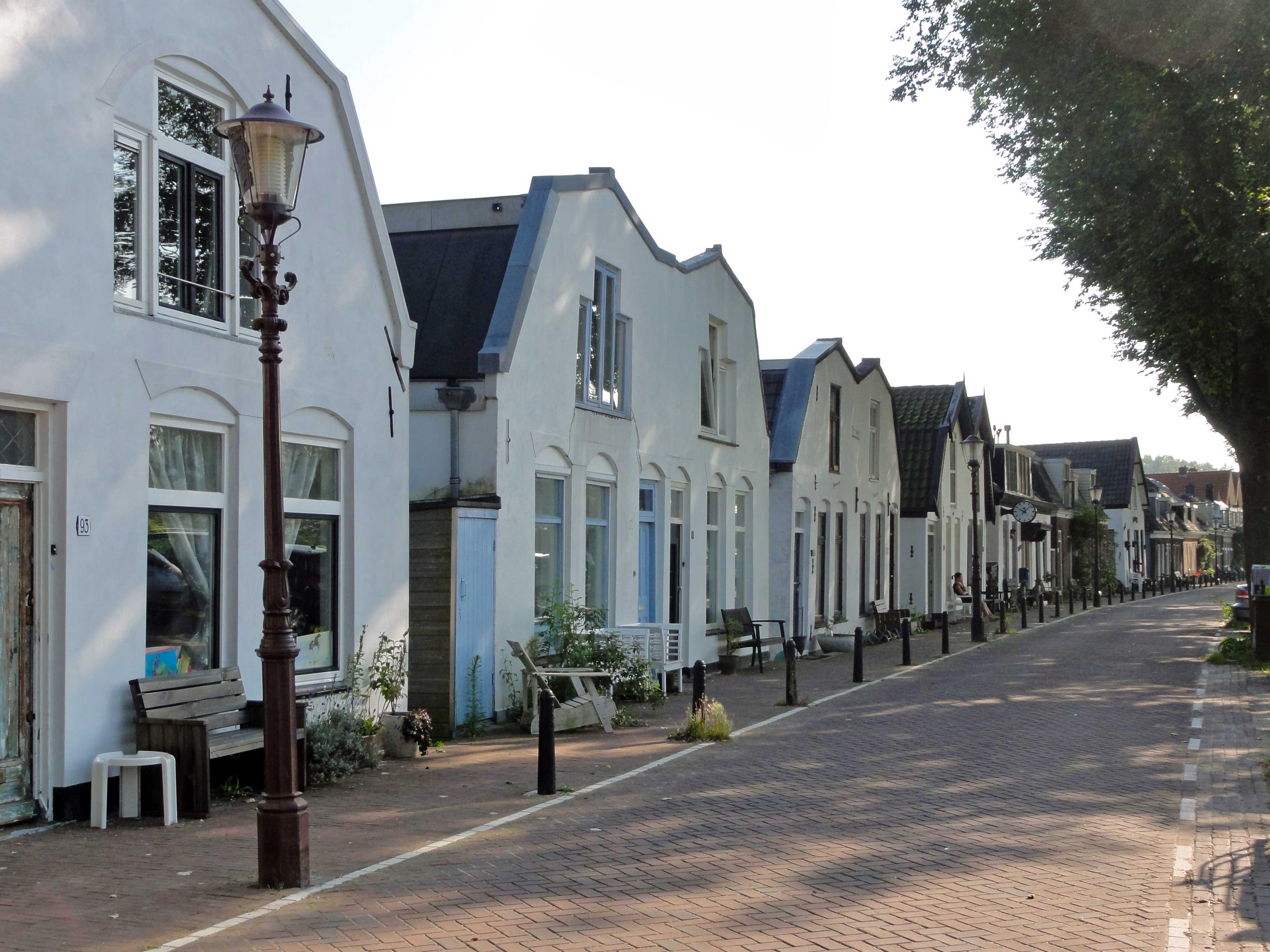
Eastern part of the neighbourhood

In 1622, the population of Schellingwoude was 1,048; by 1809 this number had fallen to 684. The decline in the trade and shipping activities was the main cause of this reduction. Activities that remained were farming, fishing and some industrial activity. In 1800, Schellingwoude had two mills. An important complex of locks, the Oranje Locks, together with a steam pumping station, was ready in 1872. King Willem III had laid the first stone on 29 April 1870. The Oranjesluizen and the Schellingwouder Bridge, built in 1957 over the Buiten-IJ, are two landmarks at the east side of the village.

With the arrival of the Oranjesluizen, Schellingwoude got a boost. The lock created new jobs and new houses were built. The village supported around five pubs at that time. The villages at the Waterlandse Zeedijk were extremely stricken by the flood of 1916 and could not recover on their own: in 1921, Amsterdam incorporated the villages Buiksloot, Nieuwendam (with Zunderdorp) and Ransdorp (with Schellingwoude, Durgerdam and Holysloot).

== Church ==
Since the 14th century, the village has a church. The Schellingwouder church was built on a terp behind the dyke. The current church is dated from 1866. The church chest from 1659 has survived; important documents were once kept in it.

The chest has a text engraved in memory of the people of Schellingwoude who stood up for their rights at that time. Other villages required Schellingwoude to pay more money for the upkeep of the Waterlandse Zeedijk. The resistance of Schellingwoude was successful.

Schellinghwoud heeft over vijftigh jaer gestreden
Tegen ses dorpen en twee steden
De gemeendijck versocht en van dat hof verkreghen
In 't jaer sestien hondert vijftigh en negen

Nowadays, the church does not serve as a house of worship, but remains a popular wedding location.
