= Sailing at the 1928 Summer Olympics – 12' Dinghy =

12' Dinghy at the Games of the IX Olympiad
- Line drawing of the 12' Dinghy
- Venue: Buiten Y
- Dates: First race: 2 August 1928; Last race: 8 August 1928
- Competitors: 23 Male from 20 nations
- Teams: 20

Medalists
| 1st place, gold medalist(s) | | Sven Thorell | Sweden |
| 2nd place, silver medalist(s) | | Henrik Robert | Norway |
| 3rd place, bronze medalist(s) | | Bertil Broman | Finland |

The 12' Dinghy was a sailing event on the Sailing at the 1928 Summer Olympics program in Amsterdam. A combination of Preliminary series and final series were scheduled. 23 sailors from 20 nations competed on twelve 12' Dinghies that were supplied by the Royal Dutch Yachting Union (Koninklijke Verbonden Nederlandsche Watersport Vereenigingen).

== Race schedule ==
| ● | Event competitions | ● | Event finals |

| Date | August | | | | | | |
| Date | 2nd Thu | 3rd Fri | 4th Sat | 5th Sun | 6th Mon | 7th Tue | 8th |
|---|---|---|---|---|---|---|---|
| 12' Dinghy | 1 – 10; 11 – 20 | Odd; Even | 1 – 10; 11 – 20 | Odd; Even | Spare day | ●● | ●● |
| Total gold medals | | | | | | | 1 |

== Course area and course configuration ==
For the 12' Dinghy the courses were just outside the locks on the buiten Y in front of Durgerdam.

At that time the Zuiderzee had an open connection with the North Sea. The sea water was salt or at best brackish.

1928 Olympic Course Areas

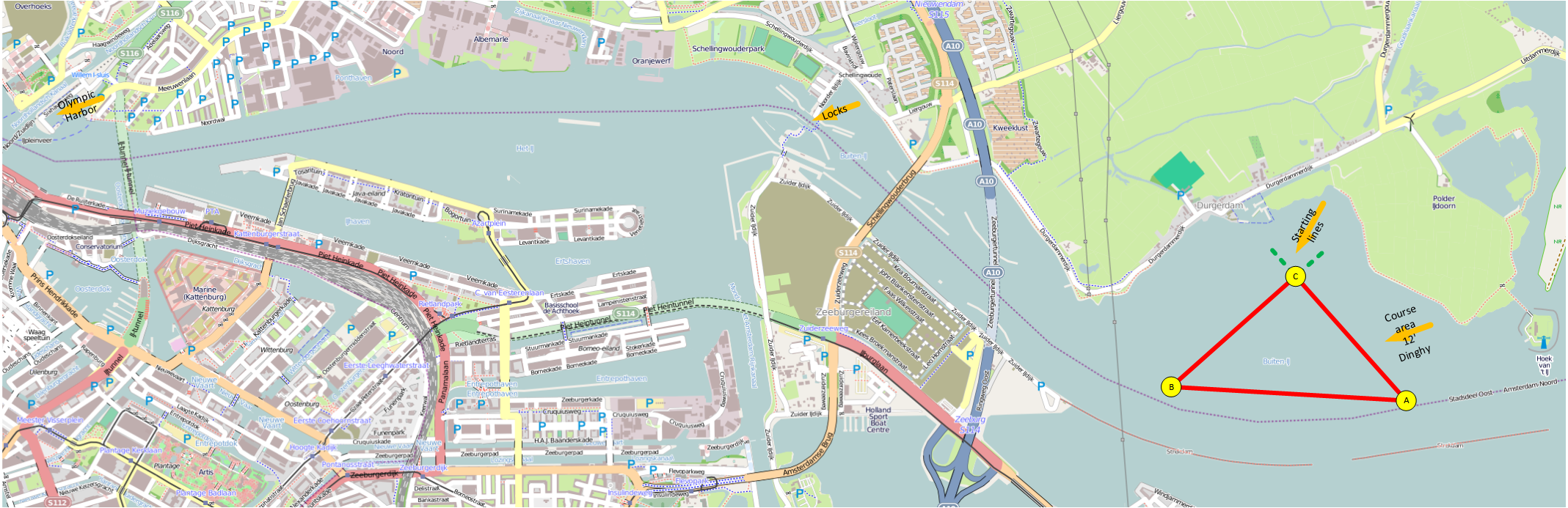
Course area and course for the 12' Dinghy

== Weather conditions ==
| Date | Race | Wind speed | Wind direction |
|---|---|---|---|
| 2-AUG-1928 | 1st race 1 – 10; 2nd race 11 – 20 | 7 knots (3.6 m/s) - 10 knots (5.1 m/s) | |
| 3-AUG-1928 | 1st race odd 2nd race even | 8 knots (4.1 m/s) - 11 knots (5.7 m/s) | |
| 4-AUG-1928 | 1st race 1 – 10; 2nd race 11 – 20 | 11 knots (5.7 m/s) - 17 knots (8.7 m/s) | |
| 5-AUG-1928 | 1st race odd 2nd race even | 13 knots (6.7 m/s) - 21 knots (11 m/s) | |
| 7-AUG-1928 | 2 contests | 8 knots (4.1 m/s) - 11 knots (5.7 m/s) | |
| 8-AUG-1928 | 2 contests | 10 knots (5.1 m/s) - 13 knots (6.7 m/s) | |

== Results ==
The 1928 Olympic scoring system was used.

=== Boat assignments ===
The dinghies sails were assigned as follows:

| Dinghy number (1–10) | Country | Dinghy number (11–20) | Country | Category |
|---|---|---|---|---|
| 1 | Denmark | 11 | Sweden | Odd |
| 2 | South Africa | 12 | Czechoslovakia | Even |
| 3 | Norway | 13 | Switzerland | Odd |
| 4 | Monaco | 14 | Great Britain | Even |
| 5 | Germany | 15 | Belgium | Odd |
| 6 | Italy | 16 | United States | Even |
| 7 | Spain | 17 | Austria | Odd |
| 8 | France | 18 | Finland | Even |
| 9 | Hungary | 19 | Latvia | Odd |
| 10 | Poland | 20 | Netherlands | Even |

=== Final results ===
| Rank | Country | Helmsman | Sail No. | Race 1 | | Race 2 | | Race 3 | | Race 4 | | Race 5 | | Race 6 | | Race 7 | | Race 8 | | Total |
| Rank | Country | Helmsman | Sail No. | Pos. | Pts. | Pos. | Pts. | Pos. | Pts. | Pos. | Pts. | Pos. | Pts. | Pos. | Pts. | Pos. | Pts. | Pos. | Pts. | Total |
| 1st place, gold medalist(s) | Sweden | Sven Thorell | 11 | 6 | 6 | 1 | 1 | 1 | 1 | 2 | 2 | 1 | 1 | 3 | 3 | 1 | 1 | 2 | 2 | 10; 4 x 1st |
| 2nd place, silver medalist(s) | Norway | Henrik Robert | 3 | 1 | 1 | 5 | 5 | 3 | 5 | 1 | 1 | 2 | 2 | 1 | 1 | 4 | 4 | 3 | 3 | 12; 3 x 1st |
| 3rd place, bronze medalist(s) | Finland | Bertil Broman | 18 | 1 | 1 | 2 | 2 | 10 | 10 | 1 | 1 | 3 | 3 | 9 | 9 | 2 | 2 | 6 | 6 | 14; 2 x 1st 2 x 2nd |
| 4 | Netherlands | Willem de Vries Lentsch | 20 | 4 | 4 | 1 | 1 | RET | 10 | 2 | 2 | 7 | 7 | 6 | 6 | 5 | 5 | 1 | 1 | 17; 2 x 1st 1 x 2nd |
| 5 | Germany | Egon Beyn | 5 | 3 | 3 | 2 | 2 | 1 | 1 | 3 | 3 | 4 | 4 | 4 | 4 | 6 | 6 | 7 | 7 | 9; 1 x 1st |
| 6 | Italy | Tito Nordio | 6 | 5 | 5 | 4 | 4 | 2 | 2 | 3 | 3 | RET | 10 | 2 | 2 | 3 | 3 | 5 | 5 | 14; 2 x 2nd |
| 7 | Denmark | Jacob Andersen | 1 | 2 | 2 | 4 | 4 | 4 | 4 | 4 | 4 | 5 | 5 | 8 | 8 | DNS | 10 | DNS | 10 | 14; 1 x 2nd 3 x 4th |
| 8 | Great Britain | Gordon Fowler; Harry R Gaydon | 14 | 5 | 5 | 6 | 6 | 2 | 2 | 5 | 5 | 6 | 6 | 5 | 5 | DSQ | 8 | 4 | 4 | 18; 1 x 2nd 1 x 4th |
| 9 | United States | Manfred Curry | 16 | 3 | 3 | 5 | 5 | 3 | 3 | 4 | 4 | RET | 10 | 7 | 7 | DNS | 10 | DNS | 10 | 15; 2 x 3rd |
| 10 | Latvia | Kurts Klāsens | 19 | 7 | 7 | 3 | 3 | 5 | 5 | 8 | 8 | 8 | 8 | 10 | 10 | 7 | 7 | 8 | 8 | 23; 1 x 3rd |
| 11 | Hungary | Raul Uhl | 11 | 4 | 4 | RET | 10 | 5 | 5 | 5 | 5 | | | | | | | | | 24 |
| 12 | Belgium | Léon Huybrechts | 15 | 2 | 2 | RET | 10 | 4 | 4 | DSQ | 9 | | | | | | | | | 25 |
| 13 | Switzerland | Henri Fivaz | 13 | 8 | 8 | 7 | 7 | RDGa | 7 | 6 | 6 | | | | | | | | | 28 |
| 14 | Spain | Santiago Amat | 7 | 6 | 6 | 6 | 6 | DNS | 10 | 7 | 7 | | | | | | | | | 29 |
| 15 | South Africa | Rupert Ellis-Brown | 2 | 7 | 7 | 3 | 3 | DNS | 10 | DNS | 10 | | | | | | | | | 30 |
| 16 | France | Charles Laverne; Louis Pauly | 8 | RET | 10 | 7 | 7 | RET | 7 | 6 | 6 | | | | | | | | | 30 |
| 17 | Poland | Adam Wolff; Władysław Krzyżanowski | 10 | 8 | 8 | 8 | 8 | DNS | 10 | 7 | 7 | | | | | | | | | 33 |
| 18 | Czechoslovakia | Rudolf Winter | 12 | 10 | 10 | RET | 10 | 6 | 6 | 8 | 8 | | | | | | | | | 34 |
| 19 | Austria | Robert Johanny | 17 | 9 | 9 | RET | 10 | RET | 10 | DNS | 10 | | | | | | | | | 39 |
| 20 | Monaco | Émile Barral | 4 | RET | 10 | WDR | 10 | DNS | 10 | DNS | 10 | | | | | | | | | 40 |

Legend: DNS – Did not start; DSQ – Disqualified; RDGa – Redress given with average points; RET – Retired; WDR – Withdrew;

=== Daily standings ===
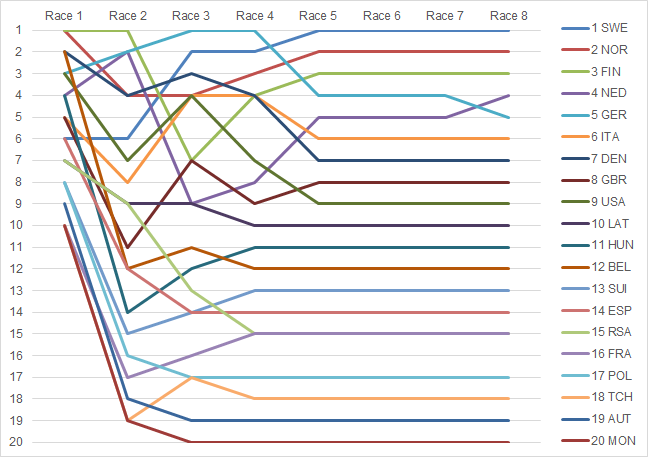
Graph showing the daily standings in the 12' Dinghy during the 1928 Summer Olympics

== Notes ==
- For this event one yacht from each country, manned by 1 amateur maximum (maximum number of substitutes 1) was allowed.
- This event was a gender independent event. However it turned out to be a man's only event.

== Other information ==
During the Sailing regattas at the 1928 Summer Olympics among others the following persons were competing in the various classes:

12'Dinghy sailors at the 1928 Olympic Games
Sven Thorell (SWE)
