= Government of Amsterdam =

Municipality in the Netherlands, containing the cities of Amsterdam and Weesp

Coordinates: 52°22′N 4°53′E

Amsterdam City Council Gemeenteraad van Amsterdam

Type
- Type: City Council

Leadership
- Chairperson: Mayor of Amsterdam

Structure
- Seats: 45
- Political groups: Government (25): PRO (17); D66 (8); Opposition (20): VVD (6); PvdD (3); Volt (2); JA21 (2); DENK (2); BIJ1 (2); CDA (1); FvD (1); SP (1)

Elections
- Last election: 2026
- Next election: 2030

Meeting place
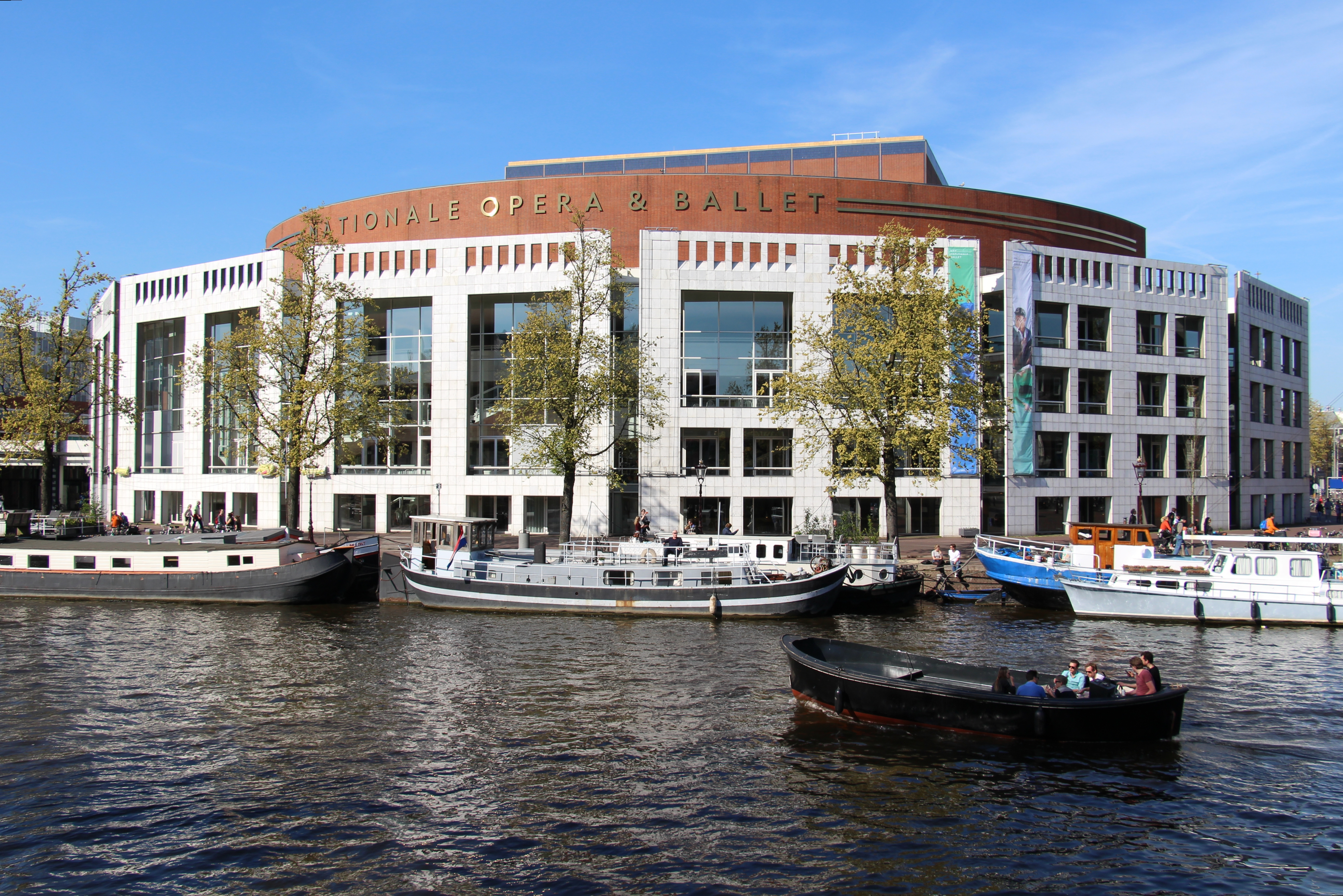
- Amsterdam City Hall, located at Amstel 1 (Stopera building)

Website
- https://www.amsterdam.nl/en/governance/city-council/

The Government of Amsterdam consists of several territorial and functional forms of local and regional government. The principal form of government is the municipality of Amsterdam, Netherlands. The municipality's territory covers the city of Amsterdam as well as a number of small towns. The city of Amsterdam is also part of several functional forms of regional government. These include the Waterschap (water board) of Amstel, Gooi en Vecht, which is responsible for water management, and the Stadsregio (City Region) of Amsterdam, which has responsibilities in the areas of spatial planning and public transport.

The municipality of Amsterdam borders the municipalities of Diemen, De Ronde Venen, Ouder-Amstel, Amstelveen, Stichtse Vecht, Wijdemeren and Hilversum in the south, Haarlemmermeer in the west, and Zaanstad, Oostzaan, Landsmeer and Waterland in the north.

Weesp has been an urban area of the municipality of Amsterdam since 24 March 2022.

== Municipal government ==
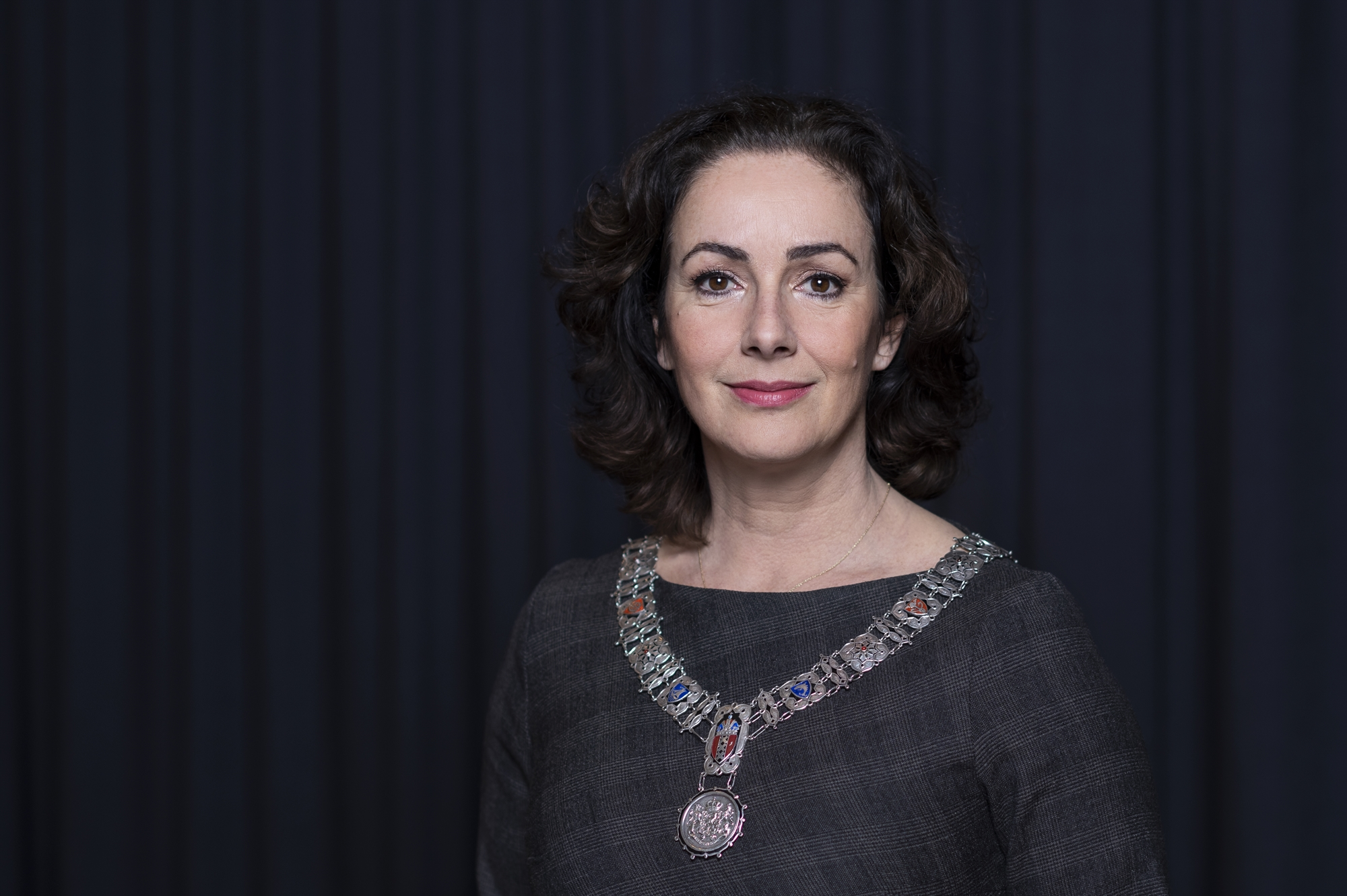
Femke Halsema, mayor of Amsterdam since 2018.

The city of Amsterdam is a municipality under the Dutch Municipalities Act. It is governed by a municipal council (gemeenteraad, also known as 'city council', the principal legislative authority), a municipal executive board (college van burgemeester en wethouders), and a mayor (burgemeester). The mayor is both a member of the municipal executive board and an individual authority with a number of statutory responsibilities, mainly in the area of maintaining public order. The municipal council has 45 seats. Its members are elected for a four-year term through citywide elections on the basis of proportional representation. Under the Municipalities Act, the mayor is appointed for a six-year term by the national government upon nomination by the municipal council. The other members of the executive board (wethouders, or 'alderpersons') are appointed directly by the municipal council, but may be dismissed at any time after a no-confidence vote in the council. Because of this parliamentary system, the alderpersons are not appointed until a governing majority in the council has reached a coalition agreement following council elections.

In July 2010, Eberhard van der Laan (Labour Party) was appointed mayor of Amsterdam by the national government for a six-year term after being nominated by the Amsterdam municipal council. After the 2014 municipal council elections, a governing majority of D66, VVD and SP was formed - the first coalition without the Labour Party since World War II. Next to the mayor, the municipal executive board consists of eight wethouders ('alderpersons') appointed by the municipal council: four D66 alderpersons, two VVD alderpersons and two SP alderpersons.

=== Municipal Government 2006–2010 ===
After the 2006 municipal elections a coalition was formed between PvdA and GroenLinks, with a majority of 27 out of 45. These elections saw a political landslide throughout the country, with a strong shift to the left, of which Amsterdam was a prime example. The much talked about all-left-wing coalition of PvdA, GroenLinks and SP that polls indicate would become possible after the national elections of 2006 and that was such a political success in Nijmegen had its largest majority in Amsterdam, apart from some small towns. PvdA even needed only three more seats to form a coalition and could thus take its pick, which forced potential coalition partners to give in on a lot of issues. In the case of GroenLinks, this was mostly the policy of preventive searching by the police, which they were opposed to but had to allow.

In total, 24 parties took part in the elections, including 11 new ones, but only 7 got seats.

Municipal Executives
Name	Portfolio	Party
Job Cohen	mayor Safety & Internal Affairs	PvdA
Lodewijk Asscher	vice-mayor Finance & Economy	PvdA
Freek Ossel	Education & Income	PvdA
Carolien Gehrels	Culture & Recreation	PvdA
Hans Gerson	Transport & Housing	PvdA
Maarten van Poelgeest	Spatial Planning	GL
Marijke Vos	Environment & Health	GL

Municipal Council
Party	seats	change from 2002
Labour Party	20	▲5
VVD	8	▼1
GreenLeft	7	▲1
Socialist Party	6	▲2
Christian Democratic Appeal	2	▼2
Democrats 66	2	▼1
AA/De Groenen	0	▼1
Mokum Mobiel	0	▼1
Total	45	-

=== Municipal Government 2010–2014 ===
Dutch municipal elections, 2010:

Municipal Executives
Name	Portfolio	Party
Eberhard van der Laan	mayor Safety & Internal Affairs	PvdA
Pieter Hilhorst	vice-mayor Finance & Education	PvdA
Freek Ossel	Housing	PvdA
Carolien Gehrels	Economy & Culture	PvdA
Eric van der Burg	Health & Schiphol	VVD
Eric Wiebes	Transport	VVD
Maarten van Poelgeest	Spatial Planning	GL
Andrée van Es	Income	GL

Municipal Council
Party	seats	change from 2006
Labour Party	15	▼5
VVD	8	0
GreenLeft	7	0
Democrats 66	7	▲5
Socialist Party	3	▼3
Christian Democratic Appeal	2	0
Save Amsterdam	1	▲1
Proud of the Netherlands	1	▲1
Party for the Animals	1	▲1
Total	45	-

=== Municipal Government 2014–2018 ===
Dutch municipal elections, 2014:

Municipal Executives
Name	Portfolio	Party
Eberhard van der Laan	mayor Safety, Internal Affairs & Finance	PvdA
Kajsa Ollongren	vice-mayor Amsterdam-Centrum, Economy, Port, Schiphol & Culture	D66
Udo Kock	Amsterdam-West, Finance & Water Resource Management	D66
Simone Kukenheim	Amsterdam-Oost, Education & Integration	D66
Abdeluheb Choho	Public Space, Climate & ICT	D66
Eric van der Burg	Amsterdam-Zuid, Health, Sport & Spatial Planning	VVD
Pieter Litjens	Amsterdam-Zuidoost, Transport & Real Estate	VVD
Laurens Ivens	Amsterdam-Noord, Housing & Animal Welfare	SP
Arjan Vliegenthart	Amsterdam Nieuw-West, Labour, Income & Poverty	SP

Municipal Council
Party	seats	change from 2010
Democrats 66	14	▲7
Labour Party	10	▼5
VVD	6	▼2
GreenLeft	6	▼1
Socialist Party	6	▲3
Christian Democratic Appeal	1	▼1
Party for the Animals	1	0
Party for the Senior Citizens	1	▲1
Save Amsterdam	0	▼1
Proud of the Netherlands	0	▼1
Total	45	-

=== Municipal Government 2018–2022 ===
Dutch municipal elections, 2018:

Municipal Executives
Name	Portfolio	Party
Femke Halsema	Mayor of Amsterdam; General Affairs, Safety, Legal Affairs, & Communications	GL
Marieke van Doorninck	Spatial Development, & Sustainability	GL
Rutger Groot Wassink	Social Affairs, Democratization, & Diversity	GL
Touria Meliani	Arts and Culture, & Digital City	GL
Sharon Dijksma	Traffic and Transport, Water, & Air quality	PvdA
Marjolein Moorman	Education, Poverty, & Civic Integration	PvdA
Udo Kock	Finance, Economic Affairs, & Zuidas	D66
Simone Kukenheim	Care, Youth, Education and Training, & Sport	D66
Laurens Ivens	Housing, Construction, & Public Space	SP

Party		Votes	%	+/−	Seats	+/−
GreenLeft	GL	70,880	20.4	+9.6	10	+4
Democrats 66	D66	55,724	16.1	−10.7	8	−6
People's Party for Freedom and Democracy	VVD	39,702	11.4	+0.2	6	+0
Labour Party	PvdA	37,181	10.7	−7.7	5	−5
Socialist Party	SP	26,070	7.5	−3.7	3	−3
Party for the Animals	PvdD	24,672	7.1	+4.3	3	+2
Denk	DENK	23,138	6.7	New	3	New
Forum for Democracy	FvD	20,015	5.8	New	3	New
Christian Democratic Appeal	CDA	11,991	3.5	+0.7	1	+0
Party for the Elderly	PvdO	7,752	2.2	+0.1	1	+0
Christian Union	CU	6,837	2.0	+0.2	1	+1
Amsterdam Bij1	BIJ1	6,571	1.9	New	1	New
Pirate Party Amsterdam	PPNL	4,459	1.3	−0.5	0	+0
50PLUS	50+	4,233	1.2	New	0	New
Other		7,923	2.3		0	
Total valid votes		347,148	100		45	
Invalid/blank votes		4,511	1.3			
Total & turnout		351,659	51.2	+1.9		
Source: Verkiezingsuitslagen

=== Municipal Government 2022–2026 ===
Municipal Executives
Name	Portfolio	Party
Femke Halsema	Mayor of Amsterdam; General Affairs, Safety, Legal Affairs, & Communications	GL
Marjolein Moorman	Education, Poverty, Civic Integration, Masterplan Zuidoost	PvdA
Sofyan Mbarki	Economic Affairs, Sport & Recreation, MBO Agenda, Vocational Education & Labour Market Integration, Youth Work, Inner City Affairs	PvdA
Hester van Buren	Finance, Personnel & Organisation, Coordination of operations, Services, Air and Sea Port, Coordination of purchasing	PvdA
Rutger Groot Wassink	Social Affairs, Shelter, Municipal Holdings, Democratization, Development Plan Nieuw-West	GL
Zita Pels	Sustainability & Circular Economy, Public Housing	GL
Touria Meliani	Arts and Culture, Monuments & Heritage, Events, Inclusion and Antidiscrimination policy	GL
Reinier van Dantzig	Housing construction, Land & Development, Spatial Planning	D66
Melanie van der Horst	Traffic, transport & air quality, Public Space & Green, Water, Development Plan Amsterdam-Noord)	D66
Shula Rijxman	Care & social development, Public Health & Prevention, ICT and Digital City, Local Media, Participations	D66

Party	Votes	%	Seats	+/–
Labour Party	57,093	17.57	9	+4
GroenLinks	48,096	14.80	8	–2
Democrats 66	44,732	13.77	7	–1
People's Party for Freedom and Democracy	34,180	10.52	5	–1
Amsterdam BIJ1	22,623	6.96	3	+2
Party for the Animals	22,031	6.78	3	0
Volt	14,043	4.32	2	New
Socialist Party	14,036	4.32	2	–1
JA21	13,691	4.21	2	New
DENK	13,039	4.01	2	–1
Christian Democratic Appeal	8,270	2.55	1	0
Forum for Democracy	6,688	2.06	1	–2
Other parties	26,347	8.11	0	–2
Total	324,869	100.00	45	–
Valid votes	324,869	99.11		
Invalid/blank votes	2,924	0.89		
Total votes	327,793	100.00		
Registered voters/turnout	703,714	46.58		
Source: Kiesraad

=== Municipal Government 2026–present ===
Municipal Executives
Name	Portfolio	Party
Femke Halsema	Mayor of Amsterdam; General Affairs, Safety, Legal Affairs, & Communications	GL
Zita Pels	Housing, housing development, asylum and reception, and the South East Master Plan	PRO
Sofyan Mbarki	Work and Income, Income Security, Academic Institutions, Sports and Physical Activity, Community Facilities, Municipal Holdings, and the New West Master Plan	PRO
Esmah Lahlah	Education, including libraries, Youth Care, Youth Work and Youth Development	PRO
Hendrik Jan Biemond	Finance, Arts and Culture, Human Resources and Organisation, including business operations, and Animal Welfare	PRO
Araya Sumter	Social Justice, including poverty reduction and debt support, support for victims of the childcare benefits scandal, Diversity and Inclusion, Inclusive Organisation, and coordination of targeted investment for equal opportunities	PRO
Lian Heinhuis	Sustainability and Energy Transition, Green Spaces and Outdoor Play, Water, Heritage, Food Strategy and Waste	PRO
Melanie van der Horst	Economic Affairs, Services, City Centre Approach, Digital Affairs and the North Approach	D66
Alexander Scholtes	Spatial Planning, Construction Stimulation, Land and Development, Healthcare, and Older Adults, including senior housing	D66
Elise Moeskops	Mobility, Public Space, Waterways, Municipal Property and Events	D66

Party	Votes	%	Seats	+/–
GroenLinks (Note: After the election GroenLinks and Labour formed a joint parliamentary group under the name PRO Amsterdam.)	61,706	17.93	10	+2
Democrats 66	55,377	16.09	8	+1
Labour Party	48,423	14.07	7	-2
People's Party for Freedom and Democracy	37,406	10.87	6	+1
Party for the Animals	20,391	5.92	3	0
Volt	17,478	5.08	2	New
JA21	16,907	4.91	2	0
DENK	16,372	4.76	2	0
Amsterdam BIJ1	12,931	3.76	2	-1
Christian Democratic Appeal	10,927	3.17	1	0
Forum for Democracy	10,476	3.04	1	0
Socialist Party	10,248	2.98	1	–1
Other parties	25,535	7.42	0	0
Total	344,177	100.00	45	–
Valid votes	344,177	99.15		
Invalid/blank votes	2,944	0.85		
Total votes	347,121	100.00		
Registered voters/turnout	737,489	47.07		
Source: Kiesraad

== Boroughs & urban area ==
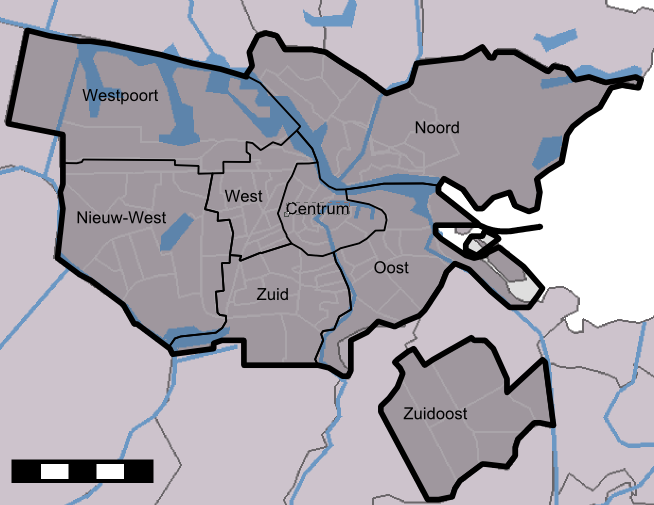
The 7 boroughs of Amsterdam since May 1, 2010, plus Westpoort, which is directly governed by the municipality

Name	Designation	Areas
Centrum (Centre)	Stadsdeel (Borough)	Binnenstad, Grachtengordel with Jordaan, Plantage, Westelijke Eilanden and Oostelijke Eilanden
Nieuw-West (New West)	Stadsdeel (Borough)	Slotermeer, Geuzenveld, Slotervaart, Overtoomse Veld, Nieuw Sloten, Osdorp, De Aker and the villages Sloten and Oud-Osdorp
Noord (North)	Stadsdeel (Borough)	Tuindorp Oostzaan, Kadoelen, Oostzanerwerf, Buiksloot, Buikslotermeer, Nieuwendam and Landelijk Noord, with the villages Schellingwoude, Durgerdam, Zunderdorp, Ransdorp, Holysloot
Oost (East)	Stadsdeel (Borough)	Weesperzijde, Oosterparkbuurt, Dapperbuurt, Transvaalbuurt, Oostpoort, Watergraafsmeer, Indische Buurt, Oostelijk Havengebied, the Zeeburgereiland and IJburg
West	Stadsdeel (Borough)	Spaarndammerbuurt, Staatsliedenbuurt, Frederik Hendrikbuurt, Kinkerbuurt and surrounding Overtoom, Admiralenbuurt, surrounding Hoofdweg, Mercatorplein, Landlust, Bos en Lommer and the village Sloterdijk
Zuid (South)	Stadsdeel (Borough)	De Pijp, Museumkwartier, Willemspark, Schinkelbuurt, Hoofddorppleinbuurt, Stadionbuurt, Apollobuurt, Rivierenbuurt, Prinses Irenebuurt, Zuidas and Buitenveldert
Zuidoost (Southeast)	Stadsdeel (Borough)	Venserpolder, Bijlmer, Gaasperdam and Bullewijk
Weesp	Stadsgebied (Urban area)	the city Weesp and the village Driemond

Unlike most other Dutch municipalities, Amsterdam is subdivided into 7 boroughs (stadsdelen or 'districts') and 1 urban area (stadsgebied) Weesp. This system was implemented in the 1980s and significantly reformed in 2014. Before 2014, the boroughs were responsible for many activities that previously had been run by the central city. The idea was to bring the government closer to the people. All of these had their own district council (deelraad), chosen by a popular election. Local decisions were made at borough level, and only affairs pertaining the whole city (like major infrastructural projects), were delegated to the central city council. As of 2014, the powers of the boroughs have been significantly reduced, although they still have an elected council called bestuurscommissie ('district committee').

On 24 March 2022, the city of Weesp merged with Amsterdam. Thus Weesp became an urban area of the municipality of Amsterdam. Westpoort covers the western harbour area of Amsterdam. This is not a borough, because it has very few inhabitants and it is governed directly by the central municipal council.

== Population centers ==
Amsterdam, Driemond, Durgerdam, Holysloot, 't Nopeind, Osdorp, Ransdorp, Sloten, Sloterdijk, Zunderdorp.

== International cooperation ==
Cities (and country) of international cooperation:

- Accra, Ghana
- Beira, Mozambique
- Budapest, Hungary
- İzmit, Turkey
- Managua, Nicaragua
- Riga, Latvia
- Suriname

Sister ports:

- Accra, Ghana
- Beijing, China
- Cape Town, South Africa
- Halifax, Canada
- San Pédro, Ivory Coast
- Xiamen, China
