= 't Nopeind =

Coordinates: 52°25′N 4°58′E

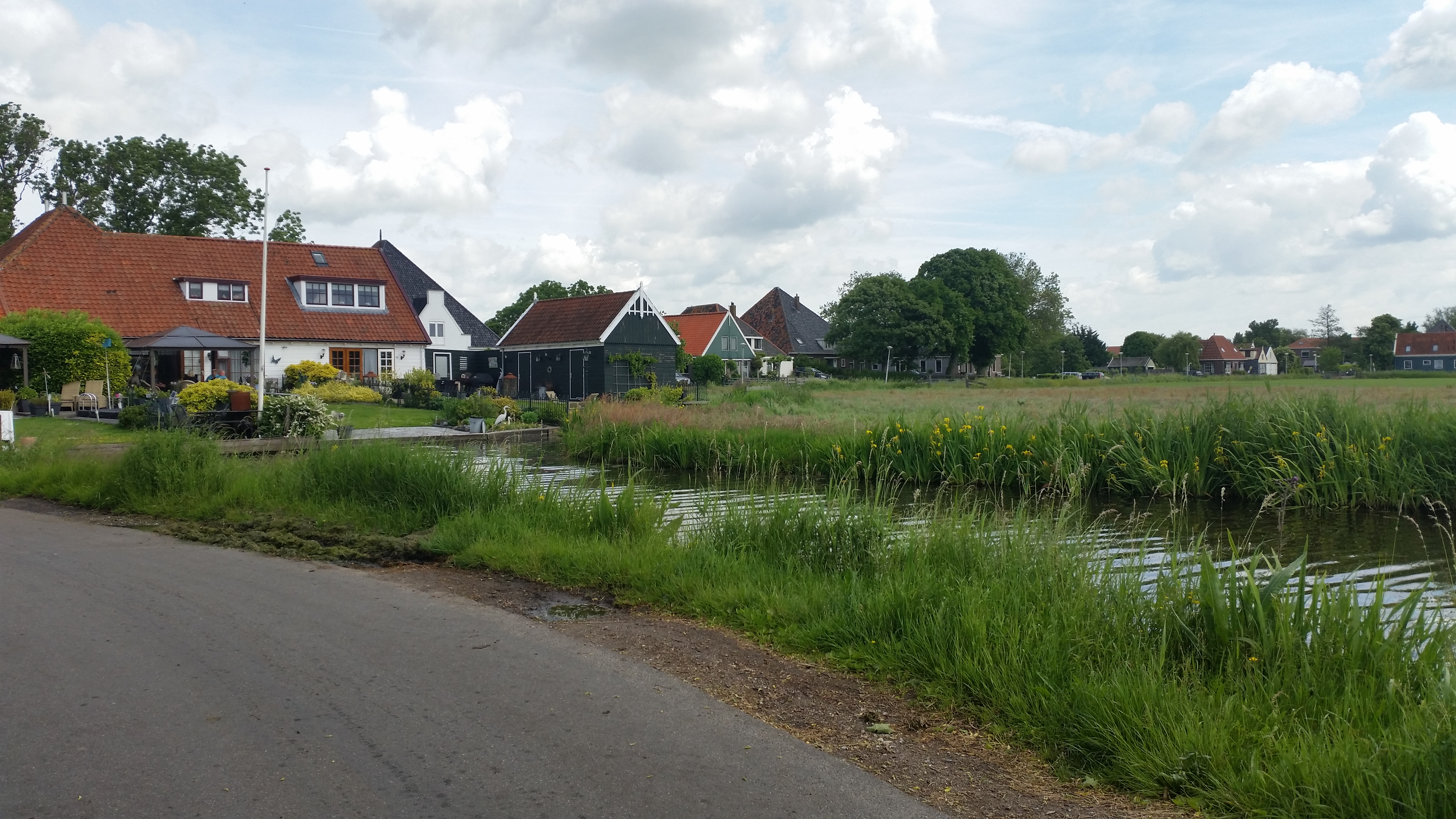

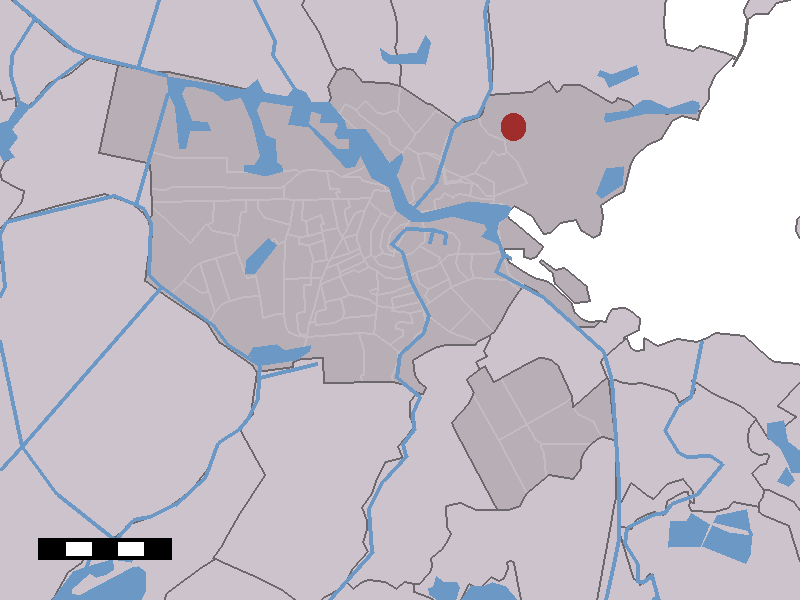
- 't Nopeind in the municipality of Amsterdam.

- Location within Netherlands
- Country: Netherlands
- Province: North Holland
- Municipality: Amsterdam

't Nopeind is a hamlet in the Dutch province of North Holland. It is a part of the municipality of Amsterdam, and lies about 7 km northeast of the city centre, just north of Zunderdorp.

't Nopeind is a part of the deelgemeente (sub-municipality) Amsterdam-Noord. The hamlet has about 35 inhabitants.
