= Władysław Krzyżanowski =

Polish sailor (1905–1985)

Personal information
- Nationality: Polish
- Born: 12 August 1905 Minsk, Russian Empire
- Died: 15 August 1985 (aged 80) Warsaw, Poland

Sailing career
- Sport: Sailing
- Club: Wojskowy Yacht Klub Warszawa
- Class: 12' Dinghy
Competition record
Sailing
Representing Poland
Olympic Games
| 1928 Amsterdam | 12' Dinghy |
- Updated on 20 March 2015

Władysław Krzyżanowski (1905–1985) was a sailor from Poland, who represented his country at the 1928 Summer Olympics in Amsterdam, Netherlands.

== Sources ==
- "Władysław Krzyżanowski Bio, Stats, and Results". Olympic Sports. Sports-Reference.com. Archived from the original on 18 April 2020.
