= Egon Beyn =

German Olympian

Personal information
- Nationality: German
- Born: 2 December 1904
- Died: 18 November 1963 (aged 58)

Sailing career
- Class: 12' Dinghy
- Club: Norddeutscher Regatta Verein

Egon Beyn (2 December 1904 – 18 November 1963) was a sailor from Germany, who represented his country at the 1928 Summer Olympics in Amsterdam, Netherlands.
