= Fivaz =

Fivaz is a surname. Notable people with the surname include:

- Bill Fivaz (born 1934), American numismatist and author
- Henri Fivaz, Swiss sailor and Olumpian
- Julien Fivaz (born 1979), Swiss long jumper
