= Jacob Andersen (sailor) =

Danish sailor

Personal information
- Full name: Jens Jacob Andersen
- Nationality: Danish
- Born: 16 May 1892 Tikøb
- Died: 3 May 1955 (aged 62) Copenhagen

Sport

Sailing career
- Class: 12' Dinghy
- Club: Øresunds Sejlklub Frem

Jens Jacob Andersen was a sailor from Denmark, who represented his country at the 1928 Summer Olympics in Amsterdam, Netherlands.

== Sources ==
- "Jacob Andersen Bio, Stats, and Results". Olympic Sports. Sports-Reference.com. Archived from the original on 10 September 2015.
