= Robert Johanny =

Austrian sailor

Personal information
- Nationality: Austrian
- Born: 5 January 1879
- Died: 28 February 1959 (aged 80)

Sailing career
- Sport: Sailing
- Class: 12' Dinghy
Competition record
Sailing
Representing Austria
Olympic Games
1928 Amsterdam	12' Dinghy
- Updated on 20 March 2015

Robert Johanny (5 January 1879 – 28 February 1959) was a sailor from Austria, who represented his country at the 1928 Summer Olympics in Amsterdam, Netherlands.

== Sources ==
- "Robert Johanny Bio, Stats, and Results". Olympic Sports. Sports-Reference.com. Archived from the original on 18 April 2020.
