= Harold Gaydon =

British sailor

Personal information
- Full name: Harold R. Gaydon
- Nationality: British

Sport

Sailing career
- Class: 12' Dinghy

Harold R. Gaydon was a sailor from Great Britain, who represented his country at the 1928 Summer Olympics in Amsterdam, Netherlands.

== Sources ==
- "Harold Gaydon Bio, Stats, and Results". Olympic Sports. Sports-Reference.com. Archived from the original on 29 June 2017.
