= Adam Wolff =

Polish sailor (1899–1984)

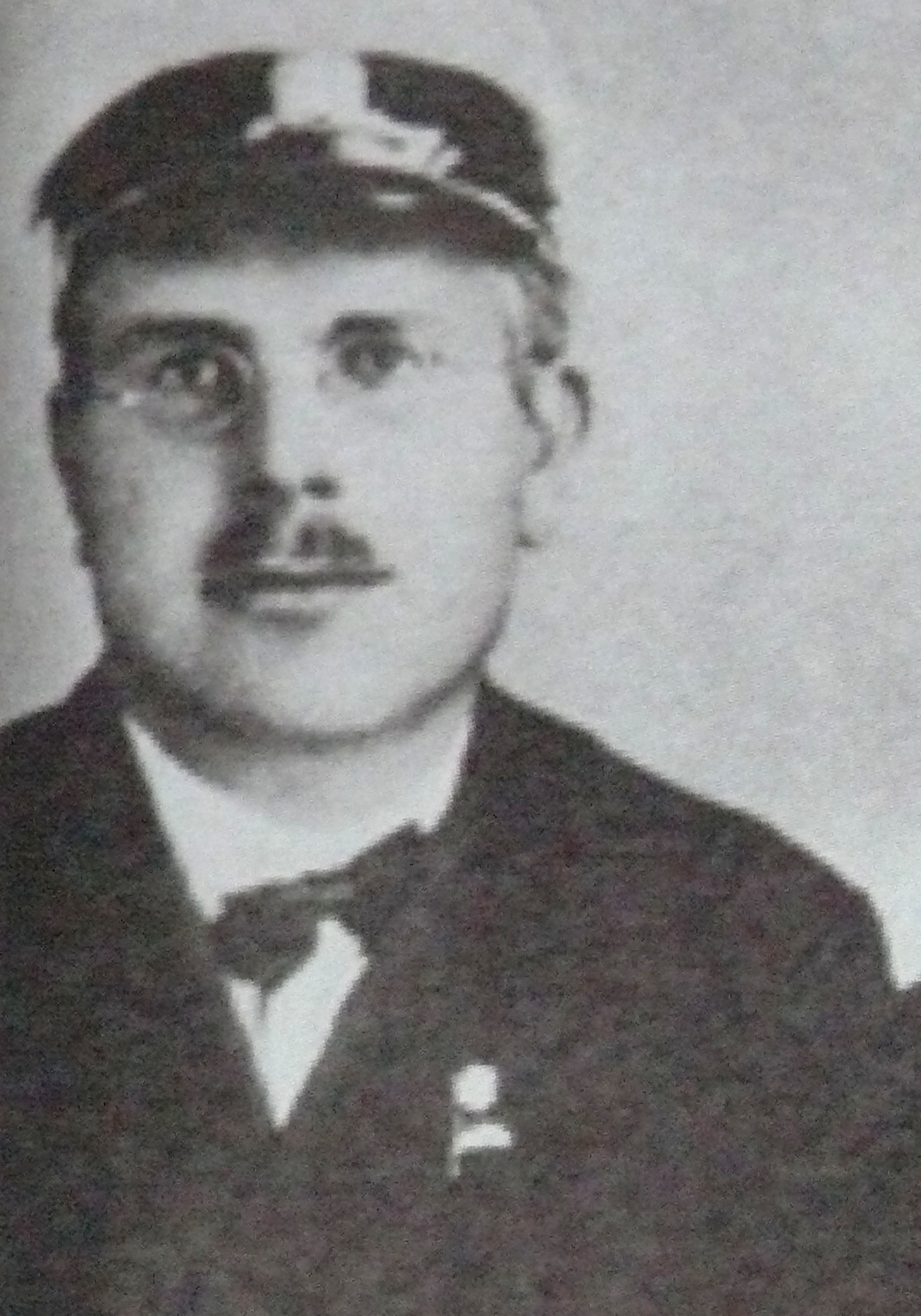

Personal information
- Nationality: Polish
- Born: 14 August 1899 Warsaw, Russian Empire
- Died: 17 February 1984 (aged 84) Warsaw, Poland

Sailing career
- Sport: Sailing
- Club: Rodziny Urzędniczej Warszawa
- Class: 12' Dinghy
Competition record
Sailing
Representing Poland
Olympic Games
1928 Amsterdam	12' Dinghy
- Updated on 20 March 2015

Adam Wolff (14 August 1899 – 17 February 1984) was a Polish historian and sailor, who represented Poland at the 1928 Summer Olympics in Amsterdam, Netherlands.
