= Kurts Klāsens =

Latvian sailor (1895–1973)

Personal information
- Nationality: Latvian
- Born: Kurt Classen; 1895
- Died: 1973 (aged 77–78)

Sailing career
- Sport: Sailing
- Club: Vidzemes jahtklubs
- Class: 12' Dinghy
Competition record
Sailing
Representing Latvia
Olympic Games
10th	1928 Amsterdam	12' Dinghy
- Updated on 20 March 2015

Kurts Klāsens (Kurt Classen, 1895–1973) was a sailor from Latvia, who represented his country at the 1928 Summer Olympics in Amsterdam, Netherlands.

== Sources ==
- "Kurts Klāsens Bio, Stats, and Results". Olympic Sports. Sports-Reference.com. Archived from the original on 18 April 2020.
