= Thorell =

Thorell may refer to various people

- Tamerlan Thorell (1830–1901), Swedish arachnologist
- Hildegard Katarina Thorell (1850–1930), Swedish portrait painter
- Olle Thorell (born 1967), Swedish politician
- Olof Thorell (1909–1992), Swedish linguist
- Sven Thorell (1888–1974), Swedish boat constructor, winner of Olympic gold medal in sailing in Amsterdam 1928
