= Louis Pauly (sailor) =

French Olympic sailor (1906–1992)

Personal information
- Full name: Louis Ambroise Marie Pauly
- Nationality: French
- Born: 4 April 1906 Les Mureaux, France
- Died: 14 December 1992 (aged 86) Chantilly, Oise, France

Sailing career
- Sport: Sailing
- Class: 12' Dinghy
Competition record
Sailing
Representing France
Olympic Games
1928 Amsterdam	12' Dinghy
- Updated on 20 March 2015

Louis Ambroise Marie Pauly (4 April 1906 – 14 December 1992) was a sailor from France, who represented his country at the 1928 Summer Olympics in Amsterdam, Netherlands.
