= Raul Uhl =

Hungarian sailor

Personal information
- Nationality: Hungarian
- Born: 8 April 1907; Budapest
- Died: 22 June 2002 (aged 95)

Sailing career
- Class: 12' Dinghy
- Club: Balatontüredi Yacht Klub
- Updated on 20 March 2015

Raul Uhl (8 April 1907 – 22 June 2002) was a sailor from Hungary, who represented his country at the 1928 Summer Olympics in Amsterdam, Netherlands.

== Sources ==
- "Raul Uhl Bio, Stats, and Results". Olympic Sports. Sports-Reference.com. Archived from the original on 18 April 2020.
