= Charles Laverne =

French sailor

Personal information
- Full name: Charles Henri André Laverne
- Nationality: French
- Born: 23 November 1903 Paris
- Died: 11 June 1987 (aged 83) Évecquemont

Sport

Sailing career
- Class: 12' Dinghy
Competition record
Sailing
Representing France
Olympic Games
1928 Amsterdam	12' Dinghy
- Updated on 20 March 2015

Charles Henri André Laverne (1903-1987) was a sailor from France, who represented his country at the 1928 Summer Olympics in Amsterdam, Netherlands.

== Sources ==
- "Charles Laverne Bio, Stats, and Results". Olympic Sports. Sports-Reference.com. Archived from the original on 17 April 2020.
