= Sailing at the 1920 Summer Olympics – 12' Dinghy =

12' Dinghy at the Games of the VII Olympiad
- Line drawing of the 12' Dinghy
- Venue: Belgium, Ostend; Netherlands, Amsterdam
- Dates: First race: 7 July 1920; Last race: 3 September 1920
- Competitors: 5 from 1 nation
- Teams: 2

Medalists
1st place, gold medalist(s)		Cornelis Hin, Johan Hin, Frans Hin	Netherlands
2nd place, silver medalist(s)		Arnoud van der Biesen, Petrus Beukers	Netherlands

The 12' Dinghy was a sailing event on the Sailing at the 1920 Summer Olympics program in Ostend and Amsterdam. Four races were scheduled. 5 sailors, on 2 boats, from 1 nation entered.

== Race schedule ==
●	Opening ceremony	●	Event competitions	●	Event finals	●	Closing ceremony

Date	July Belgium				September Netherlands		
Date	7 Wed	8 Thu	9 Fri	10 Sat	3 Fri	4 Sat	5 Sun
12' Dinghy (planning)	●	●	●	●			
Total gold medals				1			
12' Dinghy (actual)	1				2	Dutch national races	
Total gold medals					1		

== Course area ==
12' Dinghy 1920 Olympic Course Areas

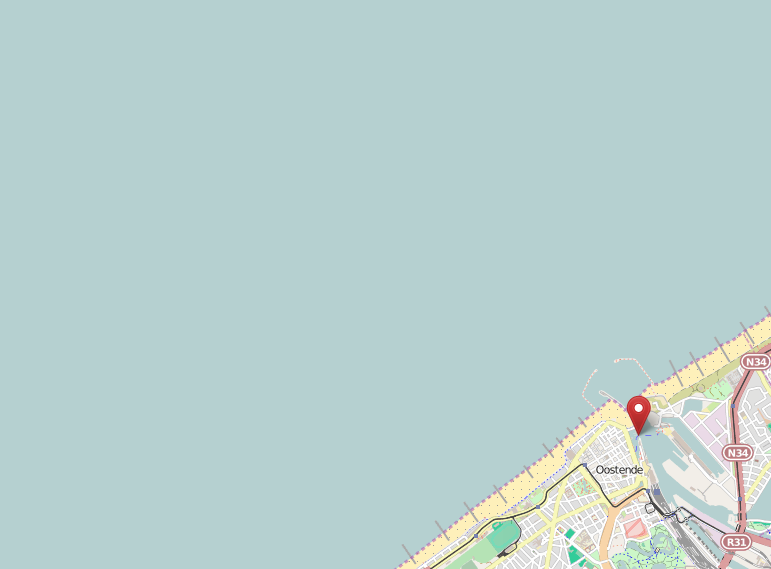
Ostend, Belgium

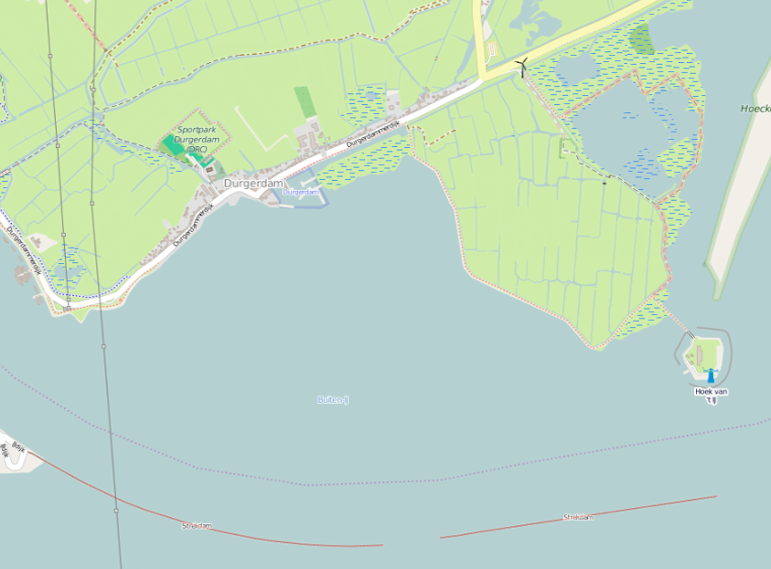
Buiten Y. The Netherlands

== Weather conditions ==
Date	Max temperature	Wind speed	Average wind direction
7 July 1920	Unknown		
8 July 1920	Unknown		
3 September 1920	18.8 °C (65.8 °F)	3.6 metres per second (7.0 kn) - 8.2 metres per second (15.9 kn)	

== Final results ==
The 1920 Olympic scoring system was used. All competitors were male.

Rank	Country	Helmsman	Crew	Boat	Race 1		Race 2		Race 3		Race 4		Total
Rank	Country	Helmsman	Crew	Boat	Pos.	Pts.	Pos.	Pts.	Pos.	Pts.	Pos.	Pts.	Total
1st place, gold medalist(s)	Netherlands	Cornelis Hin (race 1 & 2); Frans Hin (race 3 & 4)	Johan Hin	Beatrijs III	2	2	CAN	0	1	1	1	1	4
2nd place, silver medalist(s)	Netherlands	Arnoud van der Biesen	Petrus Beukers	Boreas	1	1	CAN	0	1	1	DNF	3	6

Legend: DNF – Did not finish; CAN – Race cancelled;

== Daily standings ==
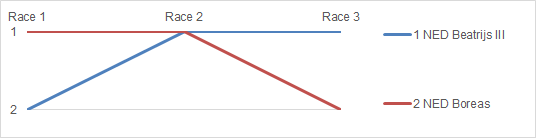
Graph showing the daily standings in the 12' Dinghy during the 1920 Summer Olympics

== Notes ==
- This was the first Olympic event ever, and the only Olympic sailing event, that was held outside the organizing country.
- During the second race, one of the marks was drifting, meaning the race was cancelled. Since the organizers did not have time to re-sail the race that week, the two remaining races were rescheduled for September 3. Because both contenders were Dutch, the organizers requested the Olympic Committee to organize the race in Amsterdam Buiten Y, which was accepted.
- Cornelis Hin helmed in race No. I and the cancelled race No. II, Frans Hin helmed the two races in Amsterdam.

== Other information ==
=== Sailors ===
During the Sailing regattas at the 1920 Summer Olympics among others the following persons were competing in the various classes:

12' Dinghy sailors at the 1920 Olympic Games
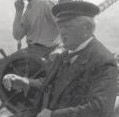
Cornelis Hin, helmed the two races in Ostend

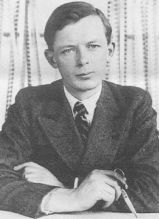
Johan Hin, crewed all races
