= Ransdorp =

Coordinates: 52°24′N 5°0′E

- Neighbourhood of Amsterdam
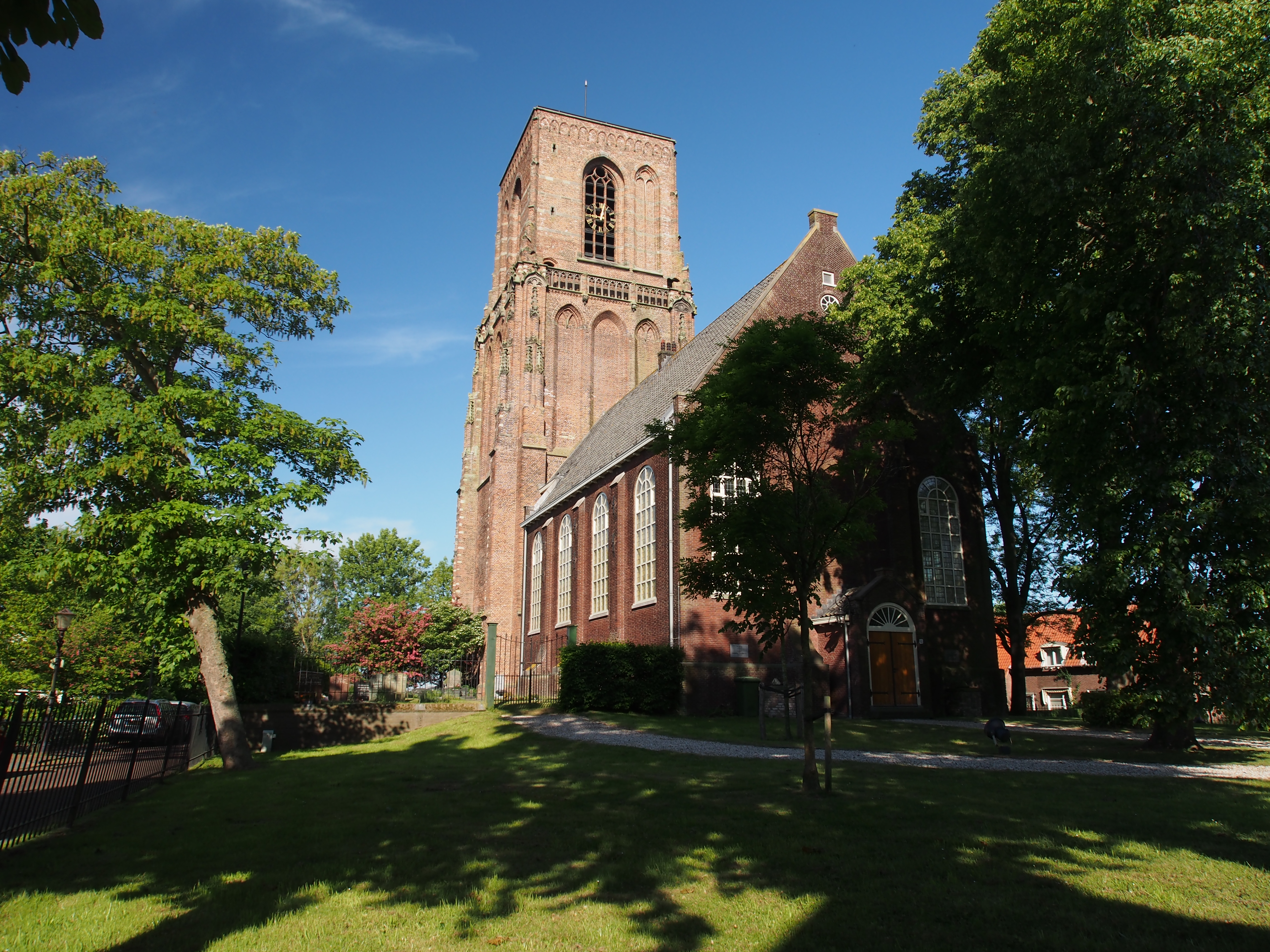
- Church of Ransdorp

- Coat of arms

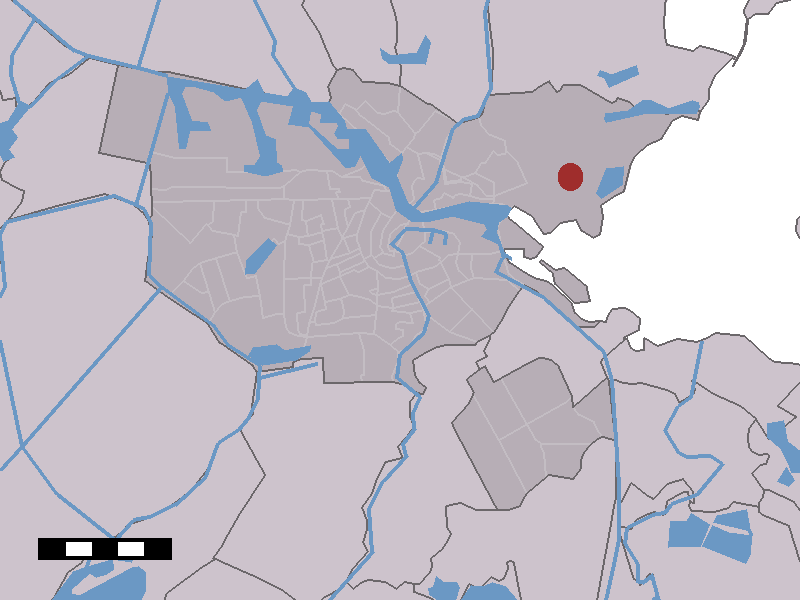
- Location of Ransdorp in Amsterdam
- Country: Netherlands
- Province: North Holland
- Municipality: Amsterdam
- Borough: Noord

Ransdorp is a village in the province of North Holland, Netherlands, part of the municipality of Amsterdam. It lies about 7 km northeast of the city centre, in the Landelijk Noord district. Ransdorp is a part of the borough (Dutch: stadsdeel) Amsterdam-Noord and has about 245 inhabitants.

In 1840, the village had 292 inhabitants, living in 44 houses. Ransdorp was a separate municipality until 1921, when it merged with Amsterdam so that the Government of Amsterdam could ensure that the village's infrastructure was well-maintained. The municipality also covered the villages of Durgerdam, Holysloot and Schellingwoude. The village has an exceptional number of buildings labelled as Rijksmonumenten; its church is the best known. The village's main sources of revenue are dairy farming and tourism. Ransdorp is served by public bus lines operated by the Gemeentelijk Vervoerbedrijf (GVB).

Ransdorp was visited by the American reality television show The Amazing Race 12 in 2007. Contestants had to perform a traditional fierljeppen river vault before completing the "leg" at a local yacht club in Durgerdam. The show returned to the village five years later on The Amazing Race 21 to perform a "Switchback" of fierljeppen task again before ending the leg near the church of Ransdorp. In 2016, the village was featured on the Chinese reality show Race the World as the site of a geese herding task. In 2020, the village appeared on the Israeli reality show HaMerotz LaMillion 8 as the site of a fierljeppen task.

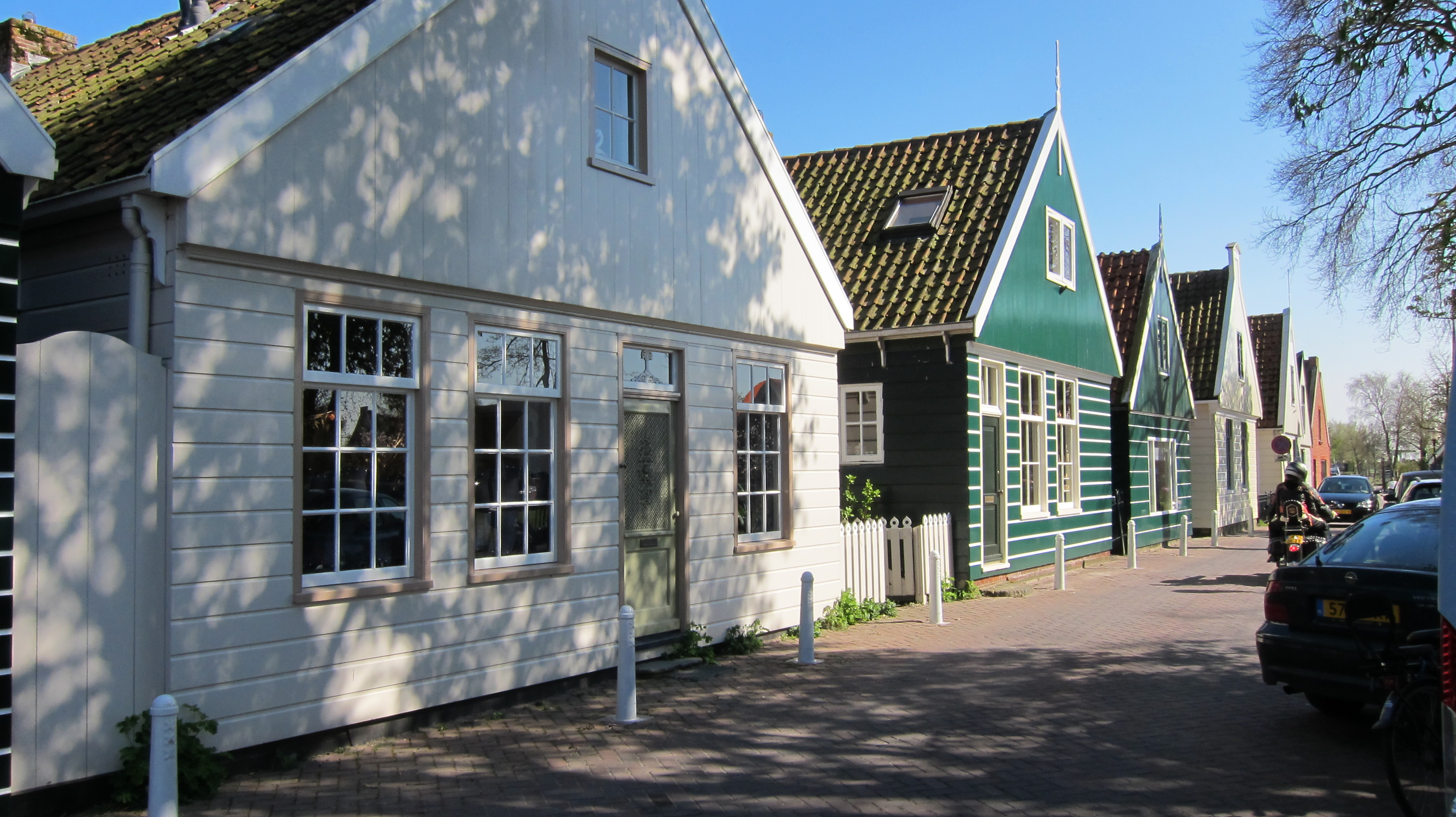
Typical wooden houses

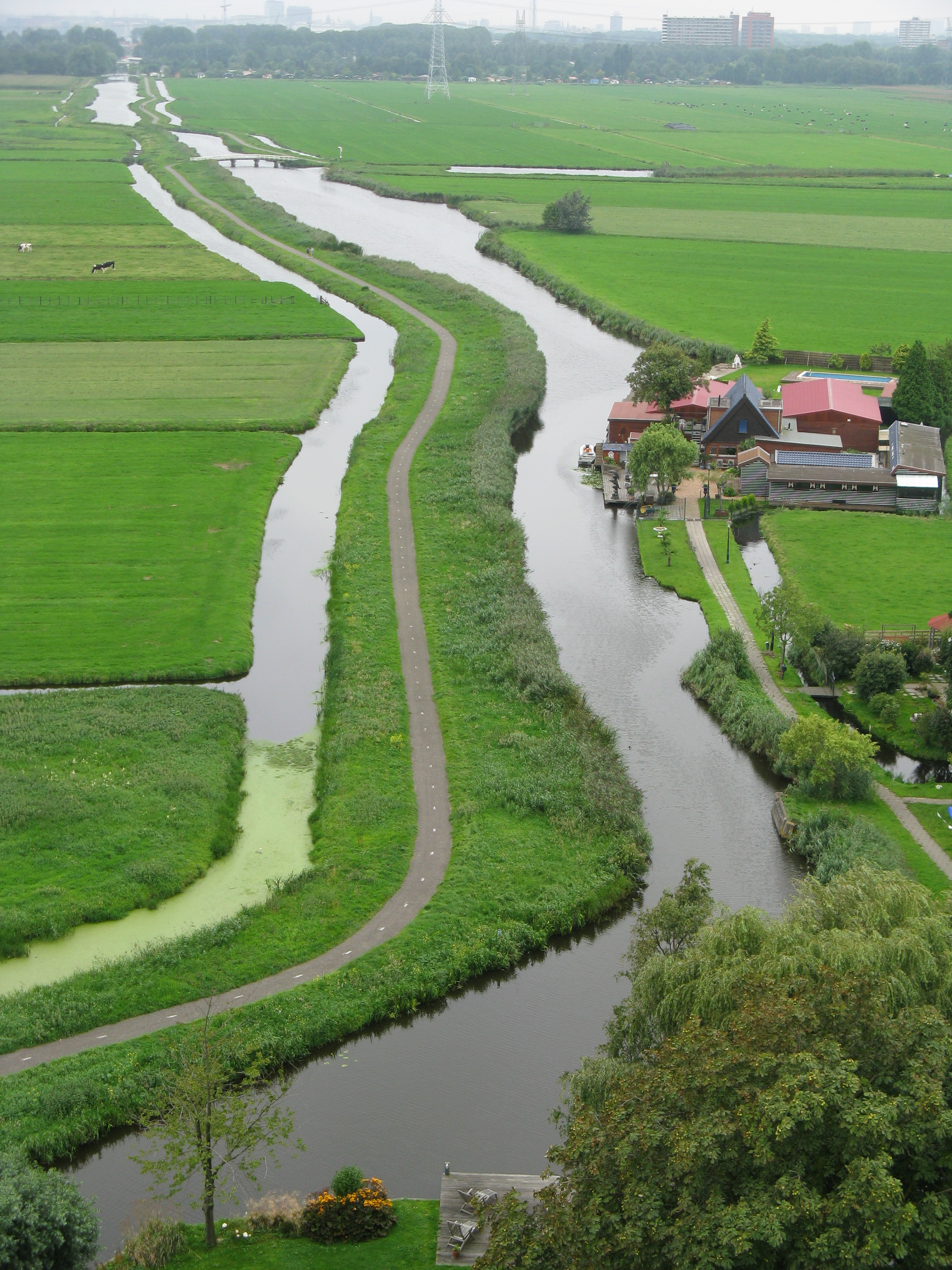
Landscape outside Ransdorp

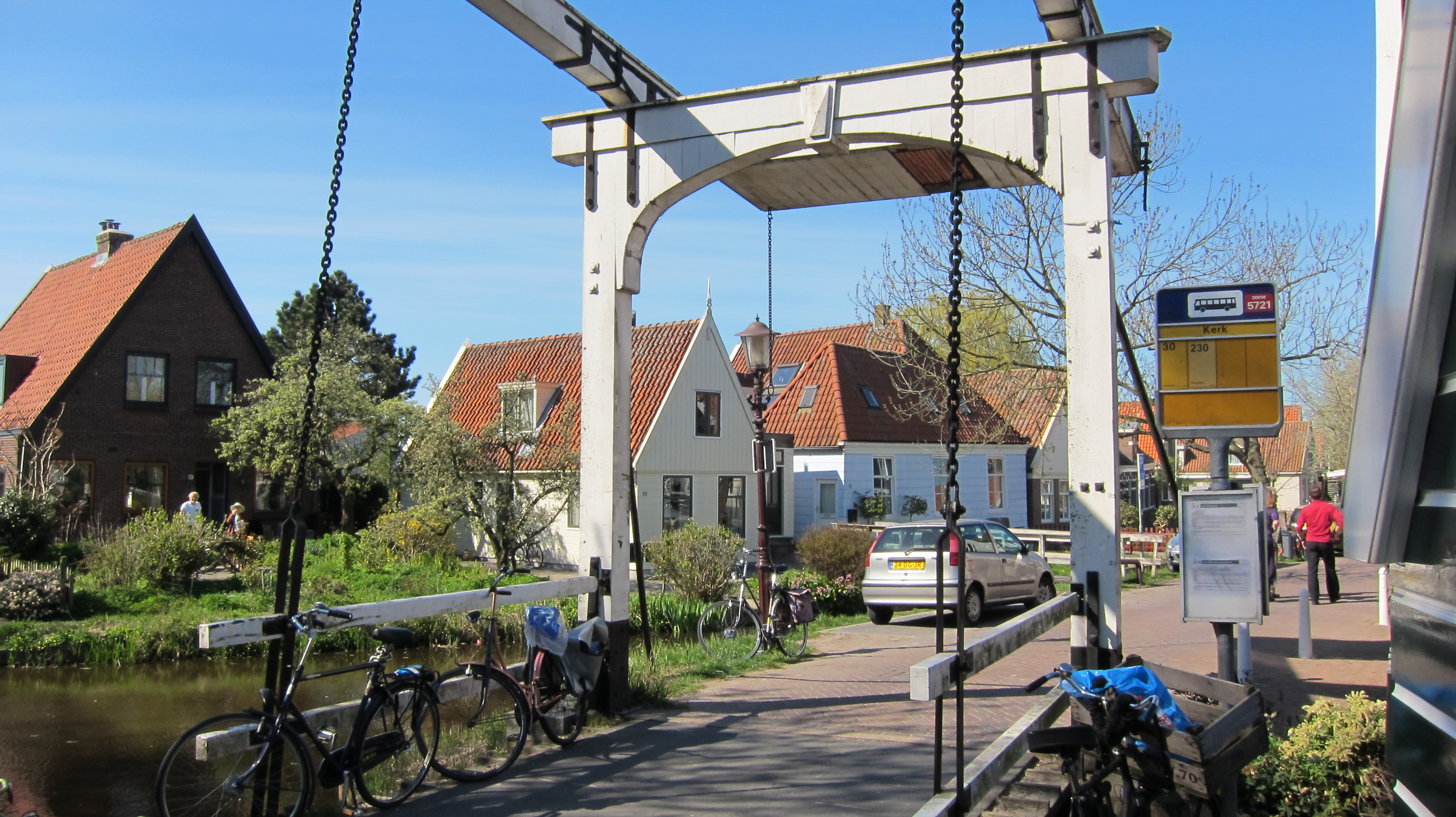
Village centre

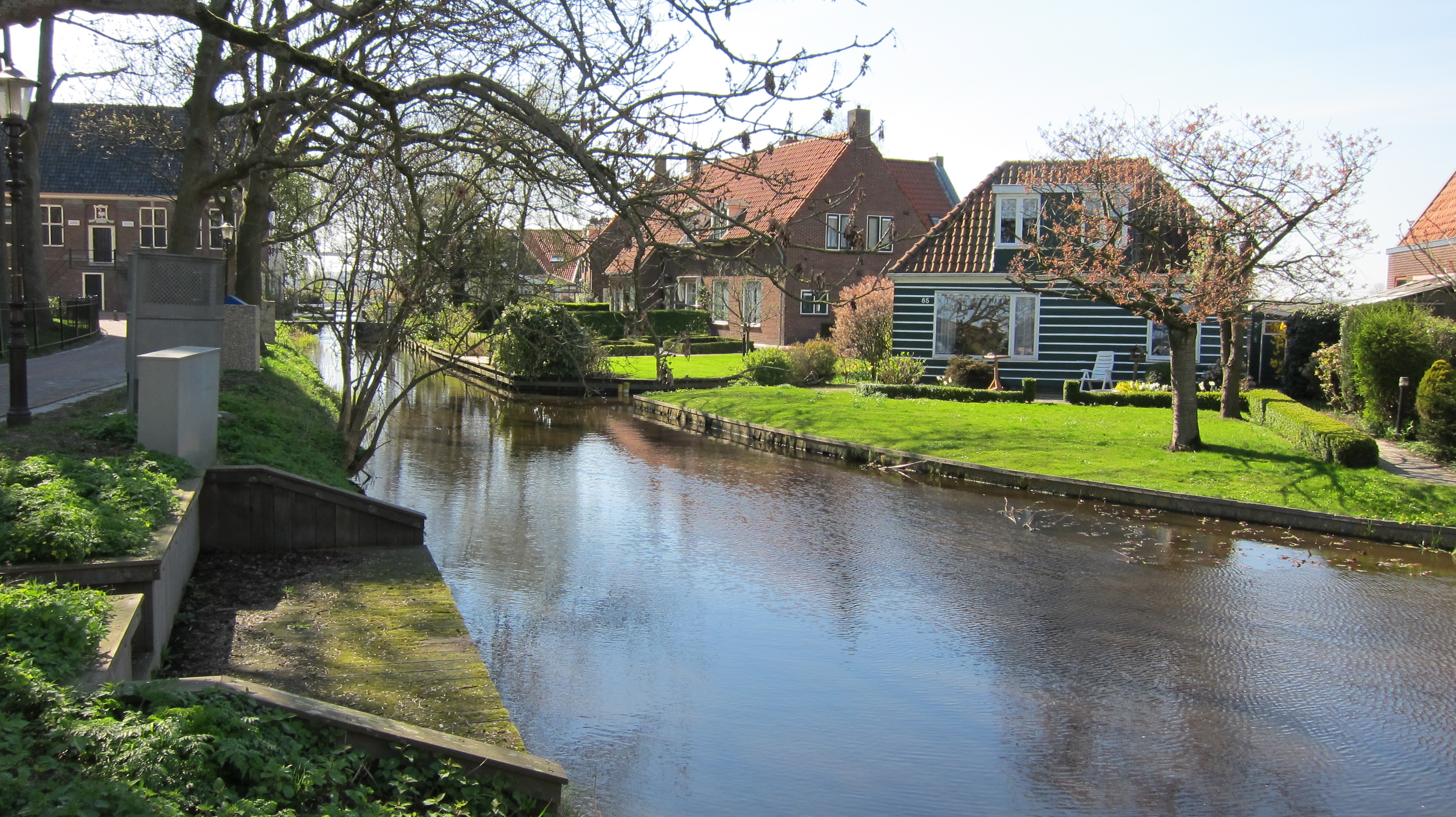
Canal next to the dorpsweg
