= Frans Hin =

Dutch sailor (1906–1968)

Personal information
- Full name: Franciscus Fidelio Joseph Hin
- Nationality: Dutch
- Born: January 29, 1906 Haarlem
- Died: March 6, 1968 (aged 62) Haarlem

Sailing career
- Sport: Sailing
- Club: Haarlemsche Jachtclub
- Class: 12' Dinghy
Medal record
sailing
Representing Netherlands
Gold medal – first place	1920 Ostend and Amsterdam	12' Dinghy
- Updated on 2013-12-23

Franciscus "Frans" Fidelio Joseph Hin (January 29, 1906 Haarlem - March 6, 1968, Haarlem) was a sailor from the Netherlands, who represented his native country at the 1920 Summer Olympics in Ostend, Belgium.

During the second race one of the marks was drifting and the race was abandoned. Since the organizers did not have the time to re-sail the race that week the two remaining races were rescheduled for September 3 of that year. Since both contenders were Dutch, the organizers requested the Dutch Olympic Committee to organize the race in The Netherlands.

With his father Cornelis Hin as helmsmen Hin won the last two races race in The Netherlands on the Buiten IJ, in front of Durgerdam near Amsterdam. His brother Johan Hin crewed the first race in Belgium. Hin took the gold over the combined series with the boat Beatrijs III.

Hin became the youngest man to win a gold medal at the 1920 Olympic games aged 14 years 163 days.

== Sources ==
- "Frans Hin Bio, Stats, and Results". Olympic Sports. Sports-Reference.com. Archived from the original on 2013-12-24.
- "12 Voetsjollen Archief" (PDF). Twaalfvoetsjollenclub. twaalfvoetsjollenclub.nl. Archived from the original (PDF) on 2014-01-02.
- "Olympic Games 1920 – Officiel Report" (PDF). 1957. Archived from the original (PDF) on 2007-09-27.
