= Cornelis Hin =

Dutch sailor (1869–1944)

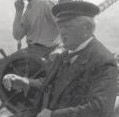

Personal information
- Full name: Cornelis Nicolaas Hin
- Nationality: Dutch
- Born: 6 October 1869 Den Helder, Netherlands
- Died: 21 October 1944 (aged 75) Bloemendaal, Netherlands

Sport

Sailing career
- Class: 12' Dinghy
- Club: Haarlemsche Jachtclub
Medal record
sailing
Representing Netherlands
Gold medal – first place	1920 Ostend and Amsterdam	12' Dinghy
- Updated on 23 December 2013

Cornelis Nicolaas Hin (6 October 1869 – 21 October 1944) was a sailor from the Netherlands, who represented his native country at the 1920 Summer Olympics in Ostend, Belgium.

During the second race one of the marks was drifting and the race was abandoned. Since the organizers did not have the time to re-sail the race that week the two remaining races were rescheduled for September 3 of that year. Since both contenders were Dutch, the organizers requested the Dutch Olympic Committee to organize the race in The Netherlands.

With his son Johan Hin as crew Hin won the first race. His son Frans Hin crewed the remaining races in The Netherlands on the Buiten IJ, in front of Durgerdam near Amsterdam. Hin took the gold over the combined series with his boat Beatrijs III.

== Sources ==
- "Cornelis Hin Bio, Stats, and Results". Olympic Sports. Sports-Reference.com. Archived from the original on 2013-12-24.
- "12 Voetsjollen Archief" (PDF). Twaalfvoetsjollenclub. twaalfvoetsjollenclub.nl. Archived from the original (PDF) on 2014-01-02.
- "Olympic Games 1920 – Officiel Report" (PDF). 1957. Archived from the original (PDF) on 2007-09-27.
