= Hinn =

Hinn is a surname. Notable people with the surname include:

- Benny Hinn (born 1952), Israeli-born televangelist
- Christopher Hinn (1855–1926), American politician

Hinn can also refer to:

- Hinn, legendary creature

== See also ==
- Hin (disambiguation)
