= Arnoud van der Biesen =

Dutch sailor (1899–1968)

Personal information
- Full name: Arnoud Eugène van der Biesen
- Nationality: Dutch
- Born: 28 December 1899 Semarang
- Died: 17 February 1968 (aged 68) The Hague

Sport

Sailing career
- Class: 12' Dinghy
Medal record
Sailing
Representing Netherlands
Olympic Games
Silver medal – second place	1920 Ostend and Amsterdam	12' Dinghy
- Updated on 2013-12-24

Arnoud Eugène van der Biesen (28 December 1899 Semarang, Dutch East Indies - 17 February 1968, The Hague) was a sailor from the Netherlands, who represented his native country at the 1920 Summer Olympics in Ostend, Belgium.

During the second race one of the marks was drifting and the race was abandoned. Since the organizers did not have the time to re-sail the race that week the two remaining races were rescheduled for 3 September of that year. Since both contenders were Dutch, the organizers requested the Dutch Olympic Committee to organize the race in The Netherlands.

With Petrus Beukers as crew, Van der Biesen took the silver over the combined series with the boat Boreas.

== Sources ==
- "Arnoud van der Biesen Bio, Stats, and Results". Olympic Sports. Sports-Reference.com. Archived from the original on 18 April 2020.
- "Olympic Games 1920 – Officiel Report" (PDF). 1957. Archived from the original (PDF) on 27 September 2007.
