= Marjolein Moorman =

Dutch scientist and politician (born 1974)

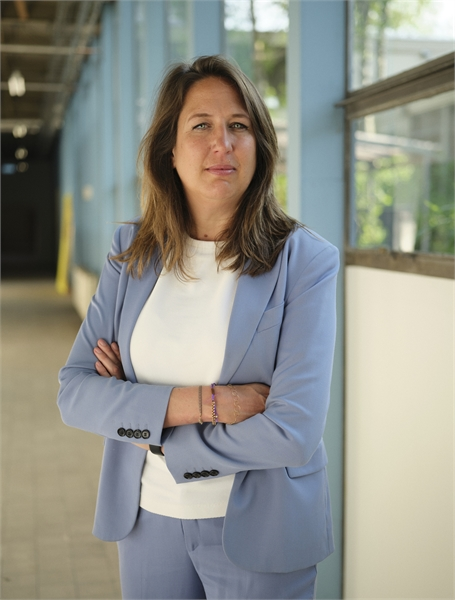
- Moorman in 2023

Third Deputy Speaker of the House of Representatives
- Incumbent
- Assumed office 20 November 2025
- Preceded by: Thom van Campen

Member of the House of Representatives
- Incumbent
- Assumed office 12 November 2025

Alderwoman in Amsterdam
- In office 30 May 2018 – 11 November 2025
- President: Femke Halsema

Member of the Amsterdam Municipal Council
- In office 3 March 2010 – 30 May 2018

Personal details
- Born: 1 March 1974 (age 52) Wassenaar, Netherlands
- Party: PRO (2026–present)
- Spouse: Harmen van der Veen
- Children: 2

Marjolein Moorman (born 1 March 1974) is a Dutch communications scientist, politician and administrator. She is a member of PRO. She has been a member of the Tweede Kamer since 2025.

== Career ==
=== Scientific career ===
Moorman attended pre-university education (vwo) at the Rijnlands Lyceum Foundation until 1993, studied communication studies at the University of Amsterdam until 1997 and obtained her PhD on scientific promotion on 3 October 2003 with her thesis Context considered: the relationship between media environments and advertising effects. Her supervisor was PC Neijens. From 1990 to 1996 she worked as a research assistant at the Institute for Medical Statistics in The Hague.

From 1997 onwards Moorman held various positions at the Amsterdam School of Communications Research, from 1997 to 2003 as a PhD candidate, from 2001 to 2009 as a University lecturer, from 2009 to 2011 as an Associate Professor of persuasive technology, and from 2011 to 2018 as an associate professor of Government communication. From 2010 to 2018, she was also chair of the Examination Board of the Department of Communication Science.

In addition, Moorman worked at the communication consultancy and advertising agency Kobalt in Amstelveen from 2004, from 2004 to 2005 as a researchmanager and from 2005 to 2006 as a research consultant. From 2006 to 2010 she was director of the Foundation for Scientific Research into Commercial Communication (SWOCC).

=== Political career ===
Moorman was a member of the Amsterdam city council from 2010 to 2018. In this position, she served on the Labour Party's parliamentary group board from 2010, as Vicevoorzitter from 2011 to 2012, and as parliamentary group chair from 2012 to 2018. She was also spokesperson for education, local media, general affairs, safety & public order, prostitution, refugees, housing, and spatial planning, among other areas, and was a member of the regional council of the Amsterdam City Region from 2010 to 2012.

In May 2018 Moorman became alderman for education, adult education, low literacy and integration, preschool, childcare and after-school facilities, poverty and debt counseling, and the Zuidoost district. In June 2022, she became alderman for education, youth (care), poverty and debt counseling, the Zuidoost master plan, and the coordination of social services. She also became first deputy mayor.

In April 2022, Moorman, together with fellow party member Frans Timmermans, advocated further cooperation with GroenLinks. For GroenLinks-PvdA, she was on the list for the regions of Amsterdam, Haarlem, and Den Helder for the 2023 Dutch general election. For the 2025 Dutch general election, she is in sixth place on the GroenLinks-PvdA candidate list.

On 25 November 2025, Marjolein Moorman was nominated as the third deputy speaker of the House of Representatives by her party.

=== Secondary functions ===
In addition to his position as alderman, Moorman became an author at Ambo | Anthos publishers, chairman of the board of trustees of the Wiardi Beckman Stichting and chairman of the supervisory board of the Stichting De Schrijverscentrale.

== Publications ==
- 2022: Rood in Wassenaar, Ambo | Anthos uitgevers, ISBN 9789026357077.

=== Bestseller 60 ===
Books with listings in the Dutch Bestseller 60	Year of publication	Date of entry	Highest position	Number of weeks	Comments
Red in Wassenaar	2022	09-02-2022	60	1	

== Personal life ==
Moorman is married and has two daughters.

== See also ==
- List of candidates in the 2025 Dutch general election
