= Henri Fivaz =

Swiss sailor

Personal information
- Nationality: Swiss

Sailing career
- Sport: Sailing
- Club: Lausanne
- Class: 12' Dinghy
Competition record
Sailing
Representing Switzerland
Olympic Games
1928 Amsterdam	12' Dinghy
- Updated on 20 March 2015

Henri Fivaz was a sailor from Switzerland who represented his country at the 1928 Summer Olympics in Amsterdam, Netherlands.

== Sources ==
- "Henri Fivaz Bio, Stats, and Results". Olympic Sports. Sports-Reference.com. Archived from the original on 2 April 2015.
