= Petrus Beukers =

Dutch sailor (1899–1981)

Personal information
- Full name: Petrus Bernardus Beukers
- Nationality: Dutch
- Born: 9 October 1899 Amsterdam
- Died: 12 April 1981 (aged 81) Schaijk

Sailing career
- Sport: Sailing
- Class: 12' Dinghy
Medal record
sailing
Representing Netherlands
Silver medal – second place	1920 Ostend and Amsterdam	12' Dinghy
- Updated on 2013-12-24

Petrus Bernardus Beukers (9 October 1899 in Amsterdam – 12 April 1981 in Schaijk) was a sailor from the Netherlands, who represented his native country at the 1920 Summer Olympics in Ostend, Belgium.

During the second race one of the marks was drifting and the race was abandoned. Since the organizers did not have the time to re-sail the race that week the two remaining races were rescheduled for 3 September of that year. Since both contenders were Dutch, the organizers requested the Dutch Olympic Committee to organize the race in The Netherlands.

With Arnoud van der Biesen as helmsman, Beukers took the silver over the combined series with the boat Boreas.

== Sources ==
- "Petrus Beukers Bio, Stats, and Results". Olympic Sports. Sports-Reference.com. Archived from the original on 18 April 2020.
- "Olympic Games 1920 – Officiel Report" (PDF). 1957. Archived from the original (PDF) on 27 September 2007.
