= Holysloot =

- Village
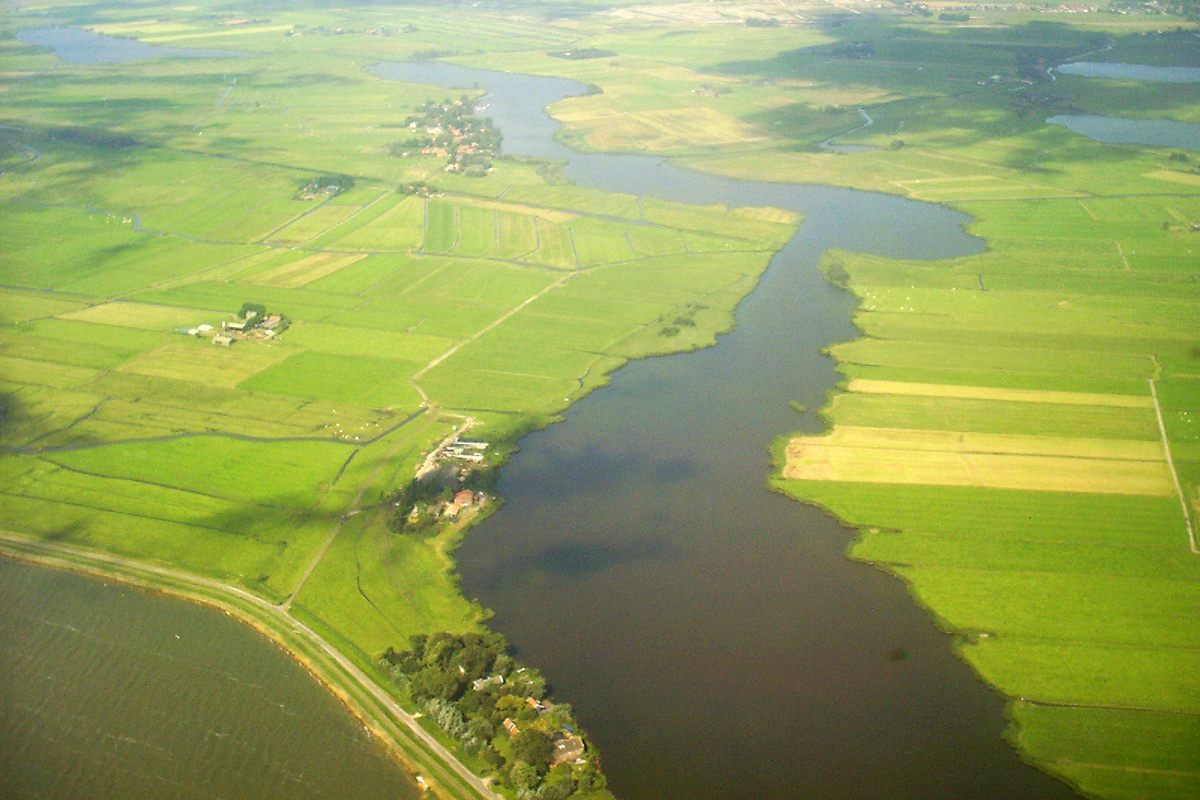
- Holysloot aan het Holysloter Die

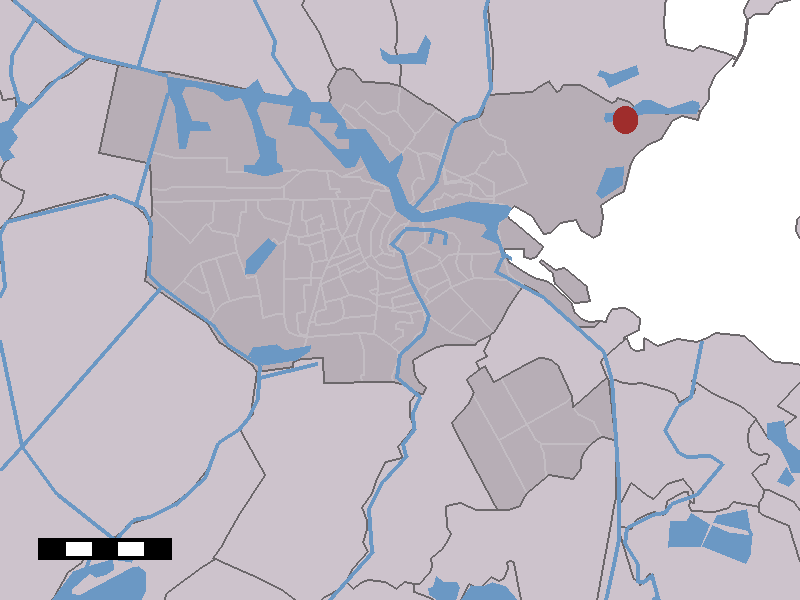
- Holysloot in the municipality of Amsterdam.
- Coordinates: 52°25′N 5°2′E
- Country: Netherlands
- Province: North Holland
- Municipality: Amsterdam
- Time zone: UTC+1 (CET)
  - Summer (DST): UTC+2 (CEST)

Holysloot is a village in the Dutch province of North Holland. It is a part of the municipality of Amsterdam, and lies about 9 km northeast of the city centre. The name Holysloot probably derives from an expression for a "low-lying area at a ditch". Holysloot is a part of the deelgemeente (sub-municipality) Amsterdam-Noord. The village has about 160 inhabitants.

== History ==
Holysloot was first mentioned in the thirteenth century when Floris V, Count of Holland granted privileges to the hamlet. The hamlet has only one street running through it and was opined in 1988 to have no more houses than it did three centuries prior, despite being within visual distance of Amsterdam. The design of the houses in Holysloot are viewed to have inspired farmhouses constructed by the Dutch settlers in New Amsterdam.

Holysloot was a separate municipality between 1 May 1817 and 1 January 1818, when it was merged with Ransdorp. Due to a flood in 1916 and the municipality being unable to afford recovery plans, Holysloot as well as the nearby Zunderdorp and Schellingwoude, requested to be annexed by the city of Amsterdam. This integration was completed by 1921.

== Church ==
By 1342, Holysloot had its own chapel with services being held by the pastor of Ransdorp. By 1520, it had been granted its own status as an independent parish. The church has the smallest graveyard in North Holland at 150 square metres. Until 1841, the burials occurred within the boundary walls of the church. When the church was expanded in 1846, the existing gravesites were maintained.

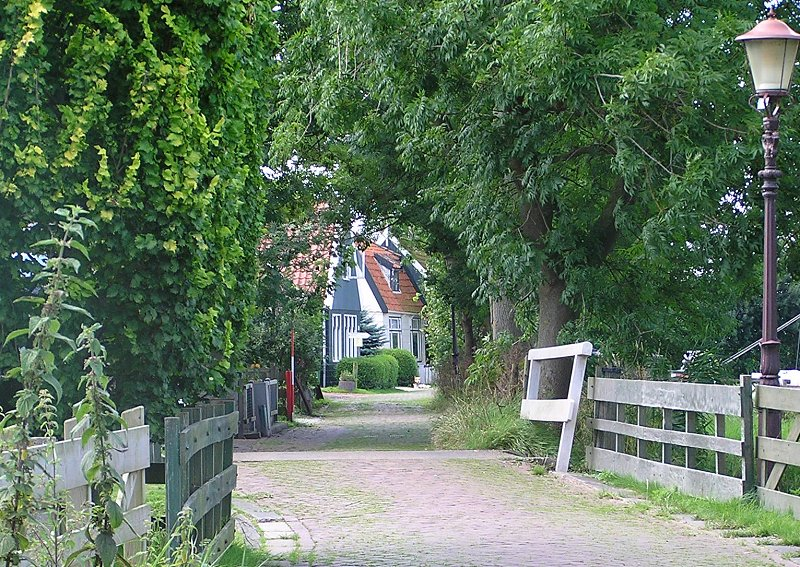
Streetscape in Holysloot
