= Johan Hin =

Dutch sailor (1899–1957)

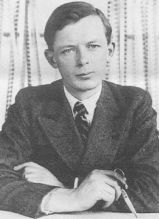

Personal information
- Full name: Johannes Jozef Antonius Hin
- Nationality: Dutch
- Born: January 3, 1899 Haarlem
- Died: June 29, 1957 (aged 58) Haarlem

Sport

Sailing career
- Class(es): 12' Dinghy; French National Monotype
- Club: Haarlemsche Jachtclub
Medal record
sailing
Representing Netherlands
Gold medal – first place	1920 Ostend and Amsterdam	12' Dinghy
- Updated on 2013-12-24

Johannes "Johan" Jozef Antonius Hin (January 3, 1899 Haarlem – June 29, 1957 Haarlem) was a sailor from the Netherlands who represented his native country at the 1920 Summer Olympics in Ostend, Belgium.

During the second race one of the marks was drifting and the race was abandoned. The organizers did not have time to re-sail the race that week, and so the two remaining races were rescheduled for September 3 of that year. Because both contenders were Dutch, the organizers requested that the Dutch Olympic Committee hold the race in the Netherlands.

With his father Cornelis Hin as helmsmen, Hin won the first race. His brother Frans Hin crewed the remaining races in the Netherlands on the Buiten IJ, in front of Durgerdam near Amsterdam. Hin took the gold over the combined series with the boat Beatrijs III.

In the 1924 Olympics, Hin took part in the French National Monotype and took 5th place.

Later Hin went to a monastery. There he specialized in making documentary films. His first films had sailing as topic.

== Sources ==
- "Johan Hin Bio, Stats, and Results". Olympic Sports. Sports-Reference.com. Archived from the original on 2013-10-20.
- "12 Voetsjollen Archief" (PDF). Twaalfvoetsjollenclub. twaalfvoetsjollenclub.nl. Archived from the original (PDF) on 2014-01-02.
- "Olympic Games 1920 – Officiel Report" (PDF). 1957. Archived from the original (PDF) on 2007-09-27.
- "Les Jeux de la VIIIe Olympiade Paris 1924:rapport official" (PDF) (in French). Paris: Librairie de France: Comité Olympique Français. 1924. Archived from the original (PDF) on 2013-04-21.
