= Sven Thorell =

Swedish sailor

Personal information
- Born: 18 February 1888 Stockholm, Sweden
- Died: 29 April 1974 (aged 86) Bromma, Stockholm, Sweden

Sailing career
- Sport: Sailing
- Club: SSS, Stockholm
Medal record
Sailing
Representing Sweden
Olympic Games
Gold medal – first place	1928 Amsterdam	12 foot dinghy

Sven Gustav Thorell (18 February 1888 – 29 April 1974) was a Swedish sailor who competed in the mixed one-person dinghy event at the 1928 and 1932 Summer Olympics. He won the gold medal in 1928 and finished ninth in 1932. In 1933–34 Thorell was president of the Swedish Canoe Federation.
