= Bertel Broman =

Finnish sailor

Olympic medal record

Men's Sailing
| Bronze medal – third place | 1928 Amsterdam | 12 foot dinghy |

Bertel Broman (21 August 1889 – 11 May 1952) was a Finnish sailor who competed in the 1928 Summer Olympics.
