= Zunderdorp =

- Village
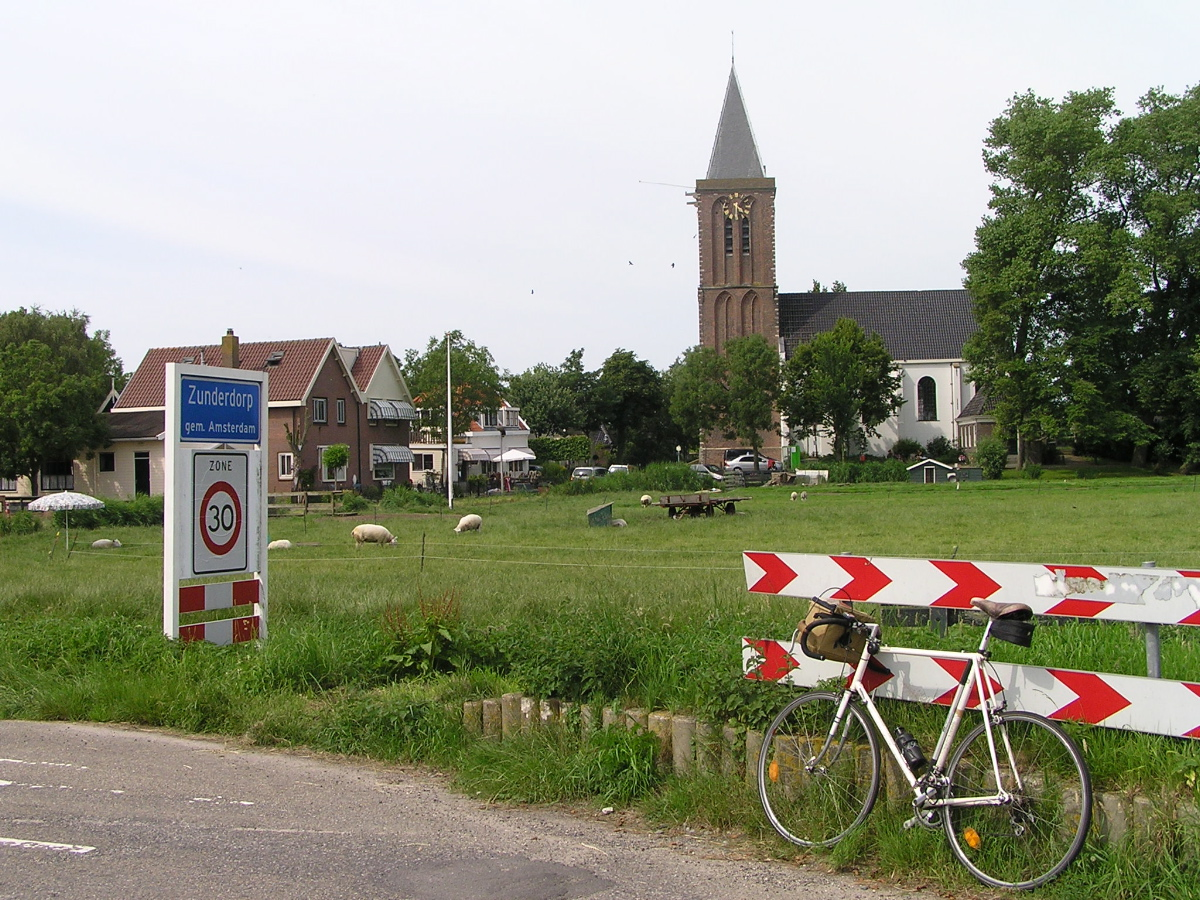
- Zunderdorp, July 2005

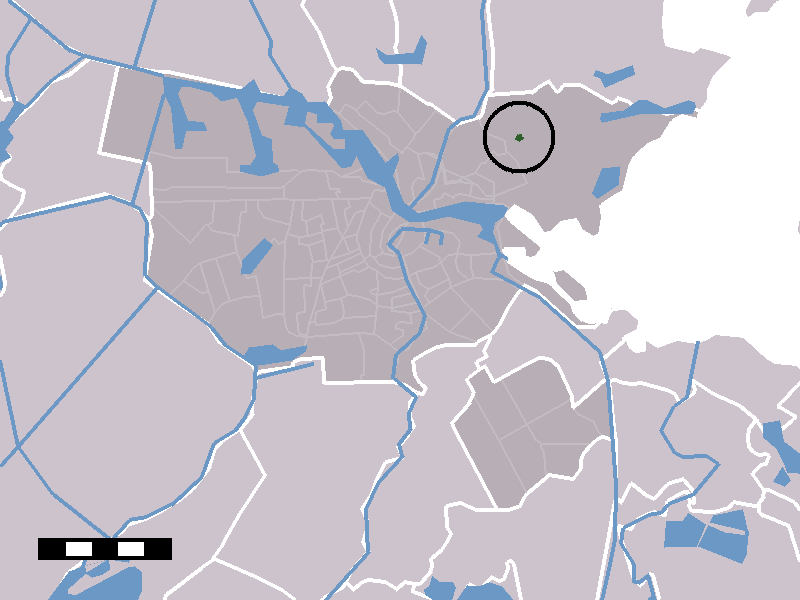
- Zunderdorp in the municipality of Amsterdam.
- Coordinates: 52°24′26″N 4°57′58″E
- Country: Netherlands
- Province: North Holland
- Municipality: Amsterdam

Population (2001)
  - Total: 237
- Time zone: UTC+1 (CET)
  - Summer (DST): UTC+2 (CEST)

Zunderdorp (Dutch pronunciation: [ˈzʏndərˌdɔr(ə)p]) is a town in the Dutch province of North Holland. It is a part of the municipality of Amsterdam, and lies about 7 km northeast of Amsterdam.

In 2001, the town of Zunderdorp had 237 inhabitants. The built-up area of the town was 0.05 km^{2}, and contained 91 residences. The village is a part of the deelgemeente (sub-municipality or borough) Amsterdam-Noord.
