= Durgerdam =

- Village
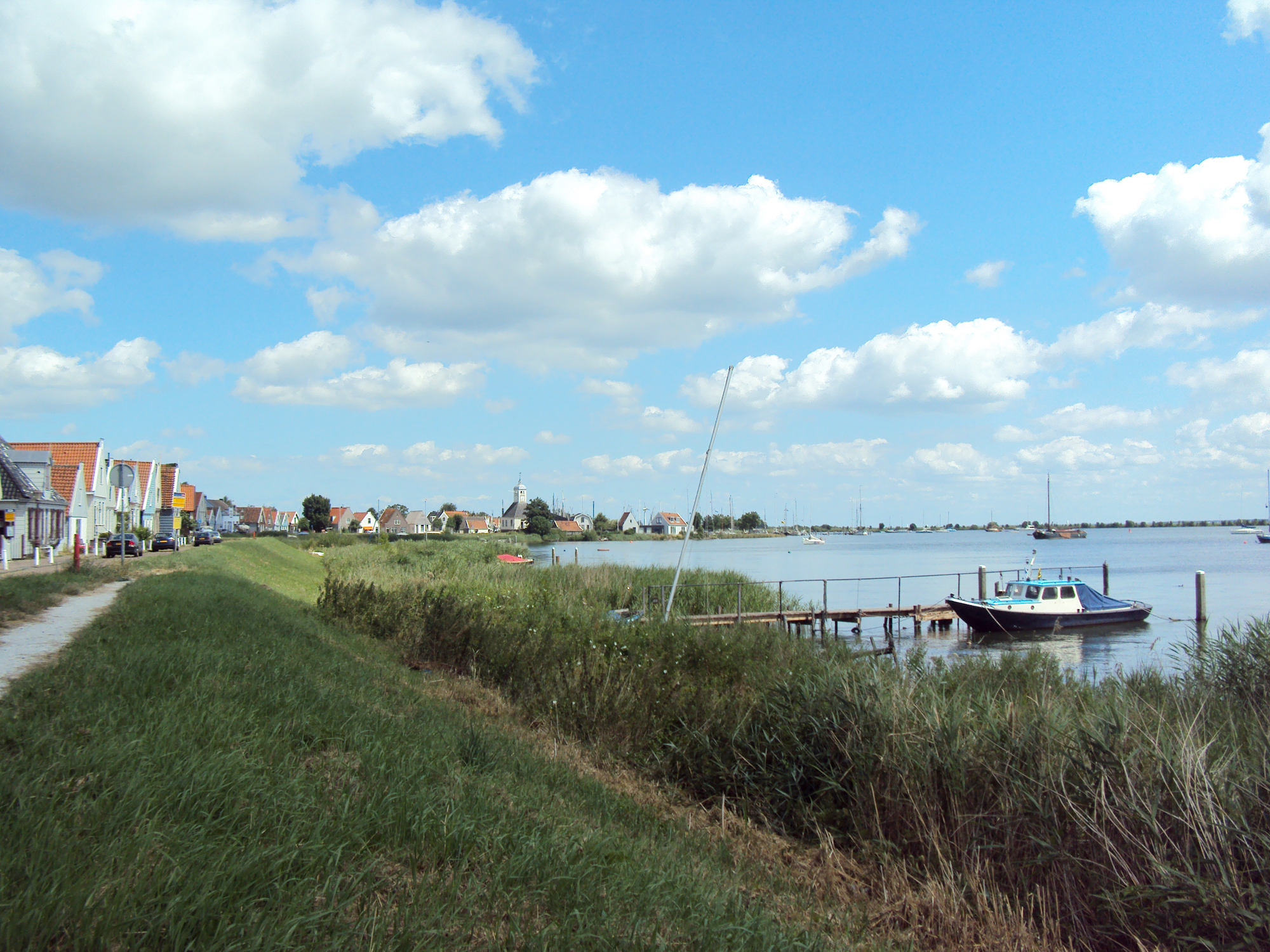
- Durgerdam

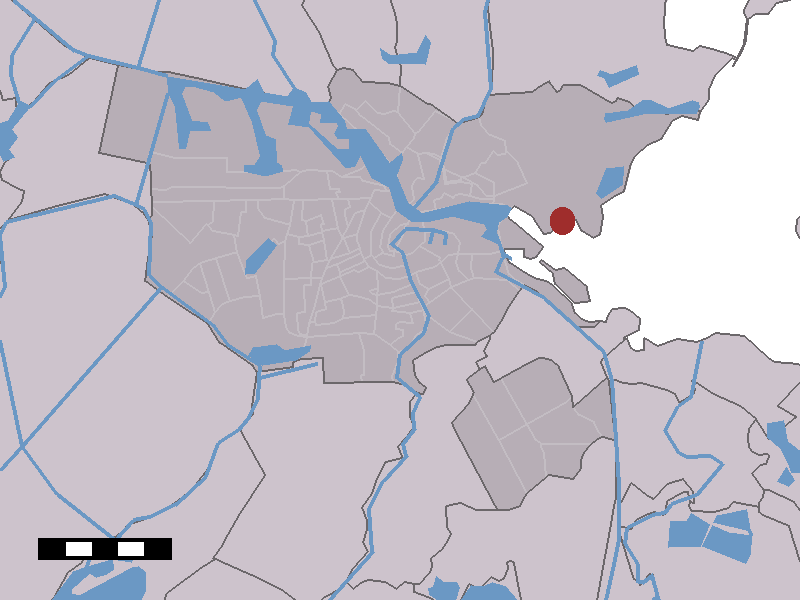
- Durgerdam in the municipality of Amsterdam.
- Coordinates: 52°23′N 4°59′E
- Country: Netherlands
- Province: North Holland
- Municipality: Amsterdam
- Time zone: UTC+1 (CET)
  - Summer (DST): UTC+2 (CEST)

Durgerdam is a village in the Dutch province of North Holland. It is a part of the municipality of Amsterdam, and lies about 7 km east of the city centre, along the dyke of the IJmeer.

Durgerdam is a part of the deelgemeente (sub-municipality) Amsterdam-Noord. The village has about 430 inhabitants.

Durgerdam was a separate municipality between 1 May 1817, and 1 January 1818, when it was merged with Ransdorp.

Durgerdam hosted the second "Pit Stop" on The Amazing Race 12, a reality television show that circles the globe.

There is song about the Durgerdam written by Jeroen Zjilstraa, called "Durgerdam sleeps". The song appeared on their 2002 album Tussen Den Oever en New York. In 2003, the song was released as the only single from the album.
