= 12 foot dinghy =

Type of sailboat

12' Dinghy

Development
- Designer: George Cockshott
- Location: United Kingdom
- Year: 1912
- Design: One-Design

Boat
- Crew: 1 or 2
- Draft: 0.92 m (3 ft 0 in)

Hull
- Type: Monohull
- Construction: Clinker (Original); GRP (modern)
- Hull weight: 104 kg (229 lb)
- LOA: 3.66 m (12.0 ft)
- Beam: 1.43 m (4 ft 8 in)

Hull appendages
- Keel: Centerplate

Rig
- Rig type: Standing lug

Sails
- Mainsail area: 9.3 m^{2} (100 sq ft)

Rating
- D-PN: SW 103

The Twelve Foot Dinghy was designed by George Cockshott, an amateur boat designer from Southport, England in response to a 1912 design contest. It became the first one-design racing dinghy to achieve international recognition. The class was granted the 'International' status by the IYRU in 1919 and remained this status until 1964 when it was revoked by the same authority. The class was selected as the dinghy class for the Olympics in 1920 & 1928. In 1924 the French wanted to use an alternate French design.

== Boat Racing Association (B.R.A.) ==
In 1913 there was published in England a new rating rule for yachts of all sizes. The rule was prepared by the self -styled 'Boat Racing Association' under the chairmanship of Lt. Col. J. T. Bucknill at a meeting in November 1912. B.R.A. felt that ordinary racing sailors were not catered for by the YRA (Yacht Racing Association) rating rules. Initially there was to be a class of 18 footer rating, which was to be smaller than a 6m. Other sizes of yachts were intended to follow, including a 12-foot and a 20 foot.

The B.R.A. rating formula was: Rating in feet= (Length + Square root of sail area) divided by 4 + (length x square root of sail area) divided by 3 x cube root of weight.

The class is known in some quarters as '(Section 5) The International One-Design 12 Foot Dinghy Class' as it is the smallest and 5th design approved by the International Conference of Nations held in 1919.

== The Future of the Class ==
Since the revoking of the International status the 12 foot Dinghy became a National class in many countries. This however resulted in deviations in the class rules between the different Nationalities. In 2006 the foundation of the international association were laid at a meeting in the Hotel Jolanda, Portofino, Italy this was followed by another meeting in Tuzla, Turkey in October 2007. During this time much progress has been made towards re-establishing the 12' Dinghy as a truly international class. However this had not resulted in a single set of class rules so far.

The 12 feet dinghy is one of the Vintage Yachting Classes at the 2018 Vintage Yachting Games in Copenhagen.

In June 2020 Lough Ree Yacht Club in Ireland had planned to celebrate their 250th. centenary with a Clinkerfest regatta including International 12 foot dinghies from Netherlands, and Germany but Government Covid regulations prevented it from taking place.

Also in 2020 the centenary regatta in Ostende to commemorate 100 years since the first Olympic regatta for dinghies was postponed for the same reason.

== The World Dinghy Championships ==
In 1924, The Brussels Royal Yacht Club held the first World Dinghy Championships.

- Belgium
- England
- France
- The Netherlands
- Irish Free State (Winner)
- Italy.

In 1925, The Royal Munster Yacht Club held the second World Dinghy Championships in Crosshaven, Co. Cork, Irish Free State.

- Mr. Watney GBR
- Mr. Bokre NED
- Mr. Van Haltern BEL
- Capt. Payne IRL(winner)

== Wall of Fame ==
=== Olympic Games ===
Rank	Nation	Gold	Silver	Bronze	Total
1	Netherlands	1	1	0	2
2	Sweden	1	0	0	1
3	Norway	0	1	0	1
4	Finland	0	0	1	1
Totals (4 entries)		2	2	1	5

Games	Gold	Silver	Bronze
1920 Antwerp	Netherlands (NED); Cornelis Hin; Johan Hin; Frans Hin	Netherlands (NED); Arnoud van der Biesen; Petrus Beukers	No further competitors
1928 Amsterdam	Sweden (SWE); Sven Thorell	Norway (NOR); Henrik Robert	Finland (FIN); Bertil Broman

=== Vintage Yachting Games ===
Vintage	Gold	Silver	Bronze
2018 Copenhagen			

=== Cockshott Trophy ===
Rank	Nation	Gold	Silver	Bronze	Total
1	Italy (ITA)	2	2	0	4
2	Netherlands (NED)	0	0	2	2
Totals (2 entries)		2	2	2	6

Event	Gold	Silver	Bronze
2009	Italy (ITA); Giorgio Pizzarello	Italy (ITA); Stefano Pizzarello	Netherlands (NED); Fred Udo
2010	Italy (ITA); Uberto Capannoli	Italy (ITA); Giorgio Pizzarello	Netherlands (NED); Pieter Bleeker
2011	Netherlands (NED); Pieter Bleeker	Italy (ITA); Uberto Capannoli	Netherlands (NED); Duud Dudok Van Heel

== The Alternative Designs ==
Following the success of the George Cockshott design, there was a suggestion in 1920 that the Cockshott design be replaced by a (superior?) design by Frank Morgan Giles, who suggested that his design was superior to the design created by Cockshott who was a mere amateur. Morgan Giles persuaded the British that his design was superior, but he was unable to convince the Dutch or Italians.

=== Dublin Bay 12 footer (DBSC) ===
Due to the type of short steep waves which occur in Dublin Bay, Ireland, some owners of the Dun Laoghaire International 12 footers under the recommendation of J.J. O'Leary, modified the design in the 1960s to reduce the amount of water taken over the bow. They modified the design by putting a small foredeck with washboards, inserting a new mast step aft of the existing step, cutting a circular hole in the forward thwart, moving the mast aft, shortening the boom, cutting down the size of the mainsail, and hoisting a small jib borrowed from the other Dublin Bay classic dinghy class the Water Wag. The modification was declared a success, and the modified fleet sailed and raced for about another 10 years. No alterations were made to the hull, or underwater appendages - so the alterations should be reversible.

=== The Irish Championships ===
In the 1920s till the 1950s there were fleets in Royal Munster Yacht Club, Sutton Dinghy Club, Howth, Baltimore, Clontarf Yacht and Boat Club, and Seapoint Boat Club. The first 'International Dinghy Championship' was held by the Royal Munster Yacht Club in Cork Harbour on 12, 13 and 14 August 1925.

In 2011 the first Irish combined DBSC 12 foot and int. 12 foot Championships for at least 40 years was held at the Royal St George Yacht Club. Boats of the International Design and the Dublin Bay rig sailed against each other as equals in 2011, which was won by Gail Varian in a DBSC rigged boat.

In 2015 in Dun Laoghaire harbour and in the waters outside the harbour, the second Irish championship of recent years took place under the Royal St. George Yacht Club burgee on 30 August. George Miller in 'Pixie' an Internationally rigged boat won overall.

The following year the event in Dun Laoghaire harbour, which was part of the National Heritage Week, was sailed in light weather, and showed that the DBSC boat was capable of pointing higher upwind, but being considerably slower downwind. The Irish championship winner was the DBSC 12 Sgadan owned by David Sarratt and crewed by Gail Varian.

In 2018 George Miller in 'Pixie' repeated his 2015 win despite completing race three with a jury rig. Miller dominated again in 2019.

in 2021 the 12 foot dinghies were joined by an earlier (1896) 12 foot design, The Bray Droleen, for the Irish Championships. The Droleen is an American style catboat designed by William Ogilvy.

=== Clinkerfest ===
In 2020 Athlone Yacht Club/ Lough Ree Yacht Club planned to celebrate 250 years of leisure sailing and one of the chief events was to be 'Clinkerfest', a celebration of the Clinker built boats introduced in Ireland by the Vikings 1000 years ago. Racing for International 12 footers, Water Wags, IDRA 14s, Mermaids, Colleens and of course Shannon ODs. Was intended. The event was postponed for one year in compliance with Covid regulations.
