= Richard Taite =

Richard Taite or Tait may refer to:

- Richard Taite (cricketer) (1911–1969), English first-class cricketer and British Army officer
- Richard Tait (born 1947), British journalist and academic
- Richard Tait (game designer), (1964–2022), Scottish-born American board game designer
- Richard Tait (footballer) (born 1989), Scottish footballer

== See also ==
- Richard Tate, character in the 2011 British TV drama series Outcasts
- Honest Dick Tate (1831–c. 1890), American politician in Kentucky
