= History of Amsterdam =

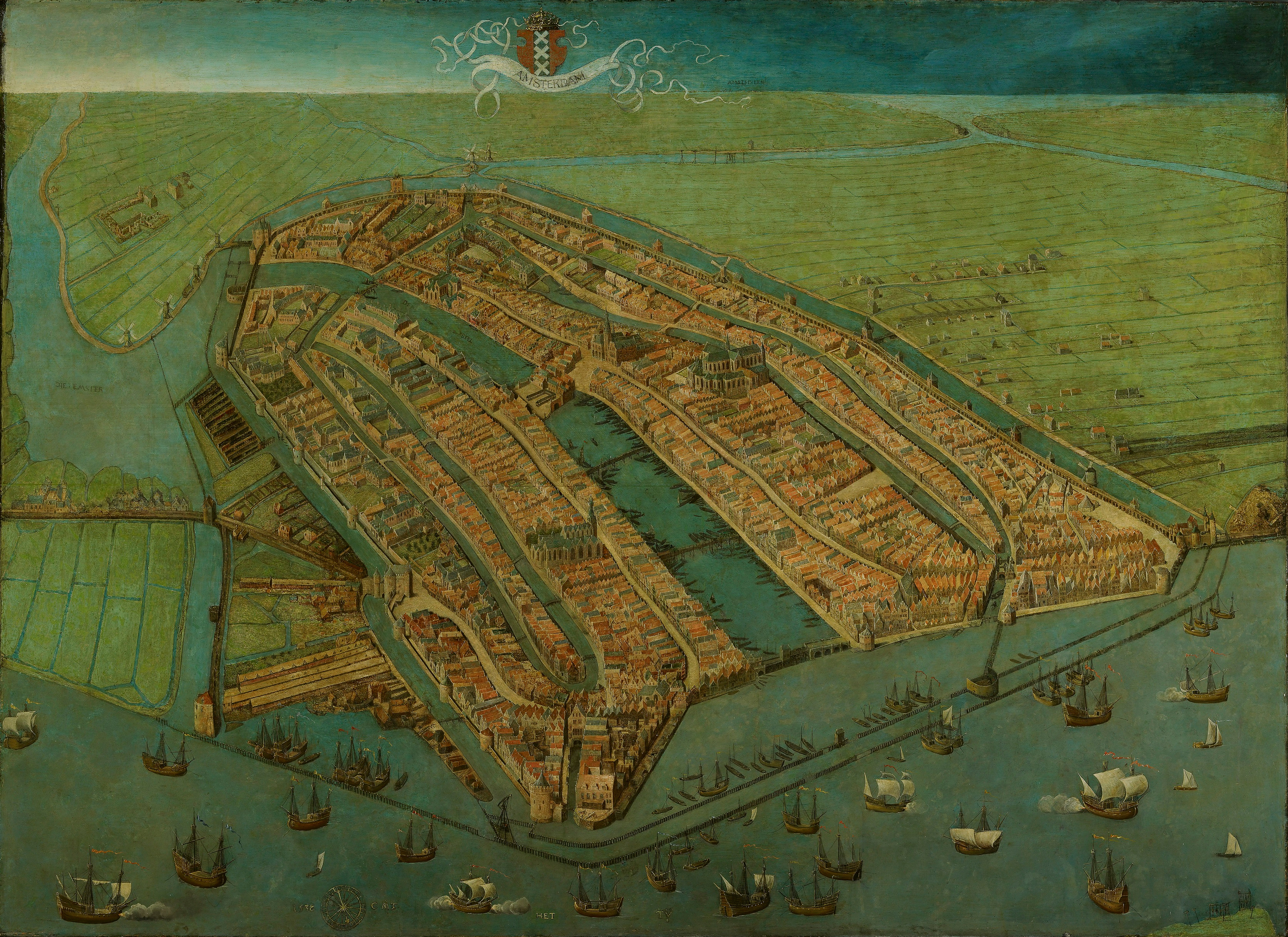
Amsterdam drawn from the IJ in 1538, by Cornelis Anthoniszoon. This is the oldest city map of Amsterdam. It shows the completed medieval city with defensive wall and gates.

Amsterdam has a long and eventful history. The origins of the city lie around 1000 CE, when inhabitants settled at the mouth of the Amstel and began peatland reclamation. After the All Saints' Flood (1170), a dam was built in the Amstel to protect the lower lands from floods.

In 1275, Amsterdam was granted a toll privilege by Count Floris V which exempted it from a bridge toll. This made Amsterdam popular for international traders to sell goods at lower prices. During the Middle Ages, it developed into one of the largest trading cities in the world. The 17th century was a Golden Age, Amsterdam was the most important trading hub in Europe and the leading financial center of the western world. Amsterdam is colloquially called the "Venice of the North" for its numerous canals. It is also ranked as a top sin city due to the adult entertainment. As the capital city of the Netherlands, it is the largest with over 930,000 inhabitants in 2024.

== Toponymy ==
The oldest document referring to the settlement of Dutch: Amestelledamme, lit. 'dam in the Amstel' comes from a document dated 27 October 1275 CE. Inhabitants of the village were, by this document, exempted from paying a bridge toll in the County of Holland by Count Floris V.

The old charters that are preserved in the IJzeren Kapel mention 18 different spellings of the name Amsterdam. In chronological order from 1275 till 1596: Amestelledamme, Aemstelredamme, Amestelredamme, Amstelredam, Aemsterdam (1389), Aemstelredam, Amstelredamme, Aemsterdamme, Amstredamme, Amsterdam (1440), Ampsterdam, Amstredam, Amsterdamme, Aemstredam, Haemsterdam, Amsterledam, Ambsterdam, Ambstelredam.

The Amstel river was also called Goudewater. Goude means gouwe, 't gouwewater is the river that flows through the gouw. This water belonged to the Lord and later the Count. The Count gave the water in perpetual leasehold to the city in 1389. The city donated in 1480 the visscherij (fishery) to the handen voetboogschutters (hands foot archers) whom returned it to the city in the middle of the 17th century. The name changed from Goudewater to Guldewater. The fishery in the Rokin, the Binnen-Amstel and Buiten-Amstel till the veer (ferry) at Meerhuizen (now Meerhuizenplein) were leased under this name.

== Prehistory ==
Excavations between 2005 and 2012 found evidence that the origins of Amsterdam are much older than the 12th century. During the construction of the Metro Line 52 (aka Noord/Zuidlijn) archaeologists discovered many objects from the bottom of the Amstel river, where the Damrak and Rokin are now located. Some 30 meters below street level, archeologists found pole-axes, a stone hammer, shards of Bell Beaker culture pottery under Rokin (2200–2000 BCE) and a granite grinding stone under Damrak (2700–2750 BCE). Many objects date from the Neolithic era (up to 4600 years ago), and the Roman era (circa 2000 years ago).

This means Amsterdam, or its predecessor, had human habitation since about 2600 BCE. However, these settlements were probably semi-permanent or seasonal, because the Amstel's river mouth and the banks were too wet for permanent habitation.

== Middle Ages ==
=== Settlement at the Amstel (1000-1250) ===
Amsterdam proper began when the first inhabitants settled at the mouth of the Amstel river around 1000 CE. These were not day laborers who returned to their old area after work. According to historical geographer Chris de Bont, they probably moved into the peatland in search of a new existence and went to the mouth of the IJ because they had to fight for usable land in the coastal dunes and the Gooi area of Holland. Parts of the rivers Amstel and Zaan were dug. Between 800 and 1000 CE the IJ was not a river, but a swampy peat mass.

The marshy area called Amestelle was gradually reclaimed. Drainage ditches were dug on either side of various existing peat streams and a farming community of land reclaimers emerged. When the peat began to subside as a result of drainage, dikes had to be built to protect the now lower-lying land from the water. The construction of dikes along the Amstel was the final stage of peat extraction. The catastrophic All Saints' Flood (1170) overflowed large parts of the Northern Netherlands. The Amestelle area gained an open connection to the sea, and a dam was built in the Amstel to protect the land from future floods.

The people living along the banks of the Amstel built a bridge across the waterway near the IJ, which was a large saltwater inlet connected to the Zuiderzee. Wooden locks under the bridge served as a dam protecting the village from floods by the rising waters of the IJ. The mouth of the river Amstel (present Damrak) formed a natural harbor, which became important for transferring cargo from seagoing kogge ships into smaller vessels that carried the merchandise deeper into the hinterland.

The ecclesiastical jurisdiction of Amestelle was established around 1100. The bishop of Utrecht needed an official to exercise jurisdiction on his behalf and to collect the obligatory levies in the new deanery. This task was given to Wolfgerus van Amstel (1075–1131), who acted in 1105 as a scultetus (schout) of Amestelle (Amstelland). Wolfgerus was a servant of Burchard (bishop of Utrecht). His son Egbert van Amstel (1105–1172) built a small castle or keep (fortified manor house) in Ouderkerk aan de Amstel.

=== Struggle for power (1200-1318) ===
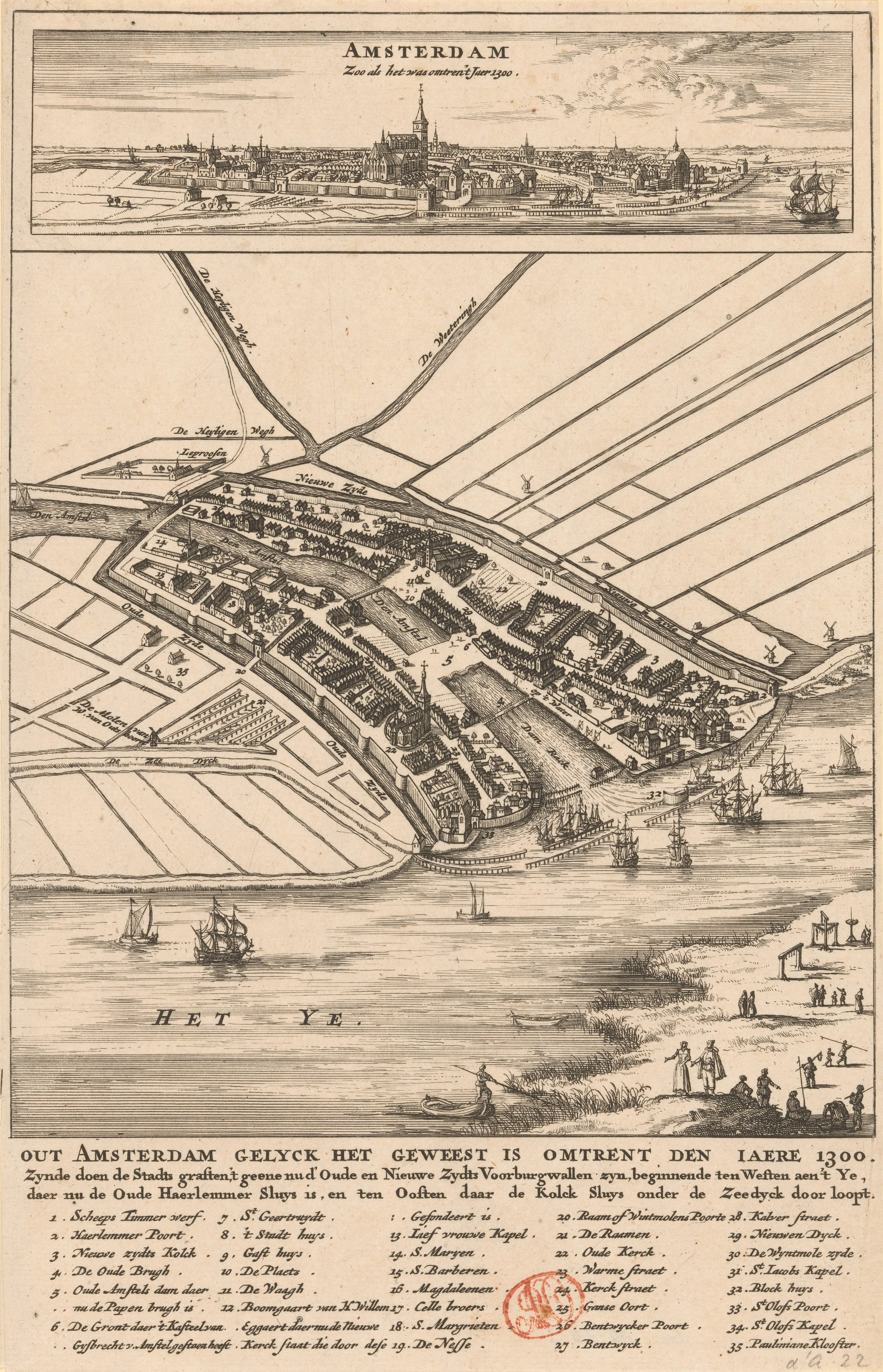
Amsterdam in 1300. 17th century impression by Jan Luyken

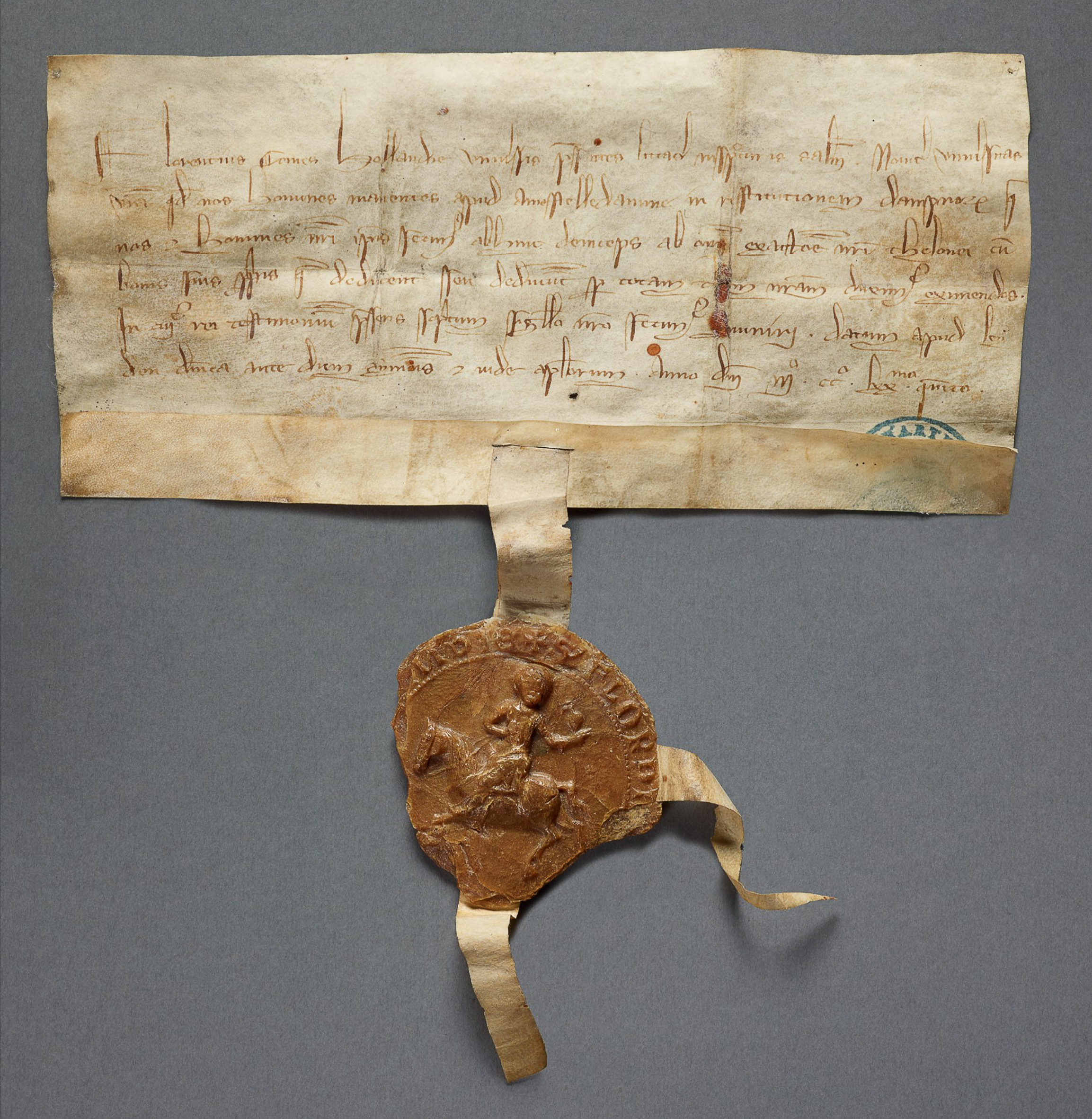
The Gift Letter of 1275, Toll-privilege

The yearbooks of Egmond Abbey chronicle 1204, when an army band of Kennemers arrived with a fleet to cross the dam of the Amstel. The fields were flooded with water. The Kennemers moved to Amstelland to pillage and destroy the pastures with fire. The fortified house of Gijsbrecht II van Amstel in Ouderkerk aan de Amstel was burned to the ground. The Van Amstel family, ruled the area by name of the Bishop of Utrecht. This event was later used by the Dutch poet Joost van den Vondel to write a historical play, the Gijsbrecht van Aemstel. A hundred years later (circa 1300), Jan I van Amstel (son of Gijsbrecht IV of Amstel and Johanna van der Lede), was brought into the newly with city rights recognized Amsterdam and admitted as their lord and was somewhat restored as lord of Amstelle. He was also ruler of Amsterdam during the siege of Amsterdam that followed shortly thereafter. After about a year he had to flee again. Chroniclers thought that he had left for Prussia (modern-day Northern Poland). However, he actually left for the Duchy of Brabant, where he already owned the lordships of Heeswijk and Dinther and the areas of Lopik and Schalkwijk in the Betuwe. In November 1203, the Count of Holland, Dirk VII died. William I became the Count of Holland and won the county after the Loon War (1203–1206) against Louis II.

An important year in the history of Amsterdam was 1275. While Aemstelland fell under the administrative jurisdiction of the Prince-Bishopric of Utrecht, Count Floris V of the County of Holland -the hindland of Aemstelland, granted traders, sailors and fishermen exemption from tolls. This "Gift Letter" document, dated 27 October 1275, is the oldest recorded usage of the name "Amestelledamme" - Amsterdam. This meant the inhabitants from the vicinity of Amestelledamme acquired a right to travel freely through the County of Holland without having to pay tolls at bridges, locks, and dams. This was the very start of the later richness of the young evolving city: by not having to pay tolls, traders could sell merchandise, shipped to Amestelledamme harbour from everywhere (Scandinavia, Denmark, Germany), at a more competitive price in Amsterdam and the hinterland. After the murder of Count Floris V in 1296, Amstelland again belonged to the Sticht. By 1327, the name had developed into Aemsterdam.

=== Late Middle Ages ===
Shortly after 1300, the first church was built which is now the Oude Kerk. Early Amsterdam around 1300 consisted of six hamlets (buurtschap): west of the Amstel the Windmolenzijde near the Nieuwezijds Kolk, Kalverstraat and the Dam and Bindwijk near the Spui, and east of the Amstel the Kerkzijde near the Oude Kerk, Gansoord near the Dam and Grimmenes near the Grimburgwal at the bend in the Amstel.

In 1306, Gwijde van Henegouwen, bishop of Utrecht, gave Amsterdam city rights. After his death (1317), Count Willem III inherited the Aemstelland, whereby Amsterdam fell under the County of Holland.

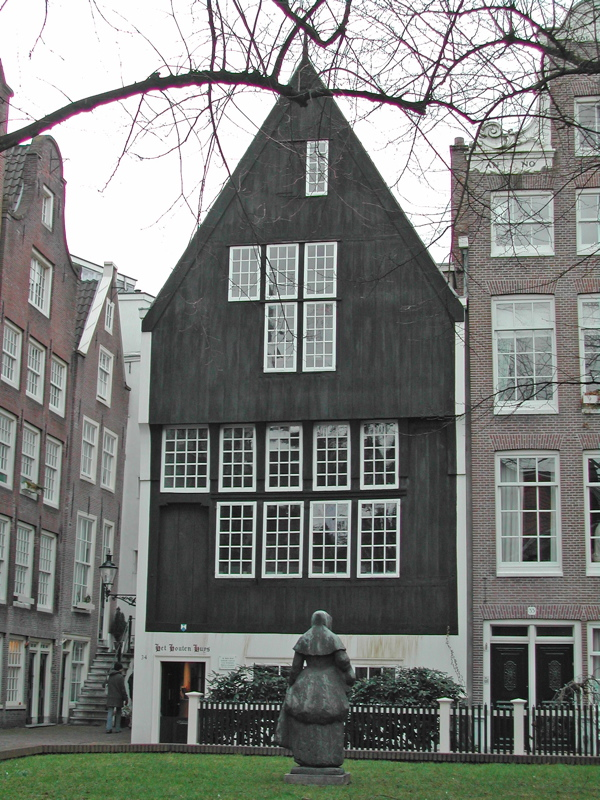
Het Houten Huys, Begijnhof - a rare wooden house from before the fire of 1452

In 1323, Willem III established a toll on the trade of beer from Hamburg. The main economic sectors at that time were brewing beer and fishing. The customs law for Hamburg beer granted in 1323 made a significant contribution to this. The contacts laid through the beer trade formed the basis for subsequent trade with cities of the Hanseatic league in the Baltic Sea, from where during the 14th and 15th centuries the Amsterdammers increasingly acquired grain and timber. In 1342, Count Willem IV awarded the city "Groot Privilege", which greatly strengthened the position of the city. During the 15th century, Amsterdam became the granary of the northern low countries and the most important trading city in Holland.

According to legend, on 12 March 1345, the miracle of Amsterdam occurred and Amsterdam became an important pilgrimage town. The town grew considerably thanks to the pilgrims. A Roman Catholic procession (Stille Omgang) occurs every year to celebrate the miracle.

Two great fires swept through the city in 1421 and 1452. After the second, when three quarters of the city were destroyed, Emperor Charles decreed that new houses were to be built from stone. Few wooden buildings remain from this period, a notable example being the Het Houten Huys ("The Wooden House") at the Begijnhof.

== Religious strife and revolt ==
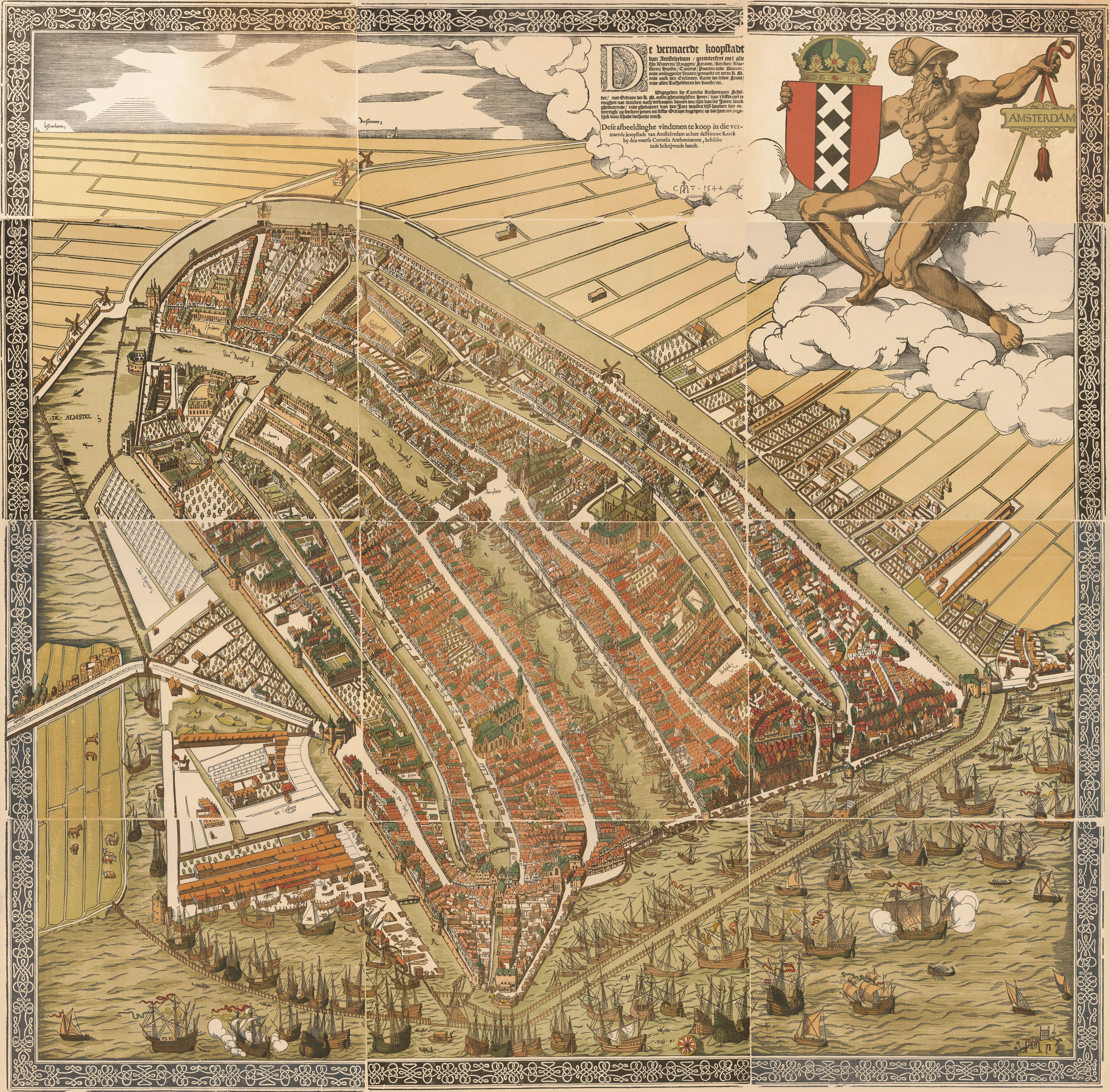
Amsterdam circa 1544, before the semi-circular ring of canals was added.

In the 16th century, Amsterdam was part of the Seventeen Provinces of the Habsburg Netherlands, which comprised approximately the Benelux countries. Since 1555, King Philip II of Spain was the Lord of the Seventeen Provinces.

In the first half of the 16th century, with the beginning of the Reformation, an important Mennonite (usually called Anabaptist) community formed in Amsterdam. Religious tension grew throughout the Empire until in 1534 the anabaptists of Munster rebelled and Emperor Charles V decreed a persecution of all members of this church. In two years, the authorities of Amsterdam executed 71 Mennonites and exiled many others. Executions would continue more sporadically until the 1550s.

The second half of the 16th century brought a rebellion of the Low Countries against the sovereign, the Hapsburg king Philip II of Spain. From 1566, the uprising was mainly caused by the lack of political power for the local nobility and by the religious conflict between Protestants and Catholics, the latter supported by The Crown. The Catholic king insisted on the relentless persecution of heretics, on the other hand, he sought to expand his powers at the expense of the urban bourgeoisie. Amsterdam began the war on The Crown's side. In 1572, almost all Dutch cities sided with the insurgents led by William I of Orange - only Amsterdam remained loyal to the Spanish king. This had catastrophic consequences: the Dutch rebels now blocked the port of Amsterdam, so that the city quickly became impoverished. In 1578, after six years, Amsterdam finally switched sides to the insurgents with a bloodless revolution called the Alteratie and gave its support to William. The rebellion led to the Eighty Years' War and eventually Dutch independence.

Amsterdam was then a Protestant city. The Catholics had no fear of persecution, but were no longer allowed to celebrate the mass in public. One of the results of the uprising was that Amsterdam enjoyed a certain degree of religious tolerance. Officially, only Calvinist worship was permitted, but in practice Catholic "clandestine churches" at private homes were tacitly tolerated, as were Lutheran and Mennonite ones. In the city, a large Roman Catholic minority remained, but the majority of the people belonged to the "Calvinist" Reformed Church and other Protestant denominations. Only members of the official Reformed Church could hold any public office.

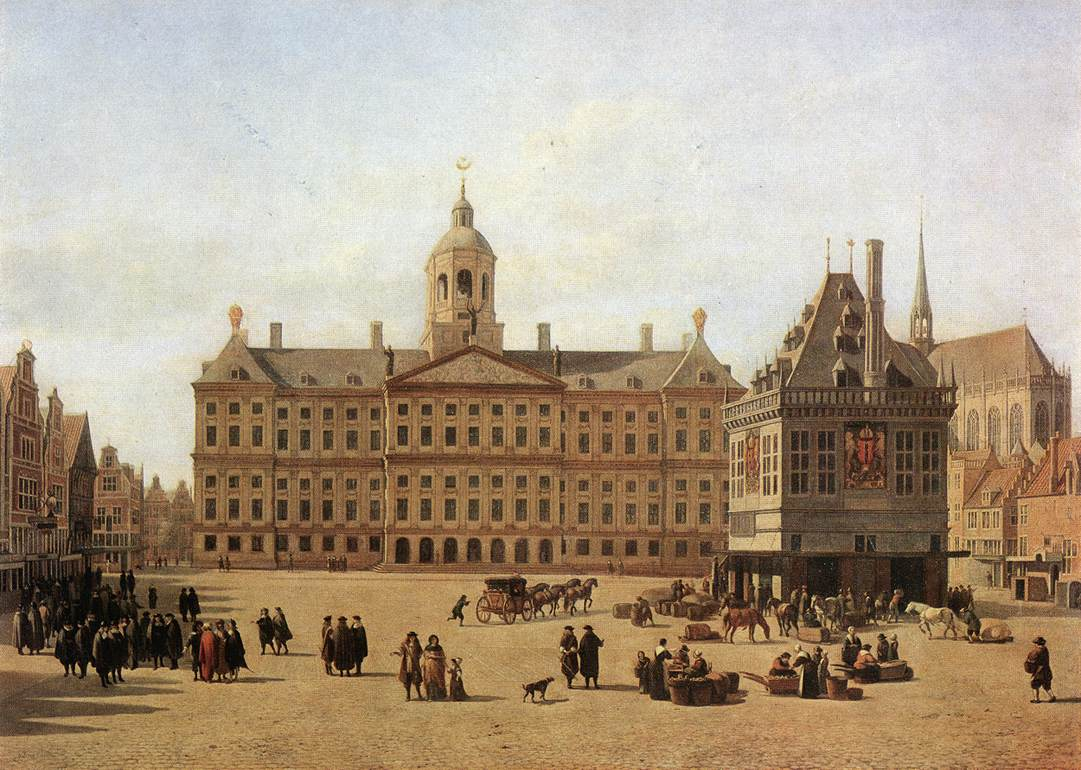
Dam Square in the late 17th century: painting by Gerrit Adriaenszoon Berckheyde (Gemäldegalerie, Dresden)

During these years religious wars raged throughout Europe and many people fled to the Dutch Republic and Amsterdam, where they sought refuge. Wealthy Jews from Spain and Portugal, Protestants from Antwerp and Huguenots from France sought safety in Amsterdam.

== The Golden Age (1585–1672) ==
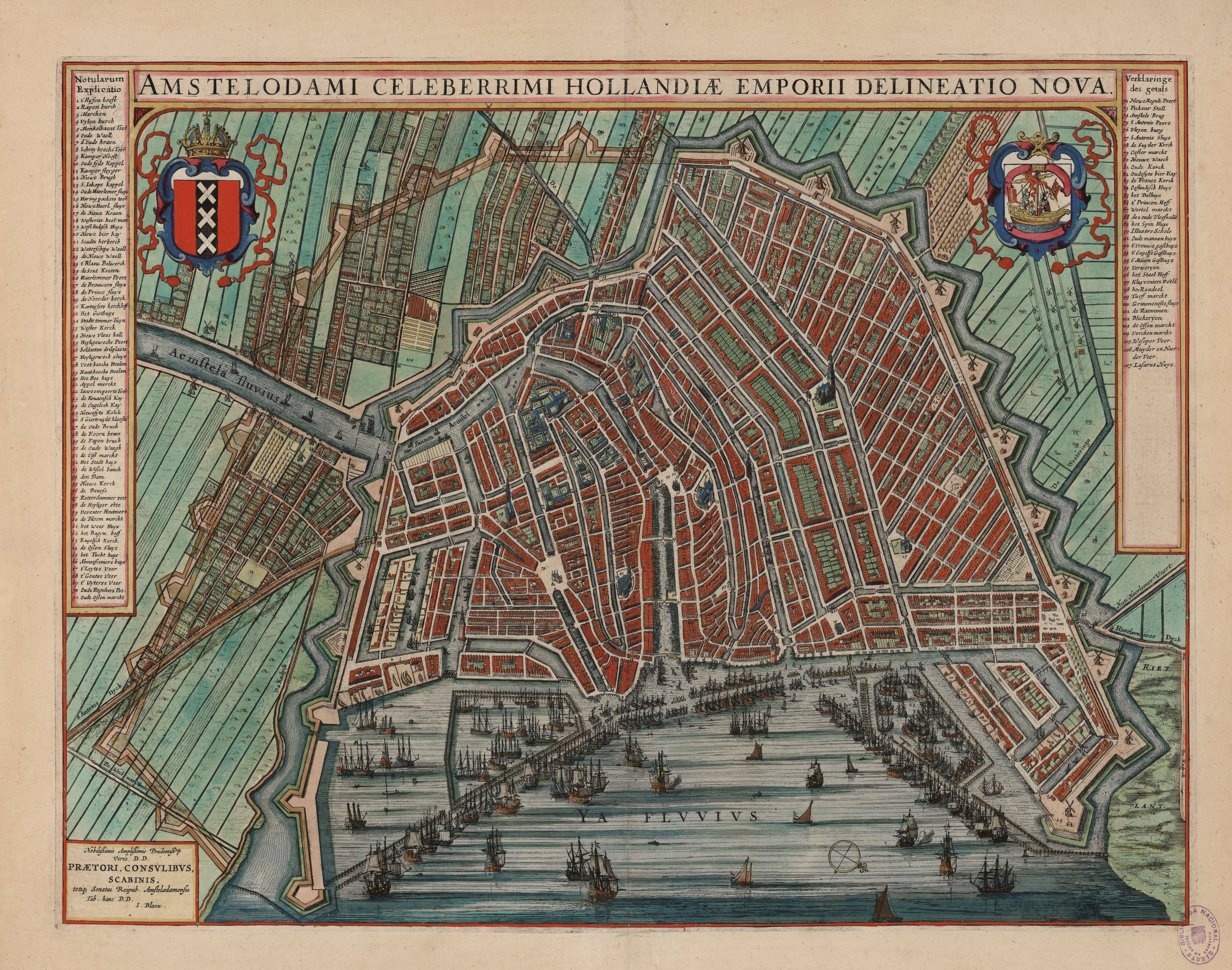
Amsterdam in 1649 with the first canal ring section

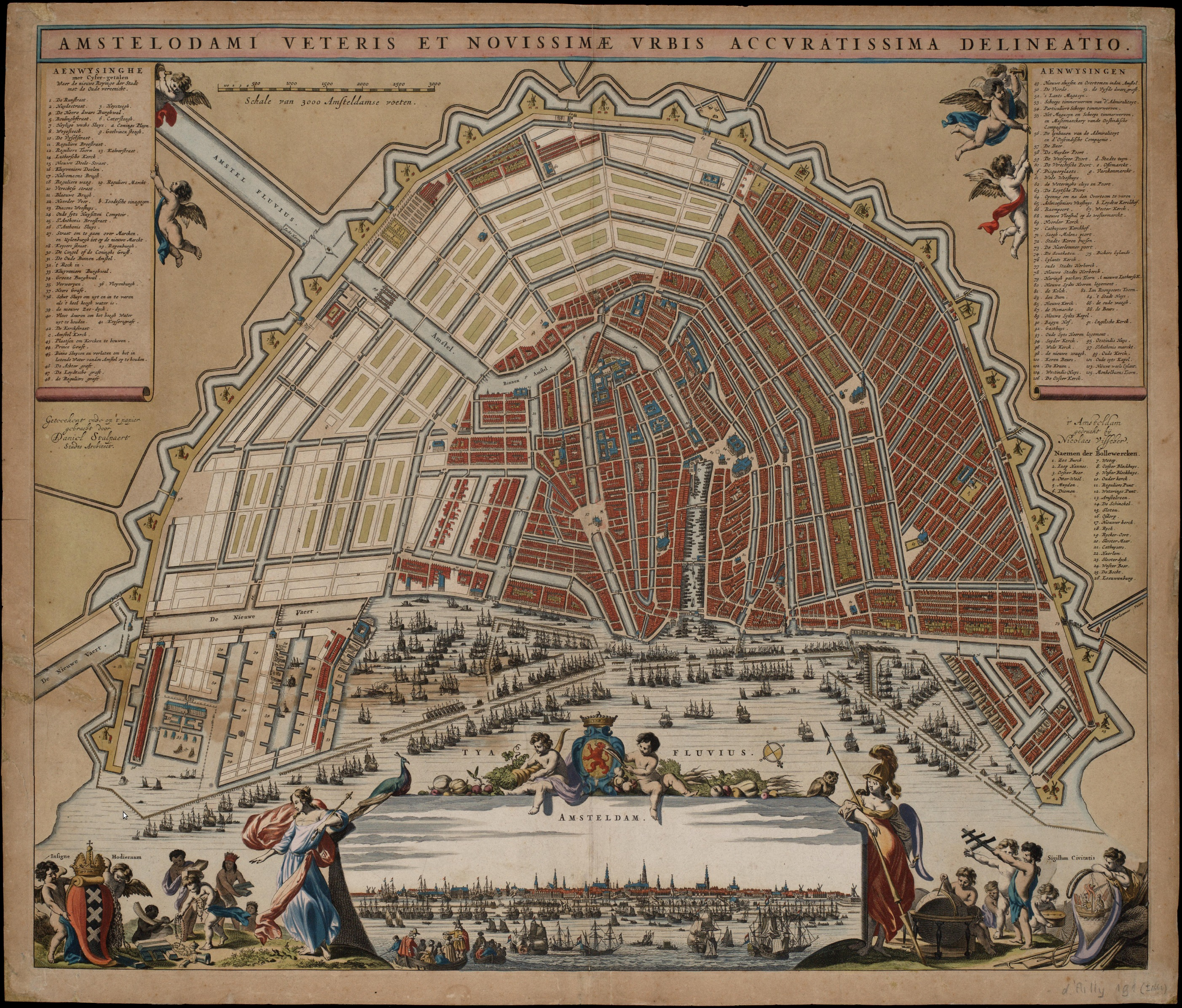
Amsterdam around 1662. The ring of canals is complete

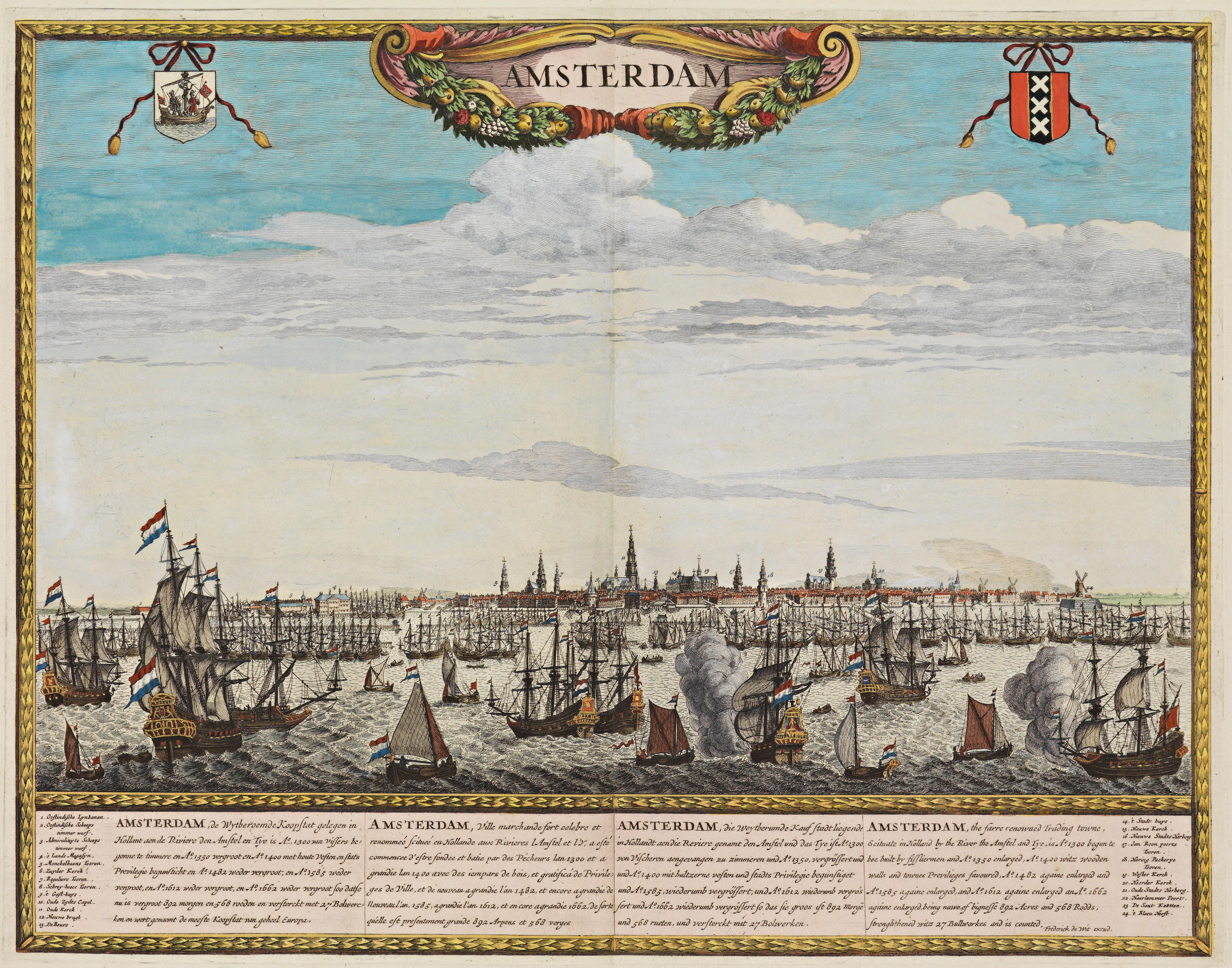
View of Amsterdam from the IJ, 1699

The 17th century was Amsterdam's Golden Age. Ships from the city sailed to North America, Indonesia, Brazil, and Africa and formed the basis of a worldwide trading network. Amsterdam's merchants financed expeditions to the four corners of the world and they acquired the overseas possessions which formed the seeds of the later Dutch colonies. The most influential of these merchant groups was the Dutch East India Company, founded 1602, which became the first multi-national corporation to issue stocks to finance its business. By allowing for sailors to invest in the cargo that they transported, it created an incentive for individual laborers to be vested in the goods they carried and tightened their allegiances to corporate outcomes, whereas before sailors were a migratory agents. Rembrandt painted in this century, and the city expanded greatly around its canals during this time. Amsterdam was the most important hub for the transshipment of goods in Europe and the leading financial centre of the western world. In 1611, the Amsterdam stock exchange was founded. It is considered the oldest "modern" securities market in the world. From 1613, Amsterdam expanded around the Canals and the port became the largest port in the world. The city had trade relations with 625 foreign ports. At that time, Amsterdam was the third largest city in Europe and the financial center of the world (including with the Bank of Amsterdam and the family's private bank Deutz of Deutz van Assendelft). The Tulip mania from 1630 to 1637 was the first large speculative bubble, a house in Amsterdam was sold for only three tulip bulbs.

=== Government by regents ===
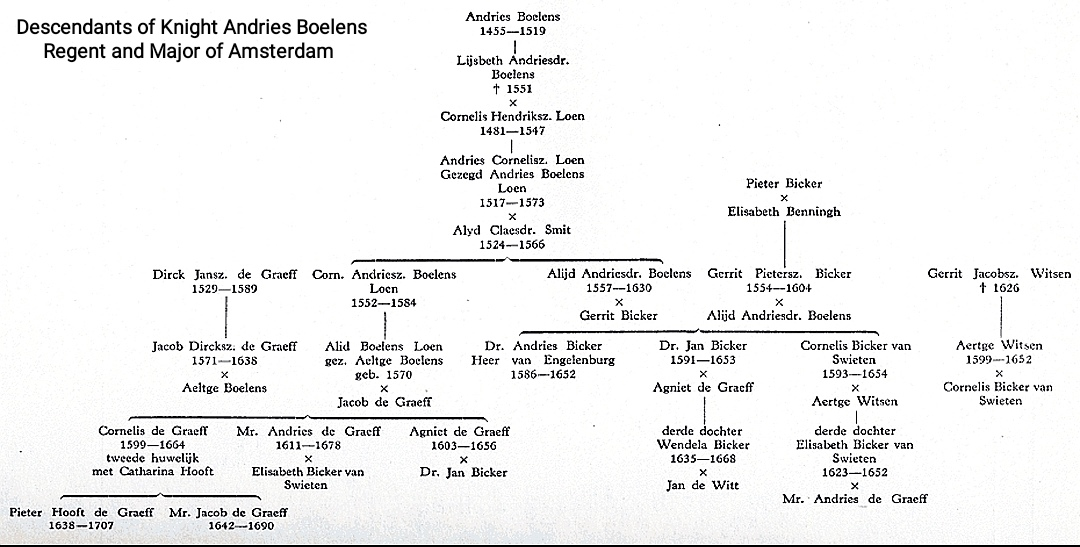
Overview of the personal family relationships of the Amsterdam oligarchy between the regent-dynasties Boelens Loen, De Graeff, Bicker (van Swieten), Witsen and Johan de Witt in the Dutch Golden Age

By the mid-1660s Amsterdam had reached the optimum population (about 200,000) for the level of trade, commerce and agriculture then available to support it. The city contributed the largest quota in taxes to the States of Holland which in turn contributed over half the quota to the States General. Amsterdam was also one of the most reliable in settling tax demands and therefore was able to use the threat to withhold such payments to good effect.

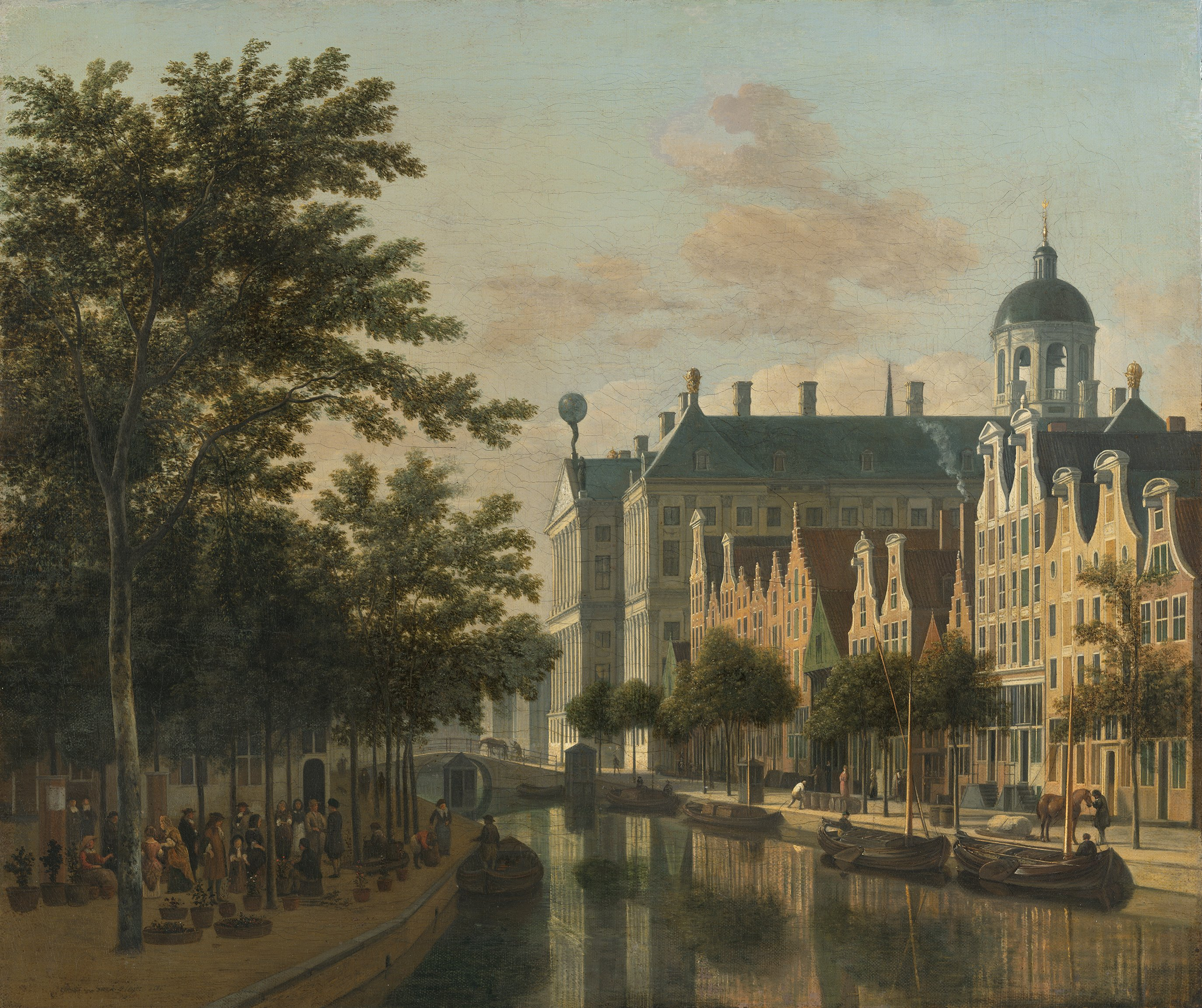
Nieuwezijds Voorburgwal canal, c. 1686

Amsterdam was governed by a body of Regenten (regents), a large, but closed, oligarchy with control over all aspects of the city's life, and a dominant voice in the foreign affairs of Holland. Only men with sufficient wealth and a long enough residence within the city could join the ruling class. The first step for an ambitious and wealthy merchant family was to arrange a marriage with a long-established regent family. In the 1670s, one such union, that of the Trip family (the Amsterdam branch of the Swedish arms makers) with the son of Burgomaster Valckenier, extended the influence and patronage available to the latter and strengthened his dominance of the council. The oligarchy in Amsterdam thus gained strength from its breadth and openness. In the smaller towns, family interest could unite members on policy decisions but contraction through intermarriage could lead to the degeneration of the quality of the members. In Amsterdam, the network was so large that members of the same family could be related to opposing factions and pursue widely separated interests. The young men who had risen to positions of authority in the 1670s and 1680s consolidated their hold on office well into the 1690s and even the new century.

Significant Amsterdam regent-patrician dynasties of the Golden Century included the Boelens Loen, De Graeff, Bicker, Pauw and Hooft. At the height of the Golden Age, the First governorless period from 1650 to Rampjaar in 1672, political power within Holland was mainly two state-minded: republican, and families. In Amsterdam this was with the brothers Cornelis and Andries de Graeff. In The Hague, it was with the brothers Johan and Cornelis de Witt, the leader of the state-minded (republican) faction of Holland, which was reinforced by their close cooperation and mutual kinship.

Amsterdam's regents provided good services to residents. They spent heavily on the water-ways and other essential infrastructure, as well as municipal almshouses for the elderly, hospitals and churches. The regents favoring of private investment also helped to raise standards of living, as construction of commercially viable and advanced windmills brought more efficient factories for refining goods and irrigation pumps to the region, allowing for one of the earliest industrial driven economies.

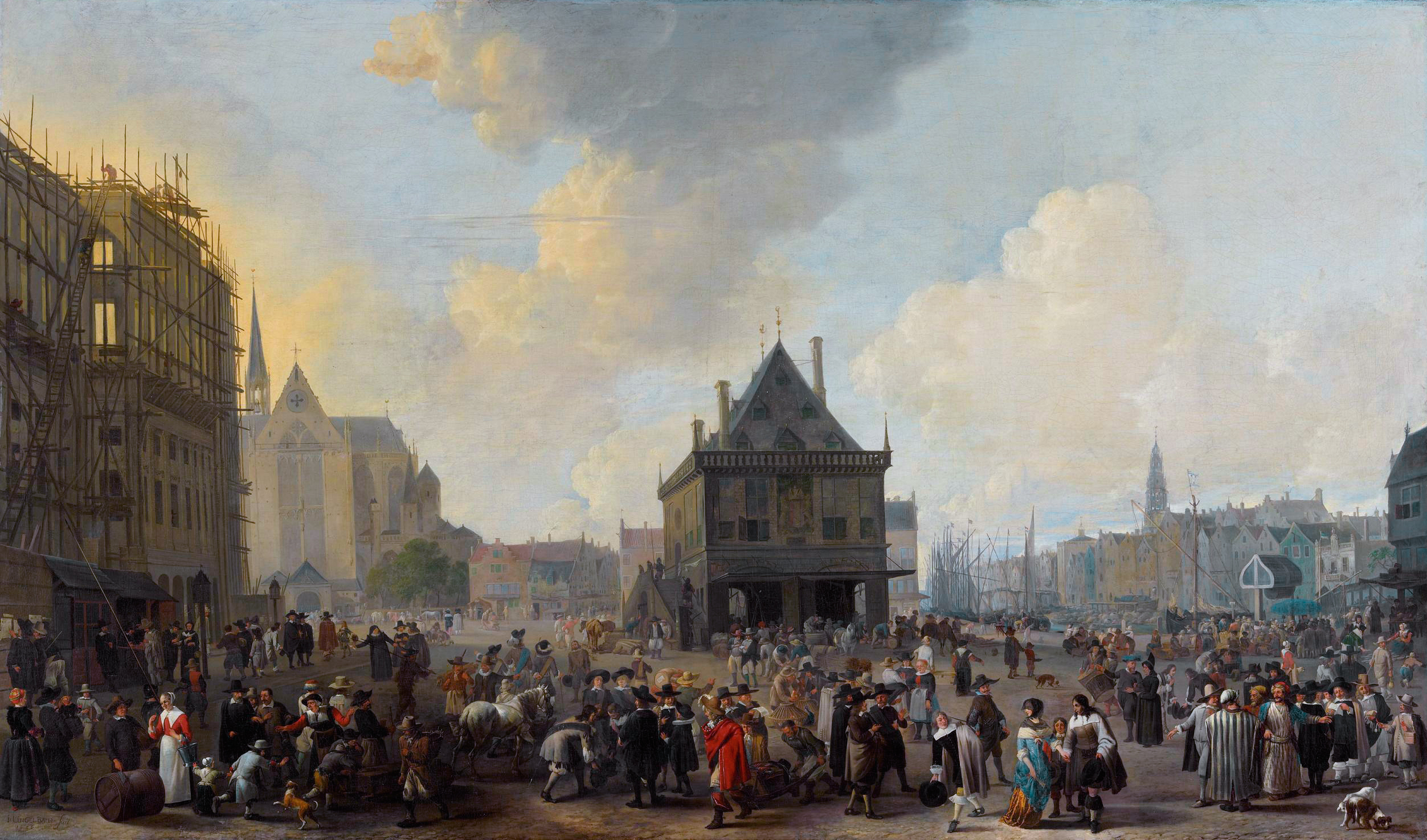
Amsterdam's Dam Square, 17th century

Amsterdam's wealth was generated by its commerce, which was in turn sustained by the judicious encouragement of entrepreneurs whatever their origin. This arrangement was supported by low interest-rates to private businesses, whereas communities governed by monarchies at the time sought to siphon profits. This open-door policy has been interpreted as proof of a tolerant ruling class. But toleration was practiced for the convenience of the city. Therefore, the wealthy Sephardic Jews from Portugal were welcomed and accorded all privileges except those of citizenship, but the poor Ashkenazi Jews from Eastern Europe were far more carefully vetted and those who became dependent on the city were encouraged to move on. Similarly, provision for the housing of Huguenot immigrants was made in 1681 when Louis XIV's religious policy was beginning to drive these Protestants out of France; no encouragement was given to the dispossessed Dutch from the countryside or other towns of Holland. The regents encouraged immigrants to build churches and provided sites or buildings for churches and temples for all but the most radical sects and the native Catholics by the 1670s (although even the Catholics could practice quietly in a chapel within the Begijnhof).

=== Immigration ===
Until 1584, Antwerp was the largest Dutch city and the cultural, economic, and financial centre of the Seventeen Provinces and of Northwestern Europe. However, the Fall of Antwerp in 1585 offered Amsterdam unprecedented opportunities since Amsterdam took over that position. There was a large influx of Antwerp merchants who chose to live in Amsterdam; the blockade of the Scheldt by the Geuzen caused Antwerp's influence to decline even further. The extent of which the migration of Antwerp (and other Southern Dutch) merchants contributed to the rise of Amsterdam remains a disputed matter. Some believe that their role was not decisive. Others argue that this migration movement brought the necessary expertise (particularly in financial markets and insurance) and international trade contacts that would give Amsterdam its prosperity.

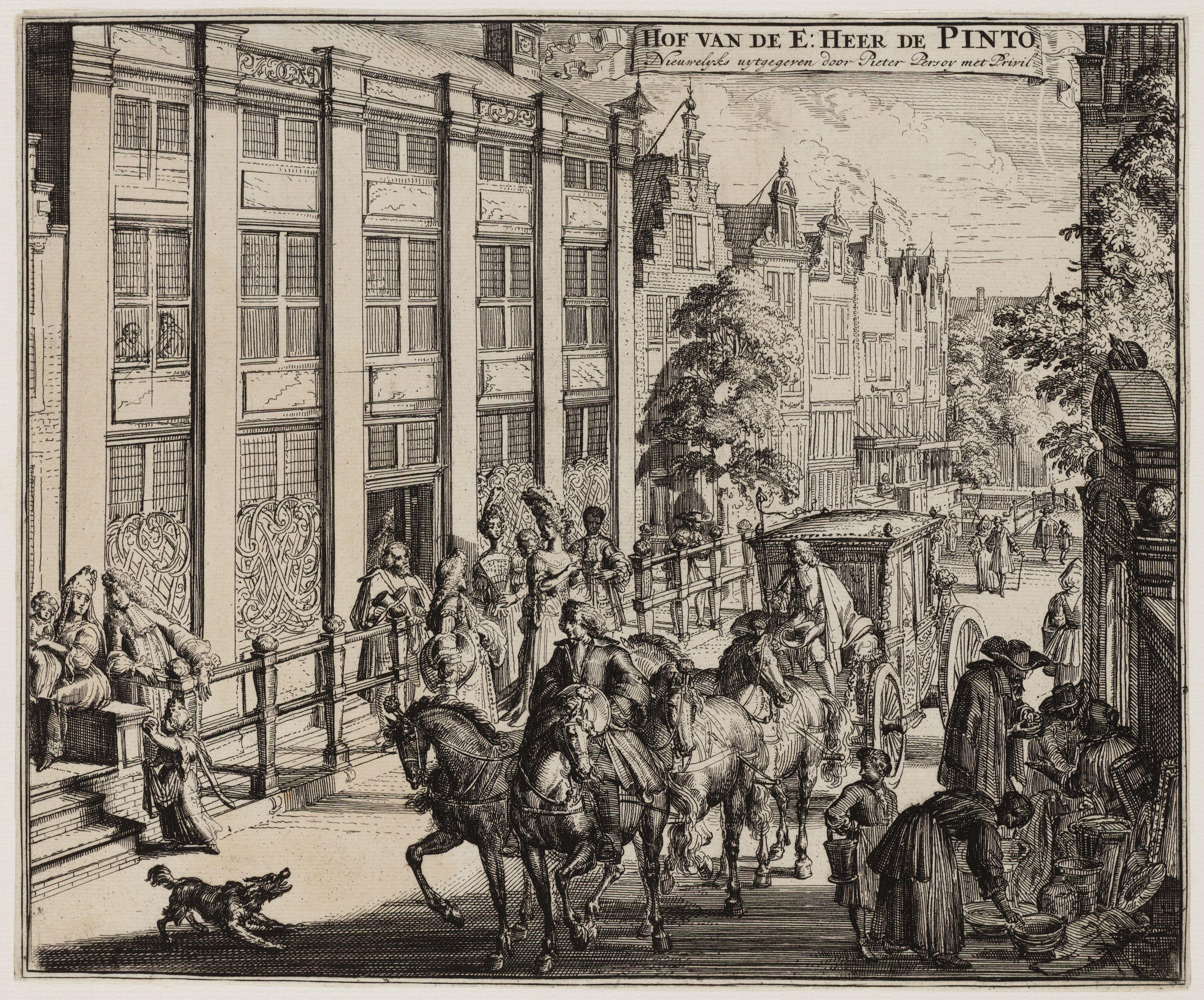
DePinto House owned by the prosperous De Pinto merchant family of Portuguese Jewish origin. Amsterdam did not have restricted residential quarters, so immigrants could live anywhere. Engraving by Romeyn de Hooghe c. 1695

During the 17th and 18th century, Amsterdam was a city where immigrants formed the majority. According to calculations by Erika Kuijpers, almost a third of the population were immigrants in the first half of the 17th century. Most immigrants were Germans who were usually Lutheran Protestant. Smaller groups were French Huguenots, and Ashkenazi/Sephardic Jews.

The integration of immigrants was smooth. It was not hard to find work as a craftsman, but craftsmen were forced to join guilds, to serve in the city patrol and to cooperate in the local district to compete with other districts. These were powerful institutions that resulted in quick integration, especially since all these institutions were mainly filled with immigrants or children of immigrants. The city council of Amsterdam consisted of people with all kinds of backgrounds: Dutch, German, Flemish, French, Scottish. Immigration completely changed Amsterdam's social fabric: a city of artisans and small merchants, without too stark differences between rich and poor, became a metropolis with internationally oriented trade princes and a large proletariat.

Due to freedom of religion in the Netherlands, Amsterdam became a haven for the persecuted. In 1675 the Portuguese Synagogue, the largest in the world at the time, opened there. The Yiddish language of Eastern European Jews, had a major impact on the Amsterdam dialect of Dutch.

The Armenians are another notable group who migrated to Amsterdam from the 16th to the 19th century. The Armenians had a trading network that stretched from the far east (Manila, India, Nepal, Iran) to Europe and, most notably, Amsterdam. The Armenians mainly traded Iranian silk, which they had a monopoly over. Iranian silk was very popular in Amsterdam; hence, it made the Armenian community very wealthy, and the Armenians flourished in Amsterdam. Amsterdam was known for religious and ethnic tolerance, where they welcomed people from all over the world. Hence, it made Amsterdam a hotspot for Armenians. Although Armenian traces in the Netherlands go back to the 4th century, Armenian merchants started appearing on mass in the 12th century, and the highest numbers were in the 17th century. The Armenian traders imported and exported almost everything, selling spices, gold, pearls, diamonds, and silk to the Dutch and buying yellow amber from them, which they sold in Smyrna. Due to religious and ethnic tolerance, the Armenians built their own churches, cultural centers, schools, universities, and printing presses in Amsterdam and the rest of the Netherlands. These churches and cultural centers exist to this day. In response to Dutch generosity, the Armenians integrated into their society very smoothly, and they became part of its society. A Dutch writer said in the magazine De Amsterdammer (14 August 1887): "The story of the Armenian community is a golden page in the history of the city of Amsterdam."

=== Plague ===
However, the city's trading status meant it suffered from an outbreak of bubonic plague from 1663 to 1666, supposed to have come from Algiers to Amsterdam. (The plague also broke out in the trading center of London in June 1665.) Though it had little initial effect, the impact grew in autumn 1663 and in 1664. The wife and youngest daughter of well known collector of paintings Jan J. Hinlopen, as well as Rembrandt's partner Hendrickje Stoffels, fell victim to it that autumn. According to Samuel Pepys, for a few weeks at the end of 1663, ships from Hamburg and Amsterdam were quarantined for thirty days. In 1664, 24,148 people were buried in Amsterdam. More than 10% of the population died in this period - everybody that came into contact with the plague was at risk. At the time people assumed the plague was caused by the digging of new canals.

Surprisingly, tobacco smoke was regarded as an effective prophylactic against the plague. With the prospect of the plague, as well as war with England looming, the English ambassador commented in May 1664: "there are dead this last week to the number 338 at Amsterdam and if the plague thus increases within, and a warre with His Majestie without, there will be little need of that vast new towne which they are making there". Rich people left the cities to avoid the disease, but in the worst week of the pandemic of 1664, in Amsterdam there were 1,041 burials compared with 7,000 in the late summer of 1665 in London, a city twice its size. The mayors warned the population that eating salad, spinach or prunes could be unhealthy. The vroedschap shut the theatre, allowing performances to resume only in 1666, though Jan J. Hinlopen's own death in 1666 is ascribed to the plague. Sailors on ships out to sea were relatively safe.

== Decline and modernization ==
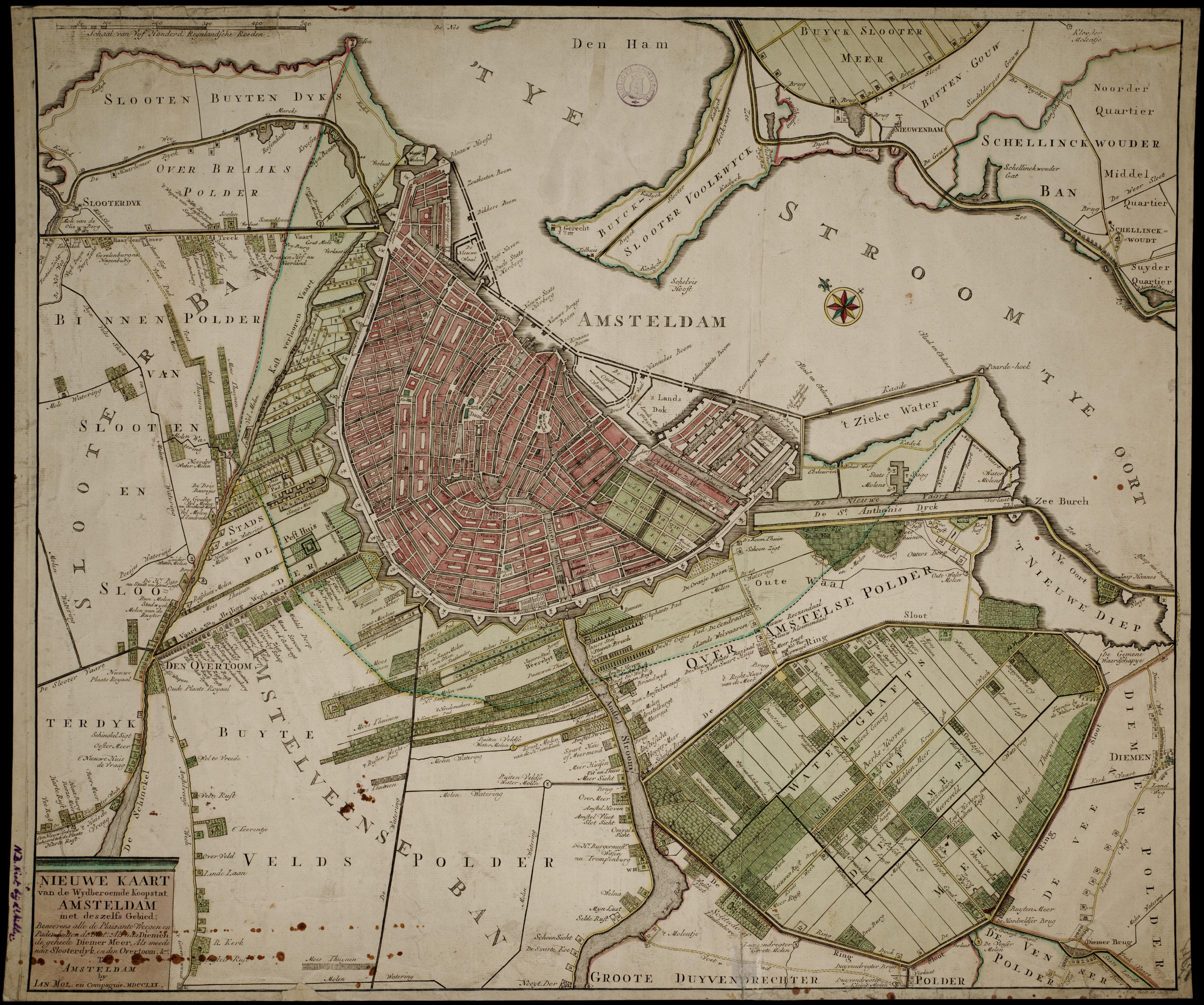
Amsterdam and surroundings around 1770. The expansion came to a standstill

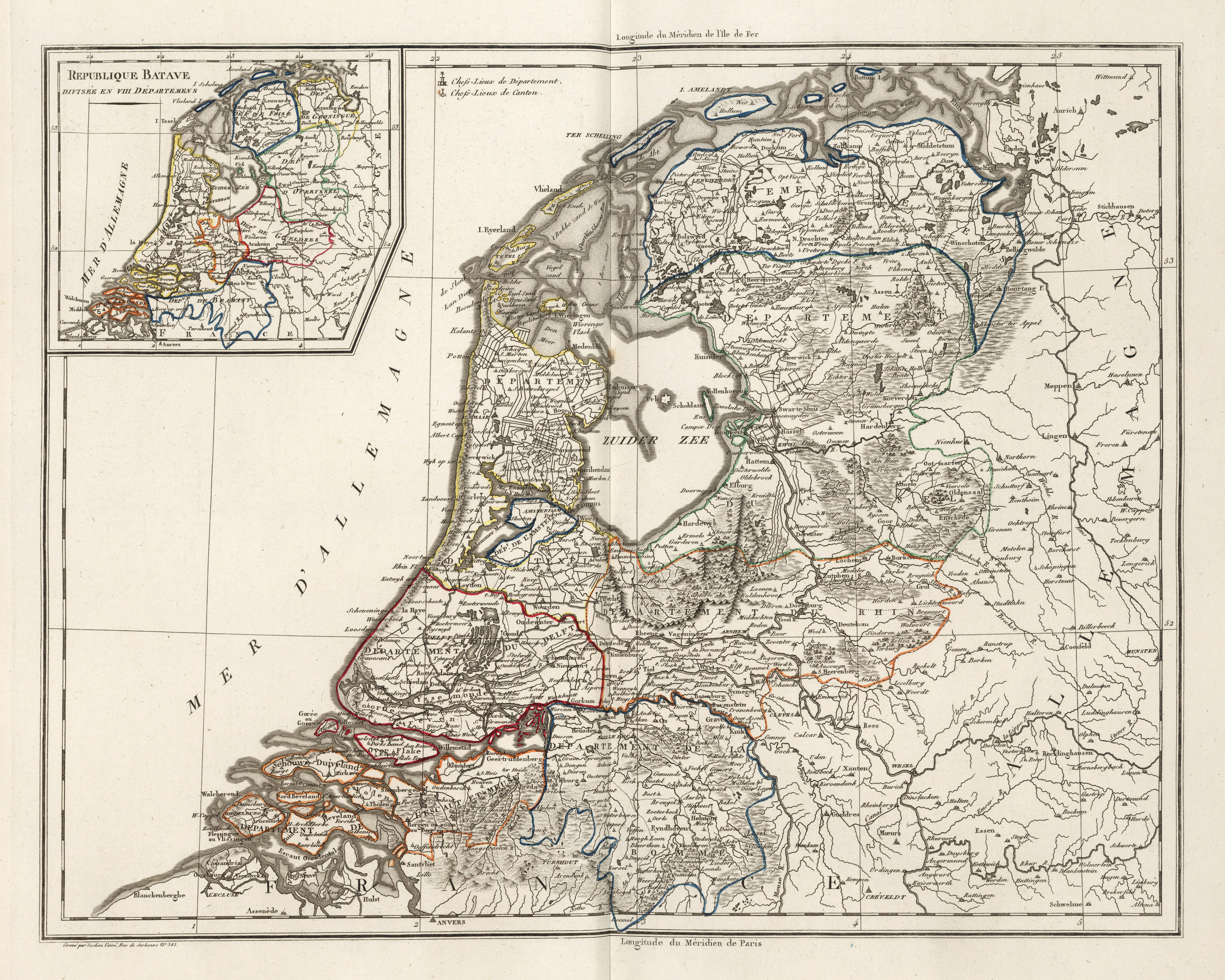
The Batavian Republic and the Department of the Amstel, 1799-1802

The 18th and early 19th centuries saw a decline in Amsterdam's prosperity and the Dutch Republic. The main reasons were increased competition from England, France, Prussia and Russia. The Franco-Dutch War and the Anglo-Dutch Wars, in particular the Fourth Anglo-Dutch War (1780–1784) had a devastating effect.

In 1795, the Netherlands was conquered by France. During the occupation and the upheaval the old Republic of the Seven United Netherlands was transformed into a modern unitary state, the Batavian Republic (1795–1806). This was a satellite state of Napoleonic France. Subsequently, was the transition to the Kingdom of Holland in 1806. Emperor Napoleon installed his brother Louis Bonaparte as the King of Holland (1806–1810). The Batavian Republic was divided into 8 departments named after rivers. From 1799 to 1802, Amsterdam was the capital of the Department of the Amstel. The Netherlands was annexed by the First French Empire in 1810. The incorporation act called the Decree of Rambouillet (8/9 July 1810) kept the structure of the Kingdom of Holland largely intact. In 1810, Amsterdam was officially declared the third imperial capital in the First French Empire, after Paris and Rome. The Royal Palace of Amsterdam became an imperial palace. Napoleon and his wife Marie Louise spent 1 night in the palace.

During the Napoleonic Wars, Amsterdam's fortunes reached their lowest point. The Continental System was an economic blockade which led to their severe impoverishment. In the course of Wars of Liberation the French troops left Amsterdam in mid-November 1813. On 16 November, the citizens of Amsterdam successfully rose against the remaining French and drove out the occupiers.

Circumstances slowly began to improve with the establishment of the United Kingdom of the Netherlands which unified the low countries (1815–1830). Amsterdam was the capital and the largest city, but The Hague and Brussels were the government centers. In Amsterdam, new developments started by people like Samuel Sarphati who found their inspiration in Paris.

In the second half of the 19th century, Amsterdam gradually changed to an industrial city. Important new economic sectors were the diamond industry, shipbuilding, clothing and engine factories and later car and aircraft production.

In 1863 there was sufficient support and parliament approval for the North Sea Canal. The purpose was to improve access to bigger seafaring steamships and for the competitive position of Amsterdam. The land-reclamation and excavation work was privately funded. This canal connects Amsterdam via IJmuiden to the North Sea. Both projects dramatically improved the communication with the rest of Europe and the world. They gave the economy a big boost.

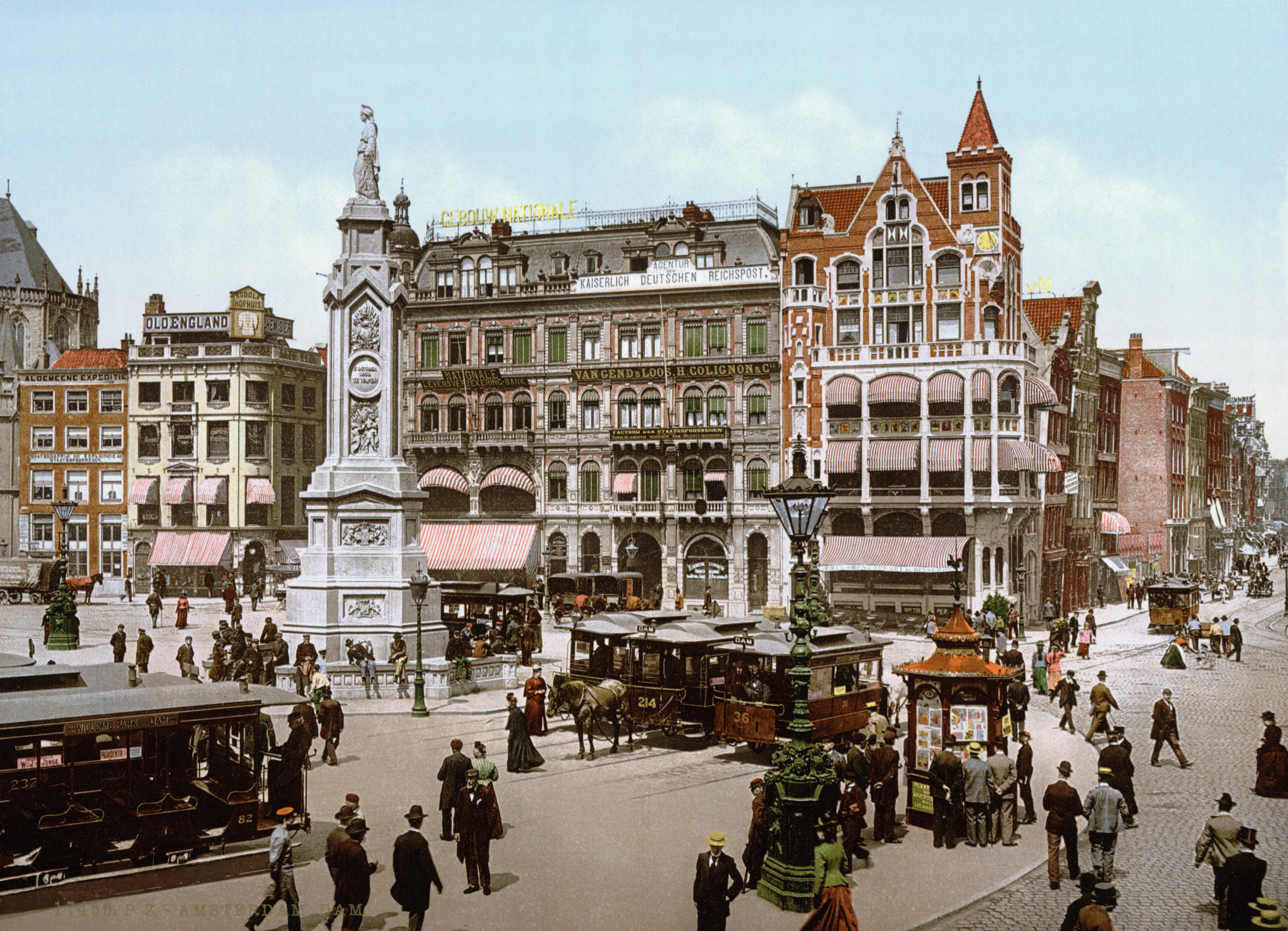
Dam Square, Amsterdam as it appeared c. 1890–1900 with the "Naatje of the Dam" statue.

The industrial revolution led to a huge influx of worker migrants from the Dutch countryside into the city of Amsterdam. This occurred during the rise of socialism in Amsterdam. The Dutch authorities tried to destroy socialism by treating socialists with violence. During the 1880s and 1890s, fights between the police and the socialists occurred on a weekly basis. A notorious event was the Palingoproer (eel riots) in 1886, when 26 demonstrators were killed by the army after the police were unable to control a riotous crowd of men watching an outlawed game of eel-pulling. Another was the Orange riots of 1887, which included the destruction of a socialist pub by orangists and the arrest of the defending socialists, while the orangists were not punished at all. The most popular socialist leaders of the 1890s were those who had been in jail most of the time. One socialist was so angry with the police, that he tried to kill the chief superintendent of the police. He shot a hole in the hat of the superintendent and was sentenced to many years in jail after being beaten up by policemen. After his release, he was welcomed as a hero during a parade with a laurel wreath on his head, while people were crying in the crowded streets filled with workers from Amsterdam.

The end of the 19th century is sometimes called Amsterdam's second Golden Age. New museums, the Centraal Station (1889), and the Concertgebouw (1886) were built. The Stelling van Amsterdam were constructed to defend the city. This is a unique ring of 45 forts with dams, dikes, locks, pumping stations, batteries and casemates. Land could be inundated to defend the city against an attack. Amsterdam's population grew significantly during this period.

== 20th century ==
During World War I, the Netherlands remained neutral, but Amsterdam suffered the effects of the war when food became scarce. When working-class women started to plunder a ship with army supplies, the military was brought in. Workers joined their wives in the plundering and the soldiers opened fire on them. Six people were killed and almost 100 were wounded.

=== Expansion ===
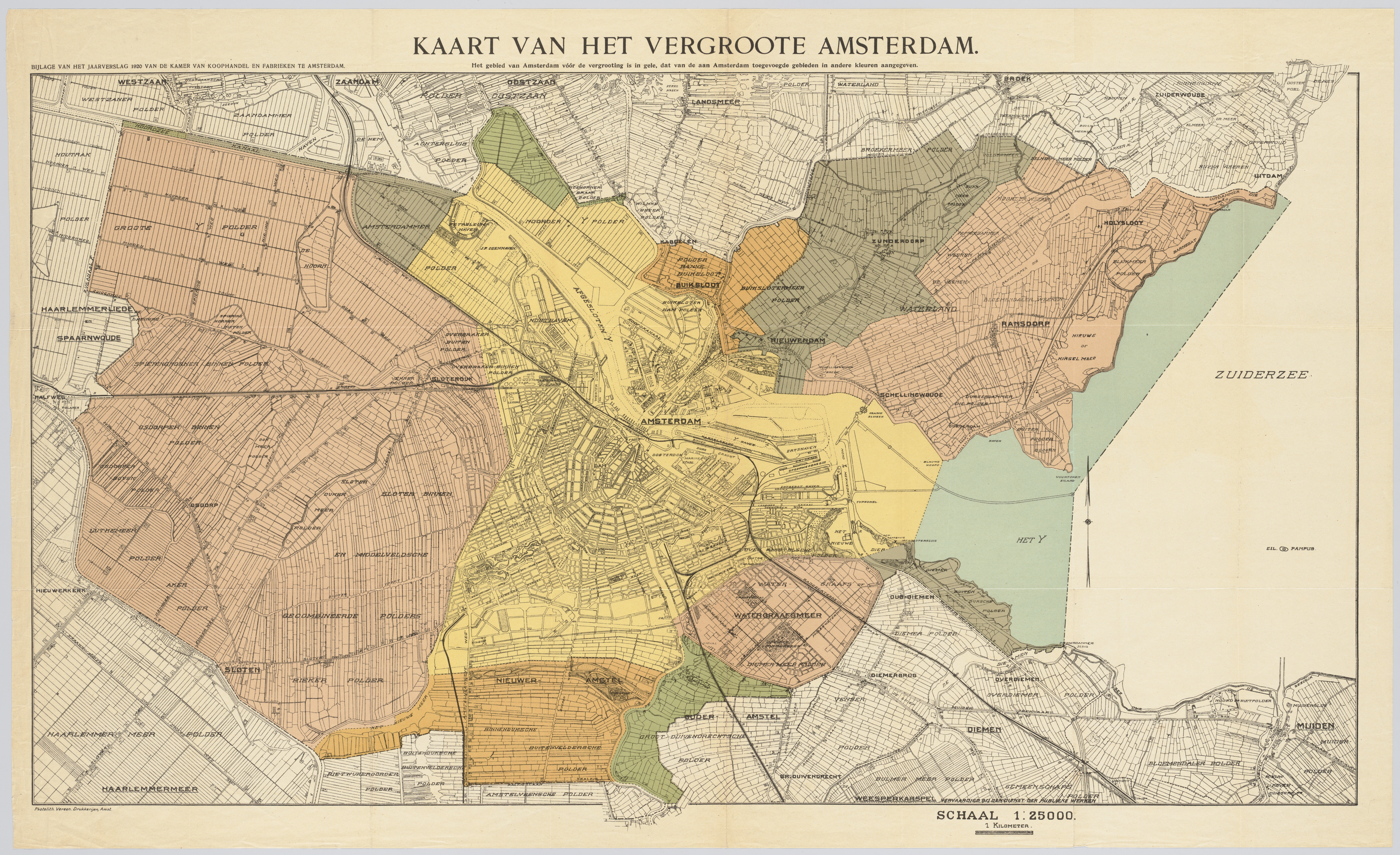
Map of the Enlarged Amsterdam in 1921. Yellow is the territory of Amsterdam before the annexations. All other colored areas are the incorporated municipalities in 1921

During the interwar period, Amsterdam continued to expand with rapid economic and population growth. There was a lack of space for companies and shipyards. The city required additional surrounding lands and near the riverbanks of the IJ. In 1920, between Christmas and New Year's Eve, the Senate (Eerste Kamer) passed the Amsterdam Expansion Act. On 1 January 1921, the city became 4x larger from 4,630-hectare (11,400-acre) to 17,455-hectare (43,130-acre) with 36,000 additional inhabitants and a strip of the Zuiderzee. The municipalities Buiksloot, Nieuwendam, Ransdorp, Watergraafsmeer and Sloten were fully annexed.

The 1928 Summer Olympics were hosted in Amsterdam. The Olympic Stadium was built and used as the main sporting venue from 28 July to 12 August 1928.

In 1932, the Afsluitdijk was completed which separated the Zuiderzee from the North Sea. The Zuiderzee behind the dike became a new lake called the IJsselmeer. For the first time in its history, Amsterdam had no open communication with the sea. However, the North Sea Canal connects the Port of Amsterdam with the North Sea. The Amsterdam-Rijn kanaal was dug and completed in 1952 to give Amsterdam a direct connection to the Rhine.

=== World War II ===
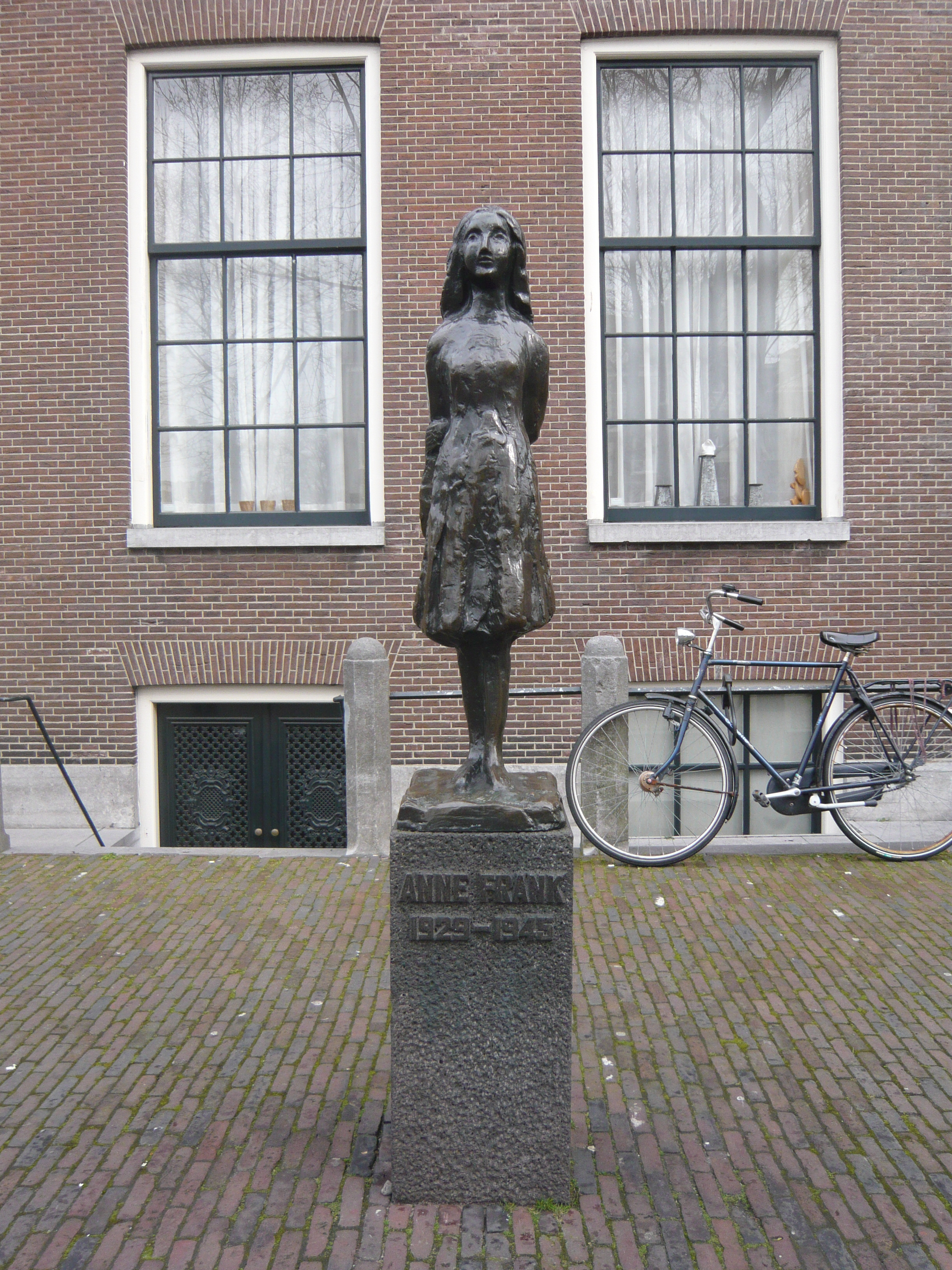
Statue of Anne Frank

During World War II, the Nazis invaded the Netherlands and occupied Amsterdam until their defeat in 1945. The February strike in 1941 was a unique mass protest against the persecution of Jews in Amsterdam which was unprecedented in occupied Europe.

Many Amsterdam Jews were hiding which saved their lives. Others collaborated with the German occupiers. The local police led by chief Sybren Tulp were particularly guilty. Jews in the Netherlands never lived in an enclosed ghetto, but there was an informal Jewish Quarter. During the Nazi occupation, Jews were forced from their homes elsewhere and required to live in the Jewish Quarter. From there, more than 100,000 Dutch Jews were deported, including German-Jewish refugees Anne Frank and her sister Margot Frank, who were hidden away from the Jewish Quarter. Three-quarters of the Netherlands Jewish population perished in the Holocaust, the highest percentage in Western Europe under Nazi occupation. Before the war, Amsterdam was the world's center for the diamond trade which was mostly in the hands of Jewish businessmen and craftsmen. The diamond trade essentially disappeared. In the postwar period, few Jews returned to Amsterdam. The Jewish Quarter's building were largely derelict and vacant. During the Hunger Winter of 1944, it is estimated that 20,000 people died in Amsterdam and in the other cities not yet liberated in the west of the Netherlands as a result of the exhaustion. The Nazis cut off food supplies and other necessities, the buildings were stripped of wood and furniture for fuel. The remnants were left to rot. Now the area is characterized by the absence of buildings erected before 1980, when the area was rebuilt. The Stopera complex, with the opera and city hall, were built in the 1980s in the area of the old Jewish Quarter. The three allied bombings of the Fokker plants caused more than 200 civilian deaths in Amsterdam-Noord.

The German forces in the Netherlands surrendered to the Allies on 5 May 1945. However, the western part of the country remained occupied by the Germans until Allied troops could arrive to disarm them. Two days later thousands of people gathered on the Dam, to celebrate and welcome the approaching Anglo-Canadian forces. However German troops opened fire on the crowd killing some thirty people. A few hours later the first allied troops arrived - the British 49th Reconnaissance Regiment under commander Richard Taite reached the Royal Palace of Amsterdam. Taite received the surrender of the German Ortskommandant Oberstleutnant Hans A. Schröder, in preparation for its occupation by the First Canadian Army who arrived the following day. On 9 May Tens of thousands gathered on Dam square to celebrate the liberation and listen to speeches by Prime Minister Pieter Sjoerds Gerbrandy.

=== Post War ===
During the 1970s, the number of foreign immigrants, primarily from Morocco, Suriname, Turkey and the Netherlands Antilles grew strongly. This increase led to an exodus of people to the 'growth cities' of Purmerend, Almere and other cities near Amsterdam. However, neighbourhoods like the Pijp and the Jordaan, which had previously been working class, became sought out places of residence for the newly wealthy yuppies and students. The poor neighborhoods became more prosperous thanks to the economic trend towards a service economy instead of an industrial economy.

In 1992, an El Al cargo plane crashed in the Bijlmermeer in Amsterdam Zuidoost. This disaster, called the Bijlmerramp, caused the death of at least 43 people.

At the beginning of the millennium, social problems such as safety, ethnic discrimination, and segregation between religious and social groups began to develop. 45% of the population of Amsterdam had non-Dutch parents. Amsterdam is characterized by its (perceived) social tolerance and diversity. The social tolerance was endangered by the murder of Dutch film-maker Theo van Gogh on 2 November 2004 by a Mohamed Bouyeri, an Islamic fundamentalist. The mayor of Amsterdam, Job Cohen, and his alderman for integration Ahmed Aboutaleb formulated a policy of "keeping things together" which involves social dialogue, tolerance and harsh measures against those who break the law.

==== Social struggles ====
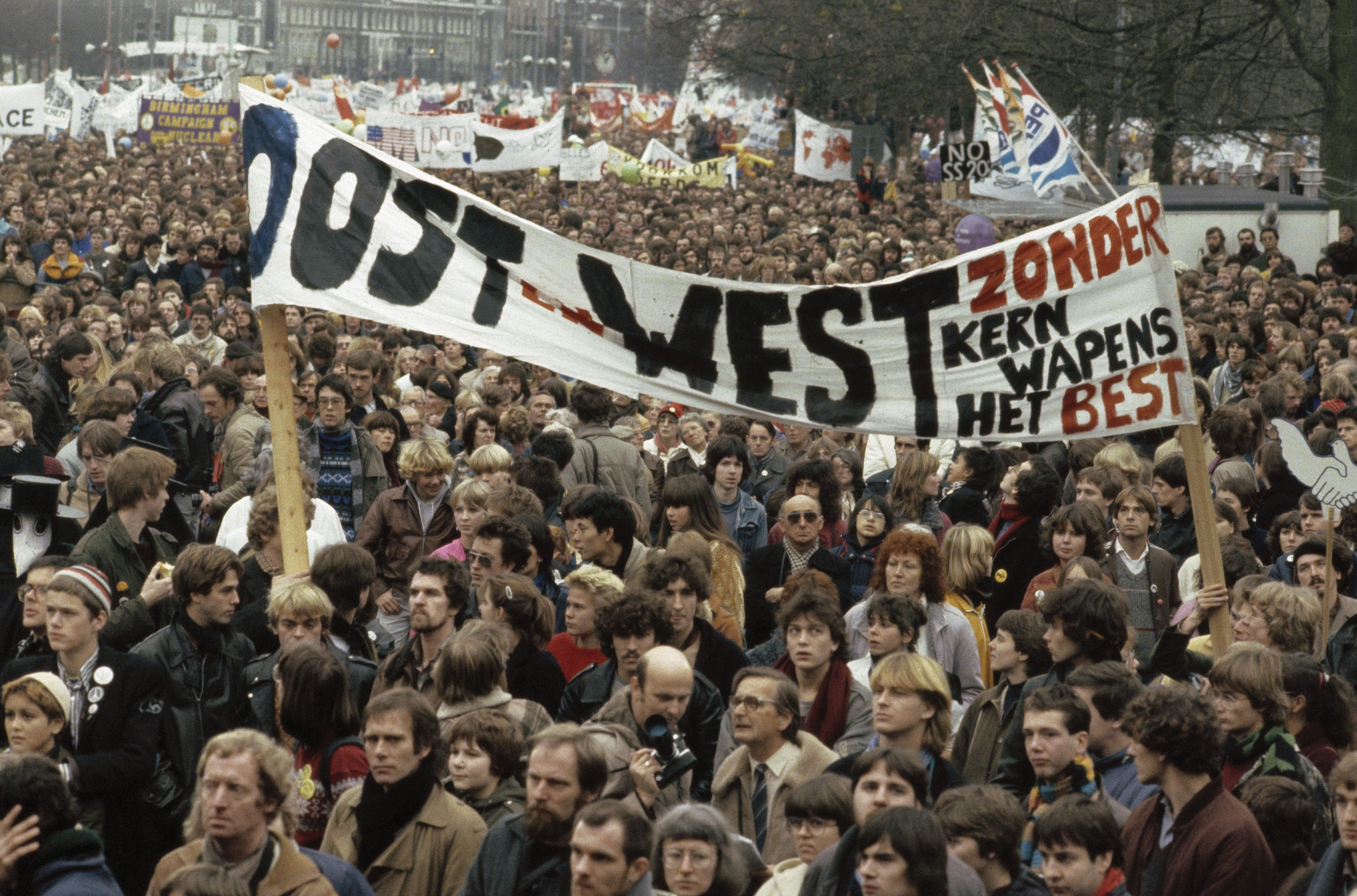
Protest in Amsterdam against the deployment of Pershing II missiles in Europe, 1981

The cultural revolution of the 1960s and 1970s made Amsterdam the magisch centrum (magical center) of Europe. The use of soft drugs was tolerated and this policy made the city a popular destination for hippies. The period 1966–1986, however, was described by Geert Mak as the "twenty years' urban war" (twintigjarige stadsoorlog): an extended period of social struggle between the city's radical youth and its government. The war started with the appearance of the local anarchist movement, Provo, so called because it liked to provoke authorities and bourgeois society with (non-violent) happenings and Dada-inspired absurdism. The Amsterdam police struck back at Provo with force; Mak explains the extreme police violence by reference to events in the direct aftermath of World War II, when the resistance proved unable to replace the Nazi-friendly head of police with their own candidate, thus leaving police power in authoritarian hands.

After the disbanding of Provo, new movements arose, including the green Kabouters and the squatters' movement. The latter raised the question of "who owns the city" and took direct action to show their stance on this issue, opposing speculators' claims to land in the face of housing deficits. Tensions escalated to the point where the army was called in to clear streets of barricades and in 1980, street fights took place in the center between police and large numbers of squatters and their sympathizers, at the very moment that Queen Beatrix's coronation was taking place inside the New Church on Dam square - see Amsterdam coronation riots for more. The loss of public sympathy stemming from this event eventually led to the downfall of the squatter movement, and by the mid-1980s it was effectively marginalized.

== 21st century ==
Amsterdam is the constitutional capital of the Netherlands. The Hague is the political center with the Dutch government, the parliament, the supreme court, the Council of State, the work palace of the monarch, and embassies.

=== Tourism and metro ===
Amsterdam has many tourist attractions. In the early 21st century, Amsterdam-Centrum attracted large numbers of tourists with campaigns such as I Amsterdam. Between 2012 and 2015, 3000 hotel rooms were built while Airbnb added 11.000 accommodations. The annual number of visitors rose from 10 million to 17 million. Real estate prices surged which made the city center unaffordable for most inhabitants, while local shops were replaced by tourist-oriented ones. These developments evoke comparisons with Venice which is overwhelmed by overtourism.

Construction of metro Line 52 (aka North/Southline) connecting Amsterdam-Noord to Centrum started in 2003. This project is controversial since the costs exceeded the budget threefold by 2008. There were concerns of damaging buildings in Centrum, and construction halted and restarted multiple times. The opening ceremony with the mayor, Femke Halsema, occurred on 21 July 2018.

=== Urban renewal ===
Since 2014, focus has been given to urban renewal. In particular areas directly bordering Centrum such as Frederik Hendrikbuurt. This urban renewal and expansion of the traditional city center is part of the Structural Vision Amsterdam 2040 initiative. Several neighborhoods are being built to reduce the housing shortage. Former port areas are redeveloped to residential such as the Houthaven, Overhoeks (former Shell area) and NDSM (former shipyard). Artificial islands were built such as Zeeburgereiland (Sluisbuurt), and IJburg (Haveneiland, Centrumeiland, Strandeiland, Rieteilanden, Buiteneiland).

The population rose to 931,298 in January 2024.

By the end of 2024, the municipality of Amsterdam has a debt of €6.9 billion. This will increase due to investments in the city to €8.9 billion by 2028. The net debt ratio of the standard debt (excluding leasehold) will increase from 54% in 2023 to 82% in 2028.

== Culture ==
Coat of arms of Amsterdam. The three crosses are thought to suggest the three plagues which have affected the city: flood, fire, and pestilence.

In the 15th and 16th century, cultural life in Amsterdam consisted mainly of festivals. During the later part of the 16th century, Amsterdams Rederijkerskamer (Chamber of Rhetoric) organized contests between different Chambers in the reading of poetry and drama. In 1638, Amsterdam got its first theatre. Ballet performances were given in this theatre as early as 1642. In the 18th century, French theater became popular. Opera could be seen in Amsterdam from 1677, first only Italian and French operas, but in the 18th century German operas. In the 19th century, popular culture was centered on the Nes area in Amsterdam (mainly vaudeville and music hall). The metronome, one of the most important advances in European classical music, was invented here in 1812 by Dietrich Nikolaus Winkel. At the end of this century, the Rijksmuseum and Stedelijk Museum Amsterdam were built. In 1888, the Concertgebouworkest was established. With the 20th century came cinema, radio, and television. Though the studios are in Hilversum and Aalsmeer, Amsterdam's influence on programming is very strong. After World War II, popular culture became the dominant cultural phenomenon in Amsterdam. The first official same-sex marriage in the world was held in Amsterdam.

Amsterdam is ranked as a leading sin city due to the widely available adult entertainment such as legalized prostitution, brothels, strip clubs, sex shops, sex shows, and cannabin consumption at coffeeshops. De Wallen is a famous red-light district around the Oudezijds Achterburgwal in Amsterdam-Centrum.

Amsterdam is a popular setting for Dutch and foreign films.

In March 2024, King Willem-Alexander held a speech at the opening of the Dutch National Holocaust Museum. The ceremony was controversial due to the attendance of the President of Israel, Isaac Herzog. The thousand or so protesters targeted Herzog's presence, rather than the opening of the museum. Police kept the protesters at a hearable distance from the ceremony.

== Geographic history ==
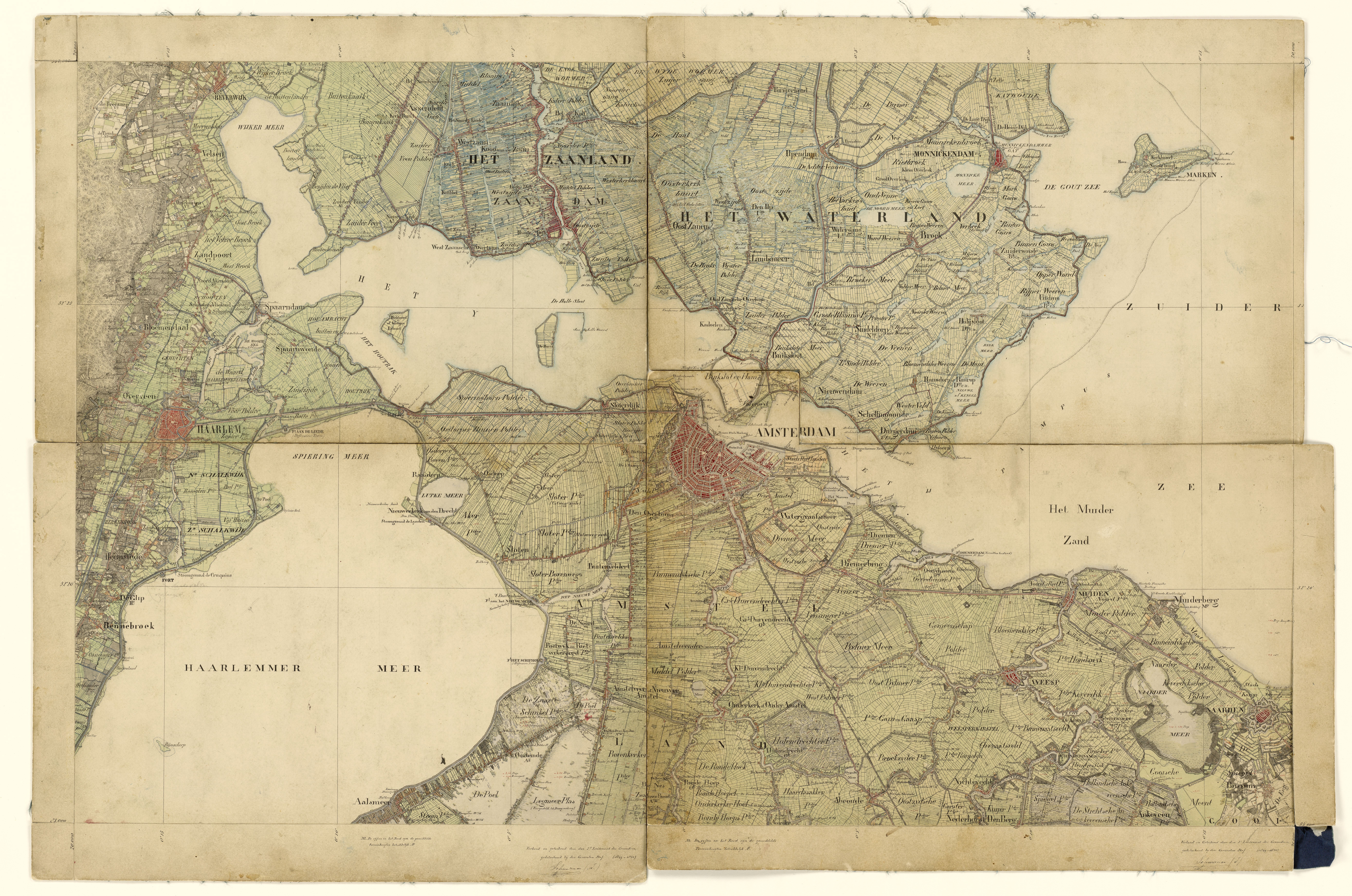
Amsterdam and surroundings in 1850. The city was still within the ramparts along the Singelgracht. The large bodies of water, the Haarlemmermeer and the IJ, were not drained yet. A large part of the rural green area has since been built on.

Amsterdam is famous for its many canals in the city center and other boroughs. In 2022, the city had 165 canals with a combined length of 75 km (47 mi). There are more canals than Venice and Paris. The canals divide the city into small islands that are connected by over 1200 bridges. The Torensluis built in 1648 is the oldest bridge that has been preserved in its original state. It took 400 years to build the Grachtengordel. It is a UNESCO World Heritage Site for its unique urban development, water management and innovative engineering. It is the so-called Venice of the North. The city has a close connection with water via the Amstel river, the IJ waterfront, the North Sea Canal and the IJmeer. The polders are essential for the city's existence.

The terrain around Amsterdam was historically swampy wilderness full of low and watery land. These soft banks of peat were drained by the early settlers by digging ditches and removing material. The inhabitants devised a system of dikes, canals and locks to drain the pieces of land to create polders. The reclaimed land shaped Amsterdam into the city we know today. The construction of the polders around Amsterdam was a huge undertaking that required technical ingenuity and perseverance. The windmills pumped water out of the polders to enable agriculture and later urban development.

By the 17th century, much land had already been reclaimed in and around Amsterdam. However, a few big lakes remained: the Haarlemmermeer, Bijlmermeer, Diemermeer and the smaller Houtrak, Ookmeer, Slootermeer, and the swampy Zieke Water. The Diemermeer was drained in 1629. It's now the neighborhood Watergraafsmeer. The Bijlmermeer was drained in 1626. The Slootermeer was drained in 1644. The Zieke Water was an inlet of the IJ which was enclosed by a quay in 1700. The Haarlemmermeer was drained by steam mills from 1848 till 1 July 1852. The Houtrak polder was drained in 1873. The Ookmeer was drained by a polder windmill in 1874.

The construction of the North Sea Canal made the IJ much thinner. In Amsterdam-Noord, below the former polder village Buiksloot were watery inlets of the IJ. Buiksloot was mostly destroyed after a dramatic dike breach in 1514. Thereafter, the IJ inlets were reclaimed as Nieuwendammerham and Buiksloterham. The village Nieuwendam was built more inland on a new dike.

The polders form the urban landscape and life of the city. They were essential for the city's expansion with new neighborhoods and urban green spaces.

The ground beneath the city is very soft so most buildings have deep foundations with long poles that reach the solid layer of sand. Buildings before 1925 are usually built on wooden poles with a stone foundation. The wooden poles deteriorate and require maintenance. Modern buildings have improved foundation codes with concrete poles. Centraal Station was built on 8,687 poles in 1889. In 2022, the whole city had an estimated 11 million poles.

== History of the municipality ==
For several centuries the municipality of Amsterdam consisted of the center and the immediate surroundings. When the city grew fast it required additional land to accommodate companies, shipyards and new neighborhoods. Several neighbouring municipalities were annexed:

- Sloten (covering the villages of Sloten, Sloterdijk, and Osdorp, in the west), annexed in 1921
- Buiksloot, annexed in 1921, now part of Amsterdam-Noord
- Nieuwendam (covering Nieuwendam and Zunderdorp), annexed in 1921, now part of Amsterdam-Noord
- Ransdorp (covering Ransdorp, Schellingwoude, Durgerdam, and Holysloot), annexed in 1921, now part of Amsterdam-Noord
- Watergraafsmeer, annexed in 1921
- a part of Nieuweramstel (covering the village of Buitenveldert)
- a part of Weesperkarspel (covering the Bijlmermeer and the village of Driemond), annexed in 1966, now Amsterdam-Zuidoost
- Weesp, annexed as an urban area (stadsgebied) in 2022, bordering Amsterdam-Zuidoost.

In 1995, the national government proposed the creation of a 'city province', consisting of Amsterdam and neighbouring towns. This proposal was rejected by the people in a referendum. The opposition was not so much against creating a city province as it was against splitting the city into parts. The opponents feared this would destroy the city's cohesion. After the referendum, the city province proposal was shelved. Nevertheless, since 1995, city parts have gradually become more autonomous, and neighbouring towns have been drawn politically and economically into the city.

== See also ==
- Boroughs of Amsterdam
- Canals of Amsterdam
- History of the Jews in Amsterdam
- History of the Netherlands
- List of museums in Amsterdam
- Timeline of Amsterdam
