= List of mass shootings in the Netherlands =

This article is a list of mass shootings in the Netherlands, including its constituent countries and special municipalities in the Dutch Caribbean. Mass shootings are firearm-related violence with at least four casualties.

The data includes casualties of perpetrators, including self-inflicted gunshot or shooting of a perpetrator by police. The treatment of perpetrator casualties is at variance to some but not all definitions of a mass shooting used in the United States. The inclusion of injured victims in the data is also at variance with some of the US definitions that only include dead victims. However, the above treatment is consistent with that used in other Wikipedia lists of mass shootings by country.

== 21st century ==
Date	Location	Dead	Injured	Total	Description
18 February 2025	Sint Maarten	0	4	4	Police found three people with gunshot wounds. A fourth person wounded in the same incident transported themselves to the hospital.
28 July 2024	Sint Maarten	0	5	5	Five people were injured, including musician Plumpy Boss, in a shooting at a concert.
14 April 2024	Sint Maarten	1	3	4	A man was killed and three other people wounded near a nightclub.
6 May 2022	Alblasserdam	2	2	4	A man opened fire at a care farm in Alblasserdam, killing a 34 year old woman and a 16 year old girl and wounding a 12 year old boy and a 20 year old woman. After fleeing, he was arrested in a nearby park.
18 March 2019	Utrecht	4	2	6	Utrecht tram shooting: A man shot 6 people on a tram in Utrecht in an act of Islamic extremism.
13 November 2018	Enschede	4	0	4	Gang related shooting.
7 August 2017	Curacao	4	6	10	Gang related shooting.
9 November 2014	Amsterdam	0	4	4	A shooter wounded four people at a café in Amsterdam-Zuidoost.
15 July 2014	Curaçao	2	7	9	Two gang members were killed and seven bystanders wounded in a drive-by shooting at Curaçao International Airport.
1 October 2011	Groningen	0	4	4	A local man shot and wounded four people.
16 May 2011	Zwijndrecht	3	1	4	A man shot and killed his ex-partner, her mother and her sister. The ex-partners father was injured in the attack. The man had shot and killed another ex-partner four days before on May 12, 2011.
9 April 2011	Alphen aan den Rijn	7 (Note: Including the perpetrator(s) or suspect(s))	17	24	Alphen aan den Rijn shopping mall shooting: A gunman opened fire in a shopping mall resulting in seven deaths, including the gunman. Three other malls were evacuated after a note written by the gunman stated that explosives were planted there.
22 August 2009	Hook of Holland	1	6	7	A man was killed and six others injured during a fight. The fatality and at least two of the injured were shot by police.
11 April 2009	Rotterdam	1	3	4	A man shot at people inside a café after being kicked out, killing one person and wounding three others before being overpowered.
4 March 2007	Enschede	1	4	5	A woman was killed and four people injured in the city centre.
18 November 2005	Rotterdam	3	1	4	Robbery of cafe.
6 February 2005	Rotterdam	0	5	5	A gunman opened fire, wounding five people.

== 20th century ==
Date	Location	Dead	Injured	Total	Description
7 December 1999	Veghel	0	5	5	A 17-year-old student opened fire in a computer room at ROC De Leijgraaf in an attempted honor killing, wounding a teacher and four students.
10 April 1999	The Hague	1	3	4	A man was killed and three others injured inside a vehicle.
13 February 1998	Rotterdam	0	5	5	Five people were injured in a shooting on the Rotterdam Metro.
23 February 1997	Heerhugowaard	2	7	9	A doorman and a customer were killed and seven others injured.
30 November 1996	Rembrandtplein	1	4	5	Gang related shooting.
5 April 1983	Delft	6	4	10	A man opened fire in a café and killed six people, including a child, and wounded four others.
13 July 1982	Gouda	0	4	4	Four people were injured.
23 May 1977	De Punt	8	6	14	1977 Dutch train hijacking: A train was hijacked by nine armed Moluccan nationalists and took over 50 people are taken hostage. The hijacking lasted 20 days and ended with a raid by Dutch counter-terrorist special forces, during the shootout two hostages and six hijackers were killed.
7 May 1945	Amsterdam	32+	100+	132+	1945 shooting on Dam square, Amsterdam: During the liberation of Amsterdam on 7 May 1945, in the last days of World War II, German soldiers fired machine guns into a large crowd gathered on Dam square to celebrate the end of the war, killing over 30 people.
