= 1945 Dam Square shooting =

Massacre of Amsterdam civilians at the end of WWII

Coordinates: 52°22′23″N 4°53′33″E

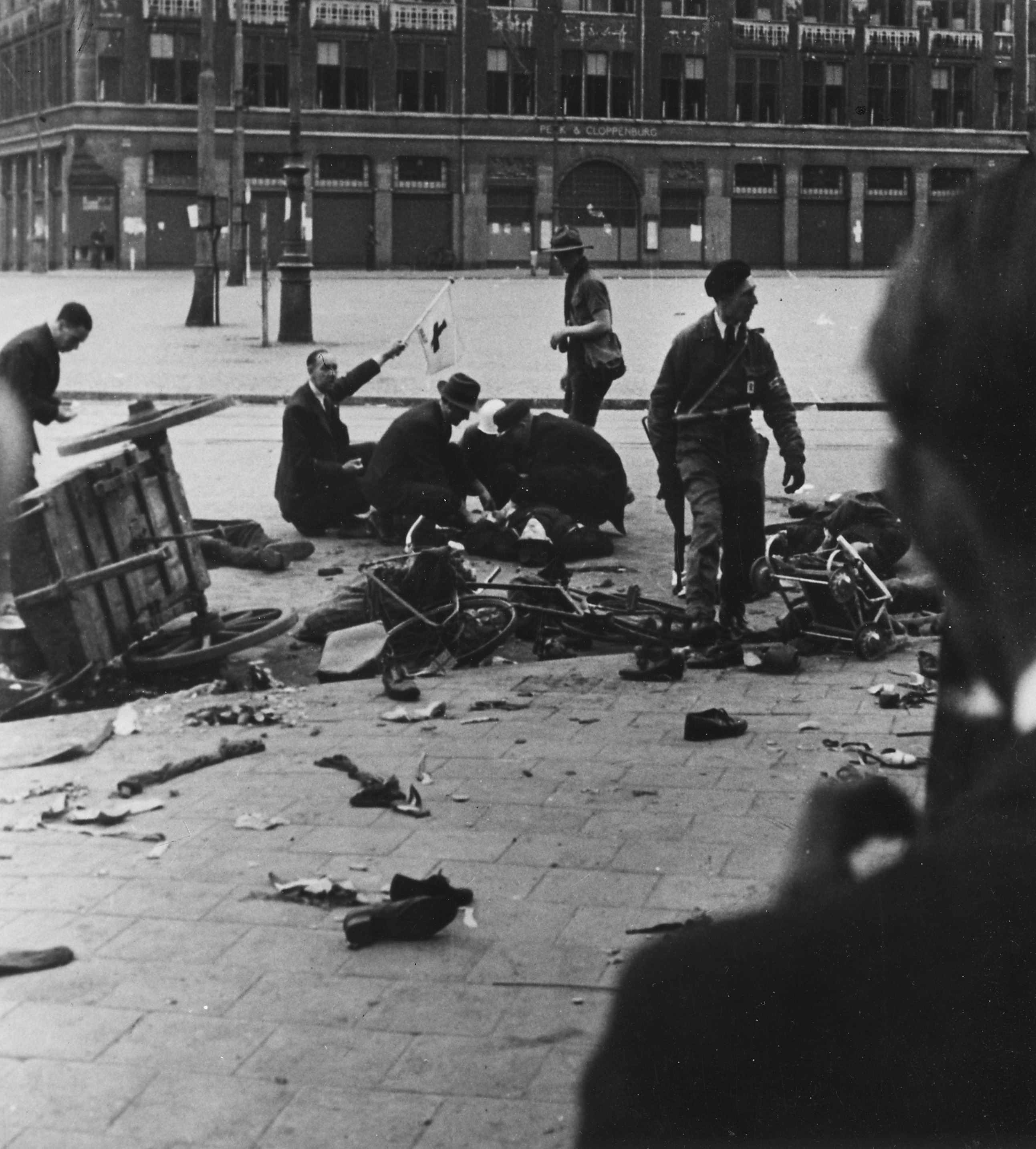
Panic on Dam square, 7 May 1945

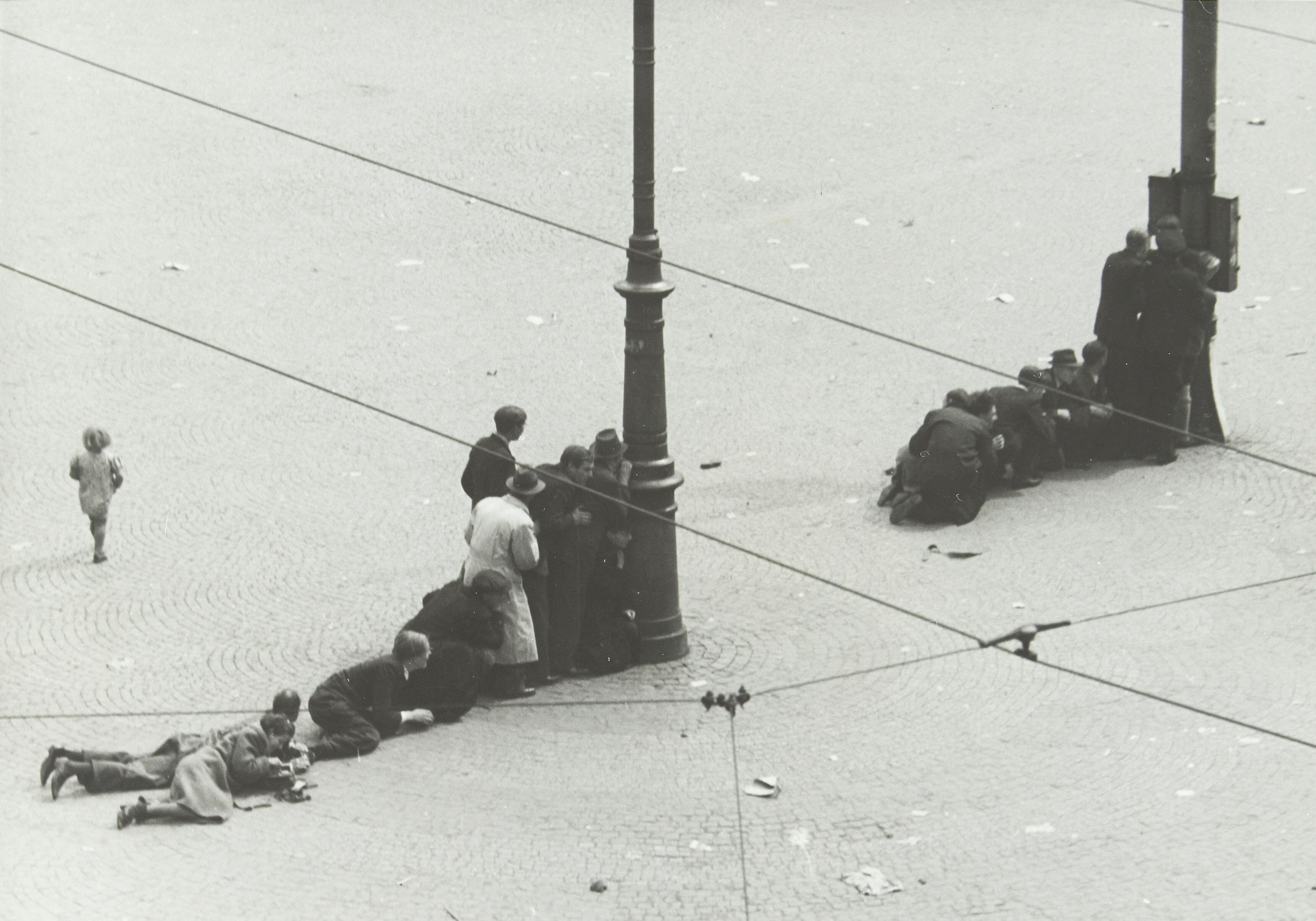
People seek cover behind street lights on Dam square. A small girl, Tiny van der Hoek, walks away, apparently upset that her ice-cream has fallen on the ground.

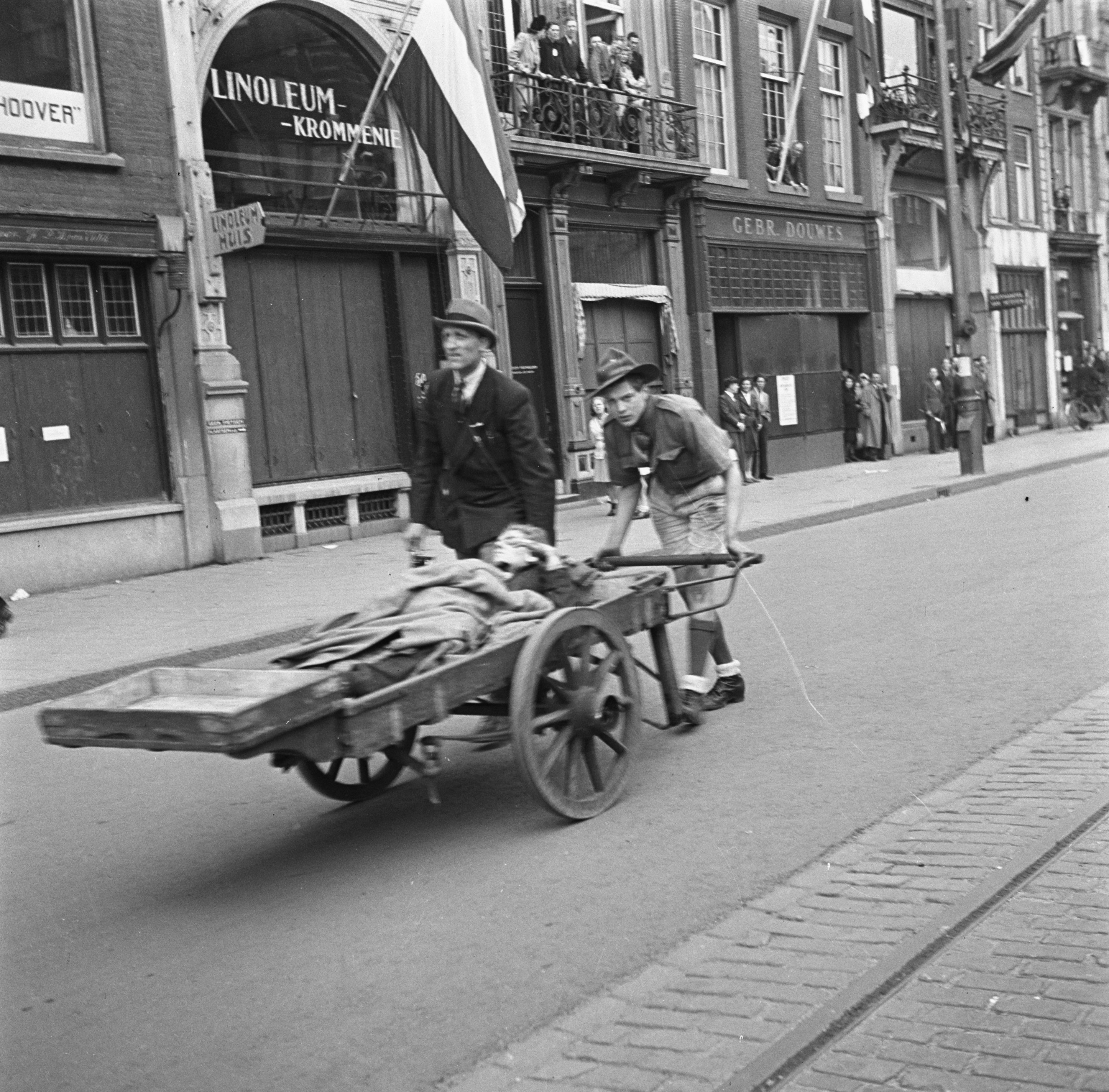
A shooting victim is taken away

The 1945 shooting on Dam square took place during the liberation of Amsterdam on 7 May 1945, in the last days of World War II in Europe. German soldiers fired machine guns into a large crowd gathered in Dam Square to celebrate the end of the war, killing over 30 people.

== Background ==
The German forces in the Netherlands surrendered to the Allies on 5 May 1945. However, the western part of the country remained occupied by the Germans until Allied troops could arrive to disarm them. Local newspapers reported on 6 May that Canadian forces would reach Amsterdam the next day.

On 7 May, thousands of people gathered on the Dam, the central square of the city, to celebrate the end of the war and welcome the Allied soldiers. Shortly after noon, a handful of Humber Armoured Cars of the British 49th (West Riding) Infantry Division, led by Acting-Lieutenant Colonel Richard Taite, began to approach the Dam by way of the Rokin to carry out reconnaissance. A convoy of German vehicles, also carrying out reconnaissance, narrowly passed the British vehicles near the Dam, but quickly disappeared again. The British force, having carried out their task, drove out of the city via the Rokin to wait until reinforcements had arrived. Meanwhile the Dutch resistance (Binnenlandse Strijdkrachten) had successfully disarmed most of the Germans, without much trouble. By midday they had taken possession of three key locations: the Royal Palace, the main money office and the main post office (Operation Three Castles).

== Shooting ==
While the local citizens celebrated on Dam square, German sailors of the Kriegsmarine were residing inside the Groote Club (Grand Club) building, a large building at the corner of the Dam and Kalverstraat. In the nearby Paleisstraat, local forces arrested two German soldiers. One of them refused to surrender his weapon and fired a shot. German soldiers then appeared in the windows, on the balcony and on the roof of the Groote Club and started firing into the crowd with machine guns.

Large-scale panic broke out on Dam square and most of the crowd dispersed via the Nieuwendijk, Rokin and Damrak. Some people sought cover behind street lights and other objects, including a barrel organ known as 't Snotneusje and a small truck.

After the initial shots, the Germans and resistance forces began to exchange fire. In total, the shooting lasted about two hours, until about 5pm. Members of the Scouts, Red Cross and nurses attempted to aid the victims. According to some sources, Major Carel Frederik Overhoff, who commanded the local forces, persuaded a German officer, Hauptmann Bergmann, to join him in entering the Groote Club and ordering the German soldiers to cease fire. In another version of events, the shooting had already ended by the time they reached the Groote Club, after local forces had fired bazooka rockets at the building, or threatened to do so. The German soldiers at the Groote Club remained there until they were taken into custody by Canadian forces on 9 May and taken back to Germany.

German and local forces also exchanged fire at Amsterdam Centraal station that day, causing the death of two Dutch soldiers and a number of German soldiers.

In the evening Richard Taite led a detachment of his squadron into the city centre a few hours after the shooting. At sunset, Taite reached the Royal Palace of Amsterdam, and there he received the surrender of the German Ortskommandant Oberstleutnant Hans A. Schröder, in preparation for its occupation by the First Canadian Army the following day.

== Aftermath ==
The day after the shooting, on 8 May, Canadian forces entered the city. Tens of thousands gathered on Dam square on 9 May to celebrate the liberation and listen to speeches by Prime Minister Gerbrandy and others.

The shooting was never fully investigated. After the event, local newspapers reported between 19 and 22 fatalities, but no official list of casualties was ever released. Stichting Memorial voor Damslachtoffers 7 mei 1945, an organisation founded to commemorate the event, has since identified a total of 32 people who died as a result of the event, not including German casualties. Twenty-six died immediately while five more died later of gunshot wounds. The last known victim died on 22 June. The actual number of fatalities may be higher; in some cases, it had not yet been determined whether the death was related to the Dam square shootout. The full number of wounded is also unknown; newspaper reports gave between 100 and 120 wounded.

== Remembrance ==
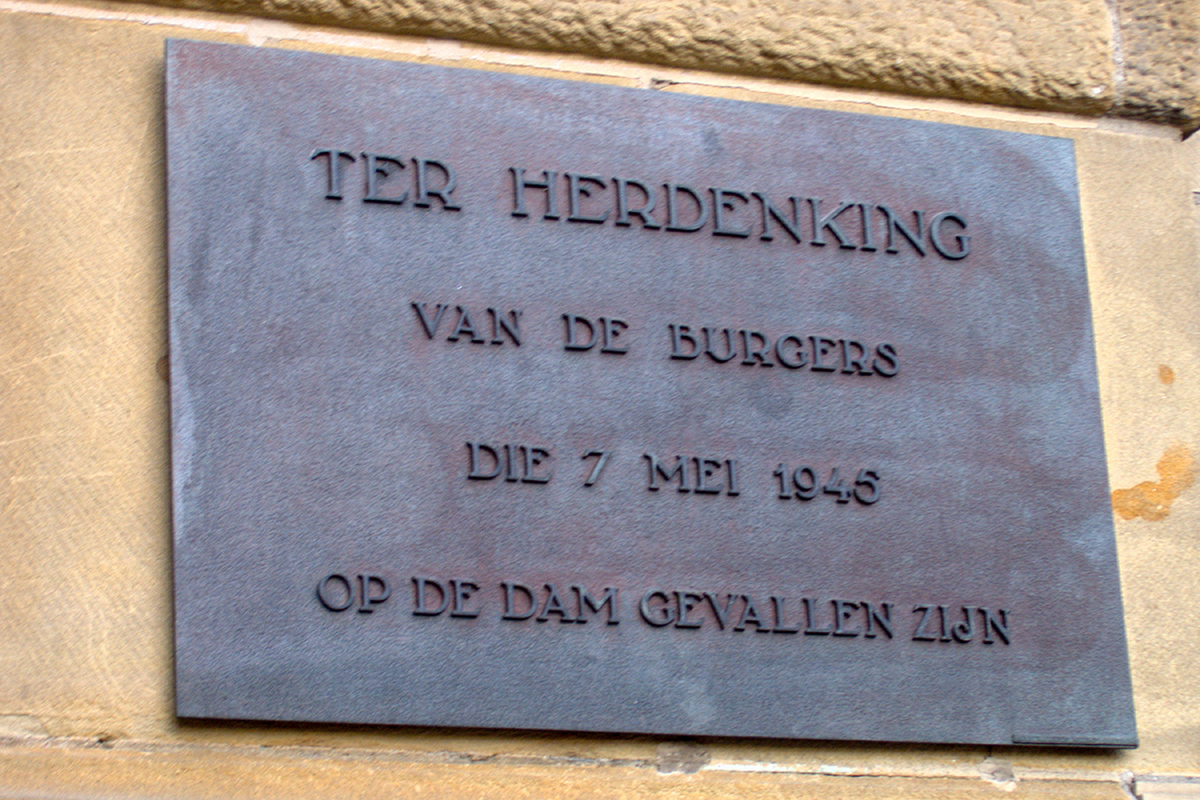
Commemorative plaque at the Groote Club, corner of Dam and Kalverstraat

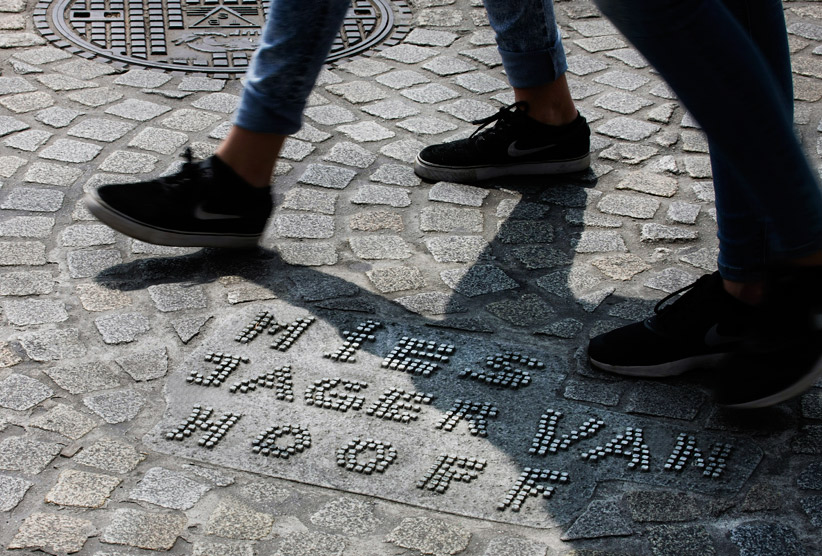
One of the 32 name stones on Dam square in remembrance of the victims of the shooting

Two years after the shooting, a commemorative plaque was unveiled on the facade of the Groote Club at the corner of the Dam and Kalverstraat.

Between June 2015 and March 2016, 15,509 virtual stones were placed on the website plaatseensteen.nl / placeastone.nl, shaping the letters of the victims' names. On 1 March 2016, the end result was transferred to stone reliefs and embedded in the pavement of Dam square. The memorial was unveiled by Mayor Eberhard van der Laan on 7 May 2016 following a ceremony in the Nieuwe Kerk church.

A national Remembrance of the Dead ceremony is held on Dam square every year on 4 May.

Carel Frederik Overhoff, who commanded the Dutch forces in Amsterdam on 7 May 1945, received the Military Order of William in 1947 for his efforts to put an end to the fighting, but the honour was rescinded in 1952 after Overhoff was convicted of embezzlement and imprisoned.

== See also ==
- History of Amsterdam
- Netherlands in World War II
- End of World War II in Europe
- Dolle Dinsdag
