= Richard Taite (cricketer) =

English cricketer and soldier

Personal information
- Full name: Richard Hamish Taite
- Born: 5 April 1911; Westminster, London, England
- Died: 5 April 1969 (aged 58); Huttons Ambo, Yorkshire, England
- Batting: Unknown
- Bowling: Unknown

Domestic team information
- Years: Team
- 1938/39: Europeans

Career statistics
Competition	First-class
Matches	1
Runs scored	38
Batting average	19.00
100s/50s	0/0
Top score	38
Balls bowled	72
Wickets	0
Bowling average	–
5 wickets in innings	–
10 wickets in match	–
Best bowling	–
Catches/stumpings	0/–
- Source: Cricinfo, 6 December 2023

Richard Hamish Taite OBE (5 April 1911 – 5 April 1969) was an English first-class cricketer and an officer in the British Army. Taite served in the army from 1931 until 1959, seeing action in both the Second World War and the Korean War. In May 1945, he was the officer who received the German surrender of Amsterdam, for which he was later decorated by the Dutch government. In cricket, Taite played first-class cricket in British India for the Europeans cricket team.

== Life and military service ==
The son of Geoffrey Taite and Natalie LeDoux, he was born at Westminster in April 1911. He was educated at Cheltenham College, where he played for the cricket and rugby teams. From there, he attended the Royal Military College at Sandhurst and graduated into the King's Own Royal Regiment (KORR) in August 1931, with promotion to lieutenant in August 1934. He was later seconded to serve in British India, where he was attached to the Madras-based Southern Provinces Mounted Rifles with the local rank of captain. While serving there, he made a single appearance in first-class cricket for the Europeans cricket team against the Indians at Madras in the 1938–39 Madras Presidency Match. Batting twice in the match, he top-scored with 38 in the Europeans first innings before being dismissed by Gopalaswami Parthasarathy, whilst in their second innings he was dismissed without scoring by C. R. Rangachari. With the ball, he bowled 12 wicketless overs in the Indians first innings.

Shortly after his lone first-class appearance, Taite returned to the KORR and was promoted to captain in August 1939. He served throughout the Second World War, taking part in the Normandy campaign with the 34th Armoured Brigade, where he saw action at the Battle of Le Havre in September 1944. In the last days of the war, Taite served with the 49th Reconnaissance Regiment. In April 1945, he took part in the Liberation of Arnhem, where it was noted that he commanded his squadron with skill, determination and courage; he had taken over the command of the squadron mid-battle, following the wounding of its commander. Following the Allied victory at Arnhem, Taite led his squadron against the Grebbe Line and thereafter organised German surrenders at Hilversum and Bussum. On the evening of e 7 May, he led a detachment of his squadron into Amsterdam, reaching the city centre hours after the shooting on Dam square, in which German soldiers killed 30 Dutch civilians. At sunset, Taite reached the Royal Palace of Amsterdam, and there he received the surrender of the German Ortskommandant Oberstleutnant Hans A. Schröder, in preparation for its occupation by the First Canadian Army the following day. For his actions in the Netherlands, he was decorated by the Dutch with the Bronze Lion in July 1947.

Ten months after the conclusion of the war, Taite was promoted to major in July 1946, with a further promotion to lieutenant colonel following in March 1952. He served in the Korean War, following which he was made an OBE in December 1953, in recognition of gallant and distinguished service during the war. He retired from active service in October 1959. Taite died in April 1969 at Huttons Ambo, Yorkshire; he was survived by his wife Cynthia (1914–2012), and their son Rodger and daughter Natalie.
