= Floradorp =

Coordinates: 52°23′57″N 4°54′58″E

- Neighborhood of Amsterdam
- Interactive map of Floradorp
- Country: Netherlands
- Province: North Holland
- COROP: Amsterdam
- Time zone: UTC+1 (CET)

Floradorp is a neighborhood of Amsterdam-Noord, Netherlands in the Dutch province of North Holland. The neighborhood is bordered in the north by the Buiksloterdijk (a dyke), in the east by the Noorderpark and the Noordhollandsch Kanaal, in the west by the Klaprozenweg (Poppies Road) and in the south by the Sneeuwbalstraat (Snowball Street) in the Bloemenbuurt. The majority of street names in both the Bloemenbuurt and Floradorp are named after flowers and plants. By the Noord borough, the neighborhood is classified as part of the Volewijck (a neighborhood).

Floradorp was built in the late 1920s by the municipality of Amsterdam, at a time when homes in the city centre were declared uninhabitable on a large scale, such as in the Uilenburg, Rapenburg (also an island) and the Jordaan. Plans were developed for public housing replacements.

The Bloemenbuurt, between the Sneeuwbalstraat and the Mosplein (Moss Square), and Floradorp formed the biggest part of Tuindorp Buiksloterham, one the many garden cities developed in Amsterdam between 1920 and 1940 to counterbalance the impoverished working-class neighborhoods in the city centre. The garden cities in the Watergraafsmeer, Buiksloot, Buiksloterham, Nieuwendam and Oostzaan are owed to the progressive aldermen Floor Wibaut and Salomon Rodrigues de Miranda, and the dynamism of Arie Keppler, director of the Amsterdam Municipal Housing Service.

== Uninhabitable declared homes ==
In the first quarter of the 20th century, there was a problematic housing shortage in Amsterdam. Although at the same time plans were being made to revitalise run-down neighborhoods in the city centre with new public housing. Hundreds of slum dwellings could only be declared uninhabitable once there was a reasonable alternative for the residents. In response, the municipality of Amsterdam planned to build multiple garden cities around the old parts of the city. Here, new homes were to be built in newly annexed neighbouring municipalities such as Buiksloot and Nieuwendam, so that Amsterdam could offer a new home.

== Low rent ==
In Floradorp, the municipality built houses in accordance with the Woningwet (Housing Act) for large families. These houses had three or four bedrooms which met the minimum standards. This made the homes eligible for a government grant and low rent, as the intended tenants had little to spend. The various rooms were no larger than the minimum dimensions. Along with the houses in Tuindorp Nieuwendam, the houses in the neighbouring Bloemenbuurt by housing association Zomers Buiten were among the first working-class houses in Amsterdam that did have a bathroom, but the rent of these houses were higher than people from the slums could pay. Zomers Buiten rented its houses primarily to skilled artisans with permanent positions at the municipality of Amsterdam.

Between the Klaprozenweg and Sneeuwbalstraat, the municipality built around 600 houses. The first 183 houses were completed in 1927 and the final ones in 1929. Only working-class houses were built, which were then rented out to working-class families by the Amsterdam Municipal Housing Service. Certain tenants came from Asterdorp, a village for "inadmissable" families, which was dissolved in 1940. In the centre of Floradorp, the Binnenhof was conceived. This place was formed by multiple houses with tented roofs, meant for older people. At this time, it was very uncommon that separate homes were built for the elderly. The construction of new homes in Floradorp were often the reason for various strikes and conflicts.

An overview from 1930 gives a clear view where the first residents of Floradorp came from: 144 from uninhabitable declared homes, 14 from expropriated homes, 72 from substandard homes, 202 from overcrowded homes, 123 from Obelt (same type of village as Asterdorp), 20 from Asterdorp, 6 from a houseboat, 22 lived with other tenants, 1 newlywed, 1 from outside Amsterdam and 1 public servant.

== Renovations ==
The Municipal Housing Service renovated Floradorp in the mid-1990s. The brick outer walls were given a pastel-coloured plaster coating, which got decorated with tiles. The plaster coating also acts as external wall insulation. The small homes at the Binnenhof were merged, losing their original location.

Content in this edit is translated from the existing Dutch Wikipedia article at nl:Floradorp; see its history for attribution.
