= Amsterdam-Noord =

Coordinates: 52°23′28″N 4°55′06″E

- Borough of Amsterdam
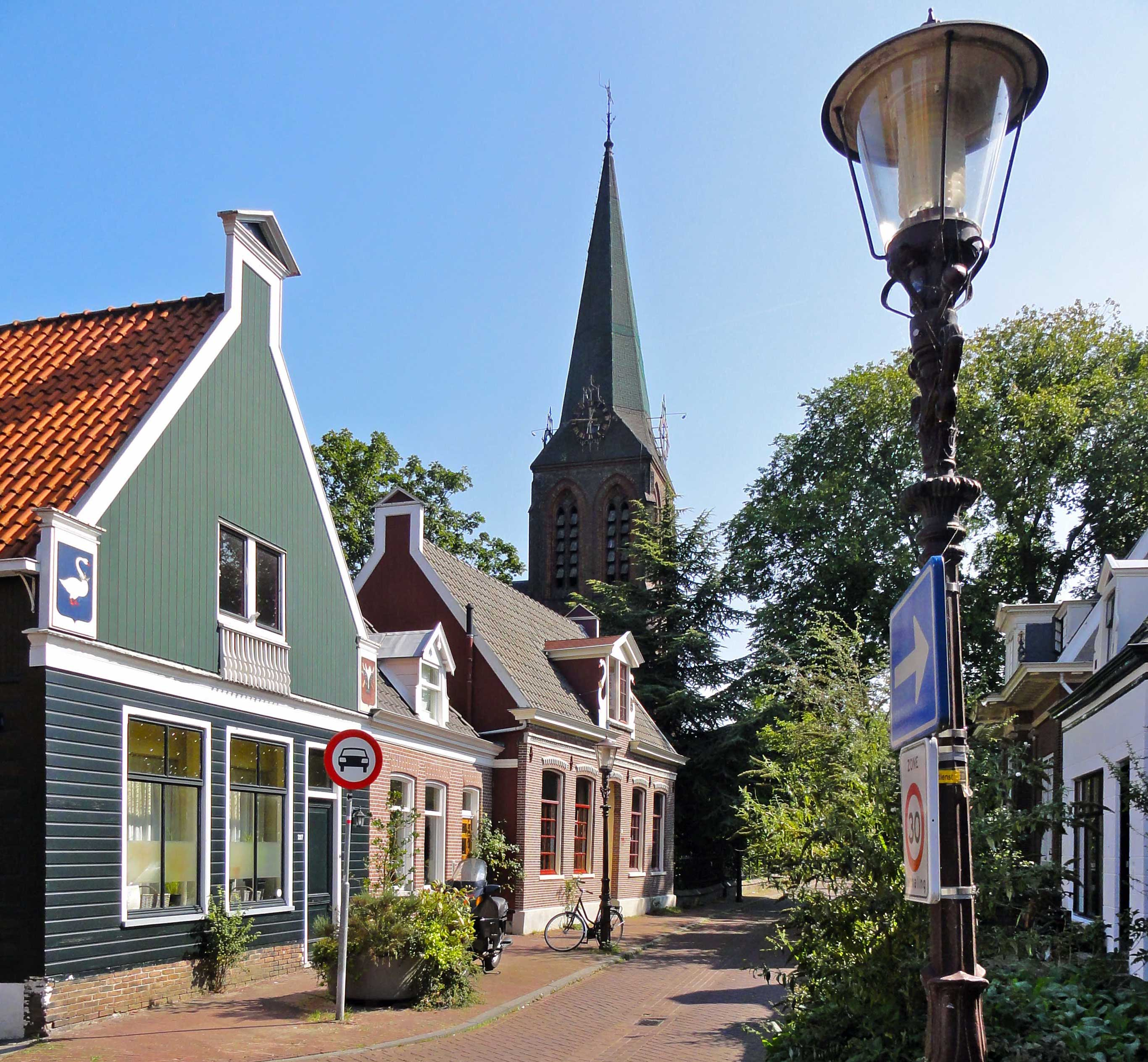
- View of Saint Augustine's Church in Nieuwendam, Amsterdam-Noord

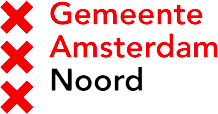
- Brandmark

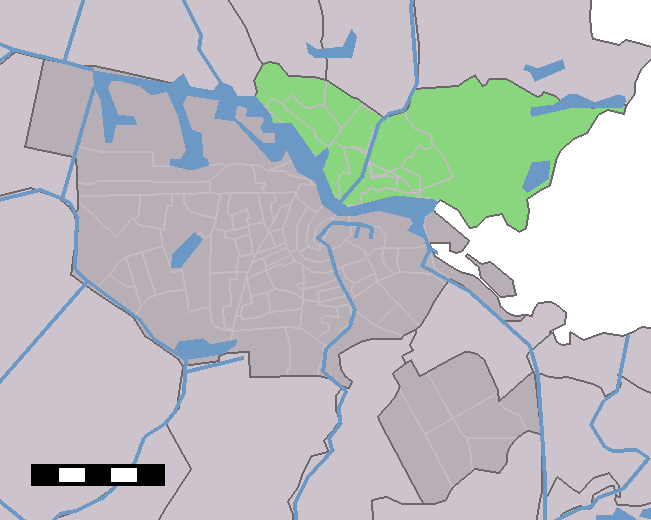
- Amsterdam-Noord (green) as part of Amsterdam
- Country: Netherlands
- Province: North Holland
- Municipality: Amsterdam

Area
  - Total: 49.01 km^{2} (18.92 sq mi)

Population (2015)
  - Total: 91,324
  - Density: 1,863/km^{2} (4,826/sq mi)
- Website: https://www.amsterdam.nl/stadsdelen/noord/

Amsterdam-Noord (Dutch pronunciation: [ˌɑmstərdɑmˈnoːrt]; English: North Amsterdam) is a borough of Amsterdam, Netherlands with a population of about 90,000. The IJ, the body of water which separates it from Amsterdam-Centrum and the rest of the city, is situated southwest of Amsterdam-Noord. The borough, which has an area of 49.01 km^{2} (18.92 sq mi), borders the municipalities of Zaanstad, Oostzaan, Landsmeer and Waterland to the north, all part of the province of North Holland like Amsterdam. It borders the Markermeer to the east.

Amsterdam-Noord is mostly home to families who prefer it to the expensive, touristy and crowded Centrum, West and Zuid boroughs. It remains geographically close to major city landmarks, including Amsterdam Centraal station, the Royal Palace and the Rokin. Amsterdam-Noord is best known for its typical wooden houses (mainly located in Schellingwoude and Nieuwendam), historical areas with a low population density (Landelijk Noord) and large open spaces (especially Durgerdam and Ransdorp).

== History ==
=== Background ===
Amsterdam north of the IJ originally consisted of the Volewijck peninsula, which the city was given control over in 1393 (right of craftsmanship; Dutch: recht van ambachtsheerlijkheid). Until 1795, Amsterdam-Noord was used as a gallows field, where the corpses of convicts were hung after the execution as a frightening example. In 1660, the digging of the Buikslotertrekvaart (literal translation: Buiksloter waterway) began just to the east of the Galgenveld, from the IJ north through Volewijck to Buiksloot, Broek in Waterland, Monnickendam, Edam and Hoorn. In order to complete this project securely, several areas of Amsterdam-Noord were surrounded by dams from 1662 onwards. To finance those works, a toll house was built, to which a small outlet was connected at the end of the 18th century.

The area that now forms Amsterdam-Noord has been intersected by the Noordhollandsch Kanaal since its competition in 1824, which on the south side via the Willemssluizen is connected to the IJ. The canal flows under the A10 motorway coming from Den Helder, and then goes through the Noorderpark (east of Buiksloot and west of Buikslotermeer) and Overhoeks. It was not until the 19th century that this area was urbanised; before construction began, the filling up of marshes with port sludge was necessary. That is how the Buiksloterham (1832–1851) and Nieuwendammerham (1879) came into existence.

=== Industrial period ===
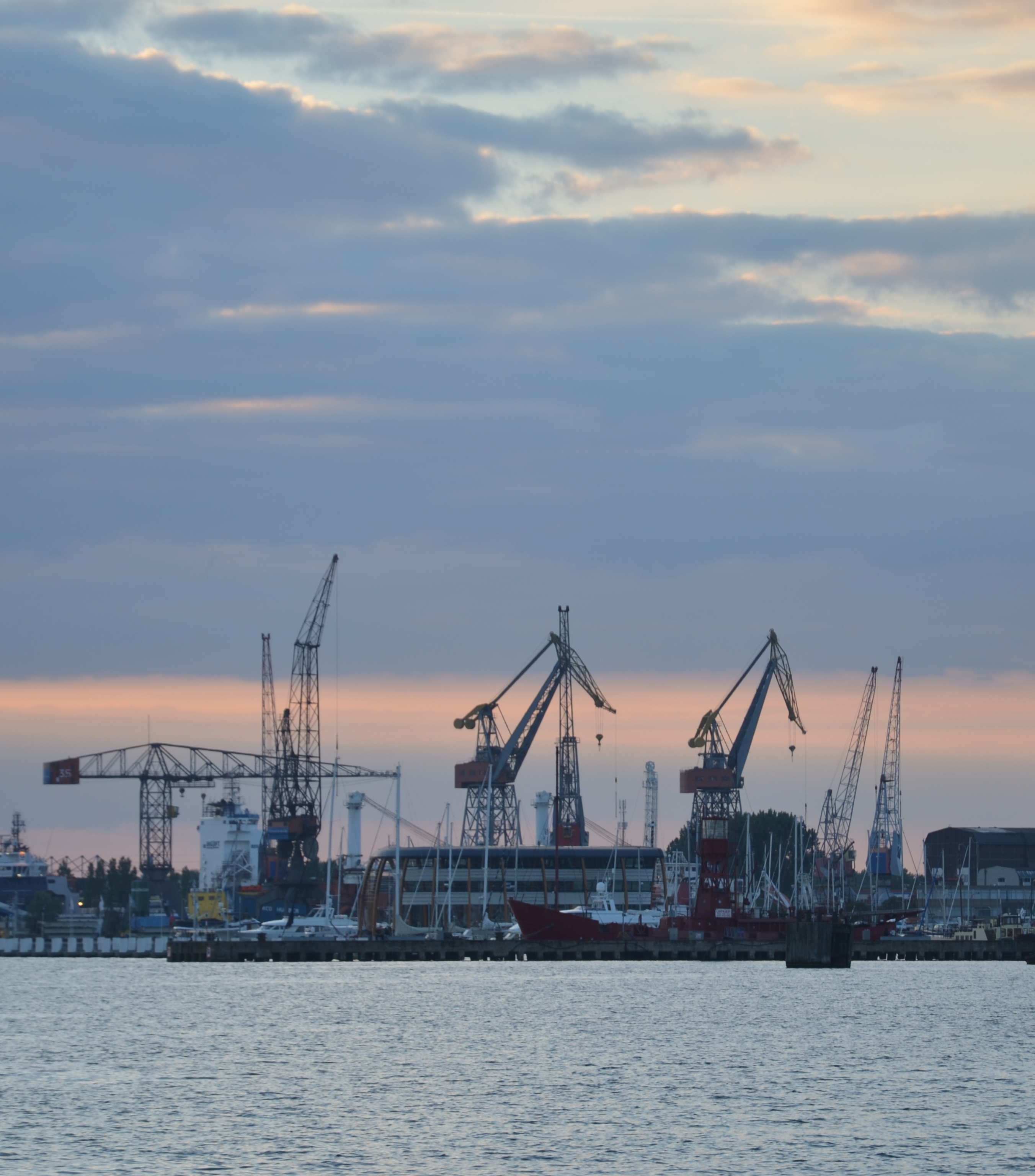
The NDSM-werf area has been subject to heavy urban renewal since the 2000s.

After the opening of the North Sea Canal in 1876, the port of Amsterdam became accessible to steamers. The municipality of Amsterdam voted to begin converting northern rural areas into industry fields, a policy which was started by the establishment of the Stoomvaartmaatschappij Nederland, Koninklijke Nederlandse Stoomboot-Maatschappij (KNSM) and others. The Amsterdam Drydock Company, founded on their initiative, built a ship repair yard on the north bank, and the Nederlandsche Dok en Scheepsbouw Maatschappij (NDSM) established a new shipyard. In 1900, the municipal council decided to move the sulfuric acid plant of Ketjen, which caused a great deal of disruption in Overtoom (Amsterdam-Zuid), to a new facility in Amsterdam-Noord. In 1908, the Kromhout shipbuilding factory also moved north of the IJ. In 1910, descendants of the Zaanstad manufacturing families Duijvis and Verkade founded the Drakafabriek for low-voltage cables, necessary for the electrification of the Netherlands.

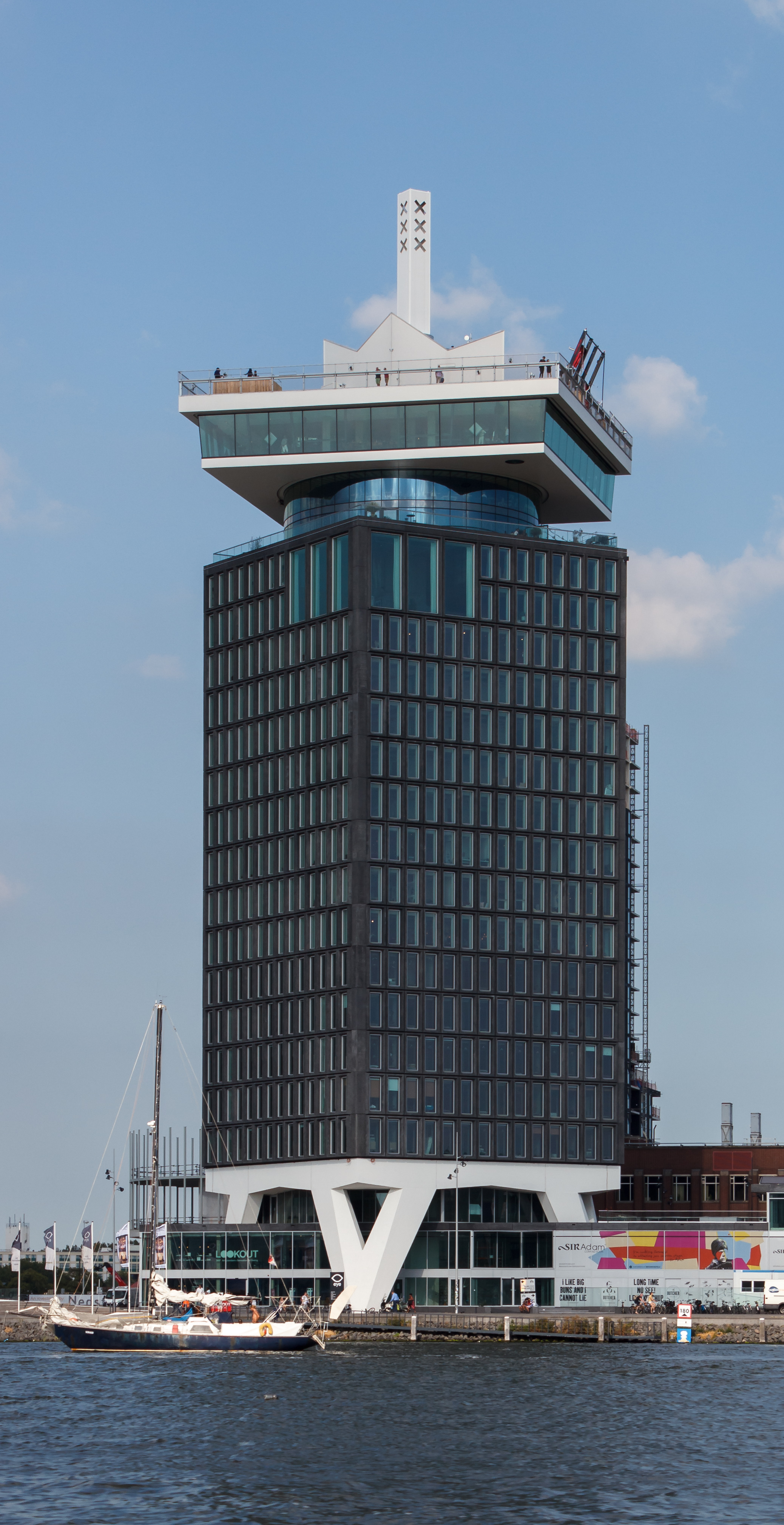
The A'DAM Toren was achieved in 1971 and has since been one of Amsterdam-Noord's main landmarks.

Many ferry services were needed to serve the staff of these companies on a daily basis, and a need arose for housing over the IJ. Due to a border change in 1877, Amsterdam's control was extended over the northern IJ bank to the Waterlandse Zeedijk. In 1900, Johan van Hasselt, the new director of the municipal Public Works Department, made a design for the development of Amsterdam-Noord. There was a lot of room for living and working in this design.

It provided space for heavy industry and port-related activity. The construction of a new main canal even required clearing the way for the construction of a bridge over the IJ connecting the area with the inner city. Van Hasselt was not aware of modern insights in public housing, and this led to various conflicts with the management of the municipal Building and Housing Service. They wanted to break with existing practices in Amsterdam, such as high-rise buildings of four or five storeys to accommodate workers.

The plan was considerably changed for residential construction in Amsterdam-Noord, but the area already attracted many companies. Those policies and Amsterdam-Noord's geographical situation attracted Anthony Fokker to establish his aircraft factory after the First World War. In the Nieuwendammerham, the way had already been cleared during this period for the construction of the Vogelbuurt by housing associations. A few years later, the new Municipal Housing Service in Amsterdam took over the construction of the neighbourhood in the Buiksloterham.

=== Second World War ===
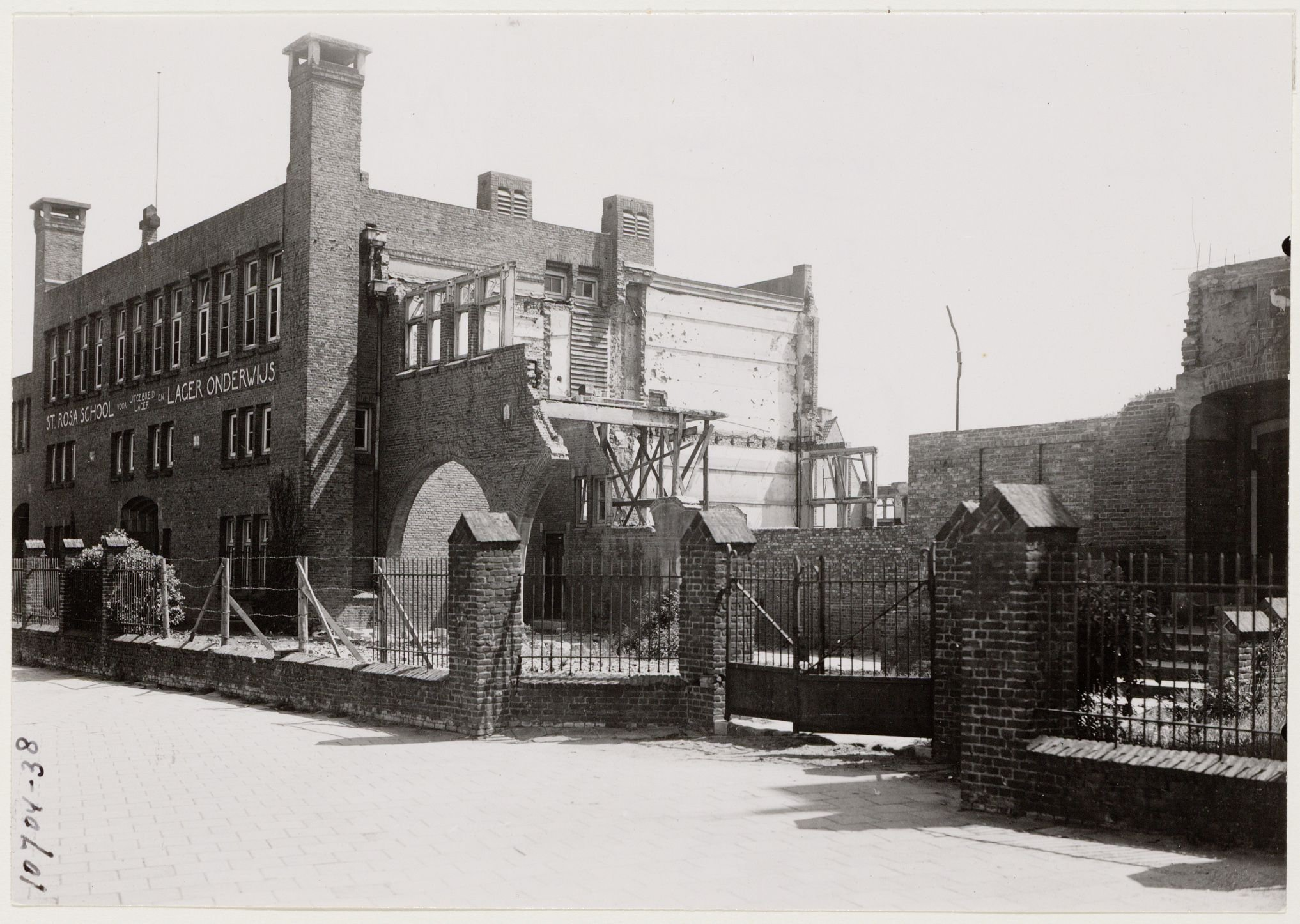
Sint Rosa-school after the accidental bombardment on the residential areas of Amsterdam-Noord in 1943.

In the Second World War the industry fields in Amsterdam-Noord were the target of the air bombings by the Allied Forces. The Fokker factories were the 17 July 1943 bombings' goal, but the bombs of the United States Army Air Forces fell on the surrounding residential areas, causing 158 deaths and 119 seriously injured as a result. The British’ Royal Air Force and Free French Air Forces both did another attempt to bomb the factory on 25 and 28 July, resulting in the death of 200 citizens in total by the three raids. Only the British Forces managed to bomb the targeted airplane factory, all other bombs fell on residential areas in Amsterdam-Noord. This is the heaviest air bombardment that ever hit Amsterdam. 106 houses were destroyed, 206 houses heavily damaged and 676 houses suffered glass and roof damage. Every year a memorial ceremony takes place on 17 July at De Nieuwe Noorder cemetery.

=== Recent years ===
In December 1981, Amsterdam-Noord and Osdorp became the first two districts of the municipality of Amsterdam to have their own elected district council and executive board. In April 2012, the EYE Film Institute Netherlands was officially transferred from the Vondelparkpaviljoen, Vondelpark to Overhoeks, Amsterdam-Noord following an inauguration by Queen Beatrix. This made the borough more culturally attractive, since the museum's new location is only two minutes away from the Centrum borough by ferry.

== Geography ==
=== Neighbourhoods ===
Amsterdam-Noord comprises the following neighbourhoods: Banne Buiksloot, Buiksloot, Buikslotermeer, Floradorp, Kadoelen, Molenwijk, Nieuwendam, Nieuwendammerdijk en Buiksloterdijk, Oostzanerwerf, Overhoeks, Tuindorp Nieuwendam and Tuindorp Oostzaan.

The special district of Landelijk Noord, which was established to ensure that the residents of the rural eastern part of Amsterdam-Noord received the same quality of service as those in the rest of the city, also comprises the Durgerdam, Holysloot, 't Nopeind, Ransdorp, Schellingwoude and Zunderdorp neighbourhoods. They are all former villages that are now part of the Amsterdam metropolitan area or villages that decided to merge with Amsterdam at the beginning of the 20th century to have more financial resources, but are still geographically separated from the city.

There are thus eighteen neighbourhoods in Amsterdam-Noord. Former neighbourhoods that merged into the current ones include Buiksloterham, IJplein en Vogelbuurt, Nieuwendammerham, Tuindorp Buiksloot, Van der Pekbuurt, Volewijck, Waterland and Waterlandpleinbuurt.

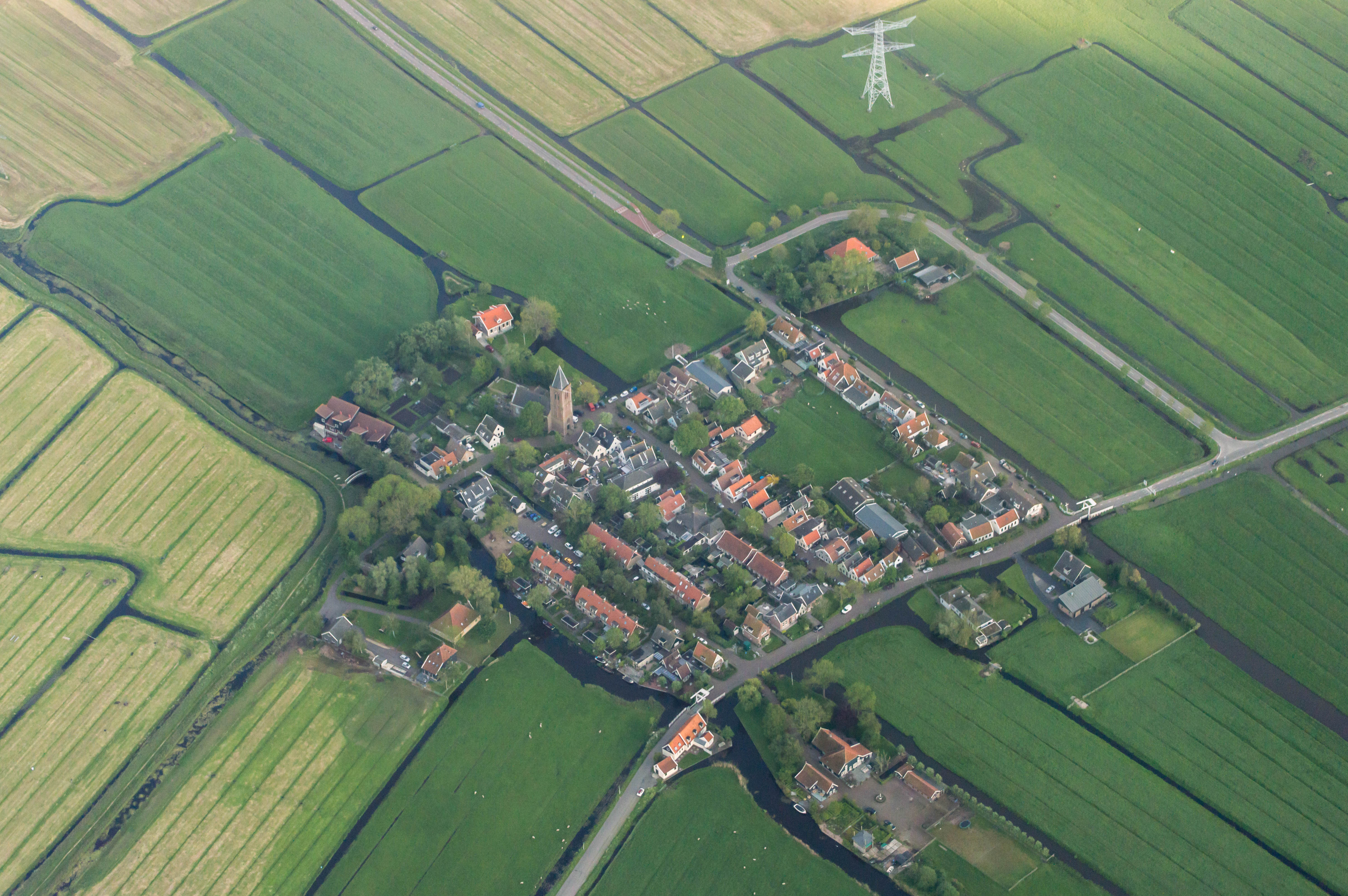
Zunderdorp, a village nowadays part of the municipality of Amsterdam

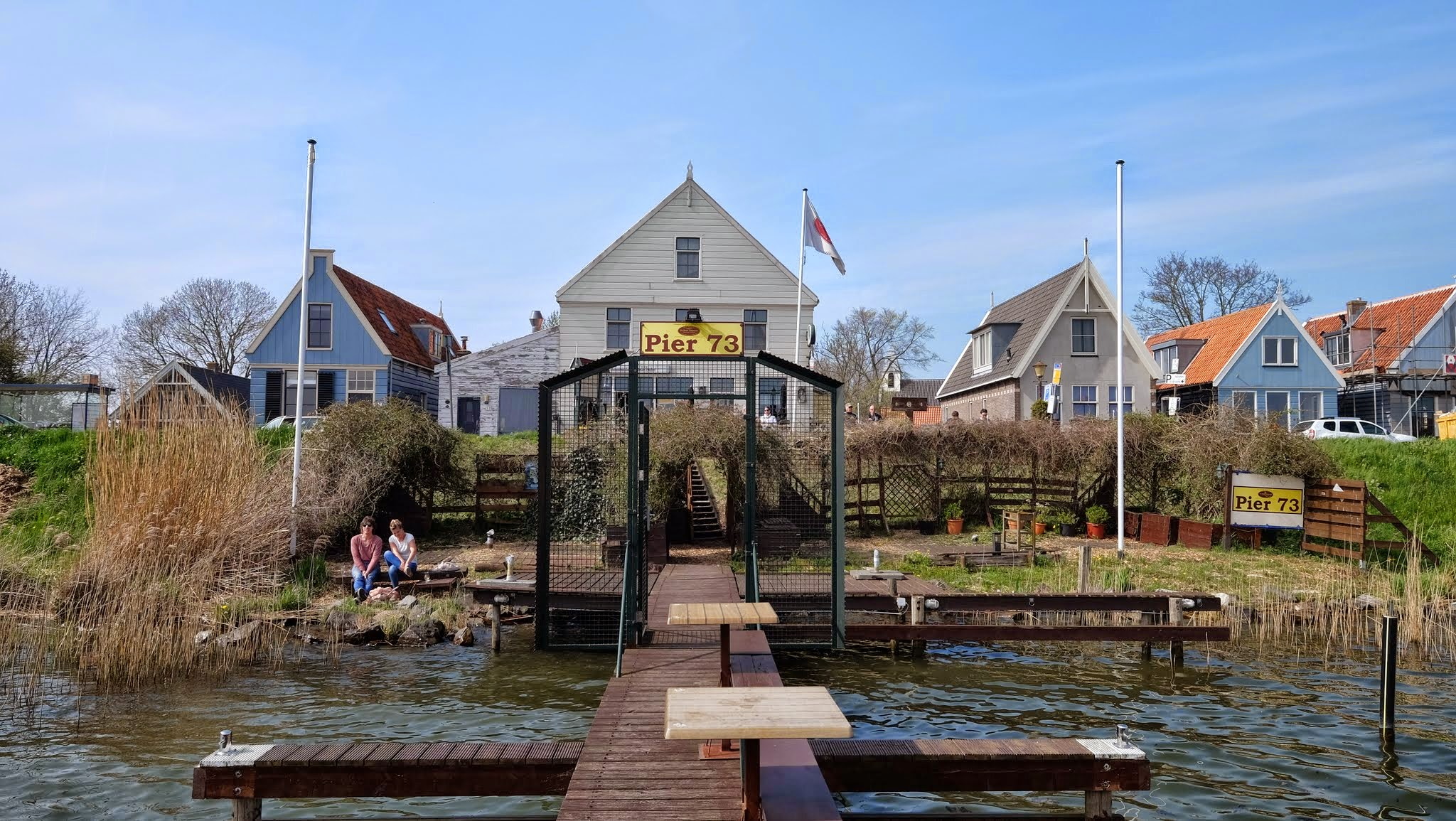
Durgerdam, located on the shore of the Markermeer

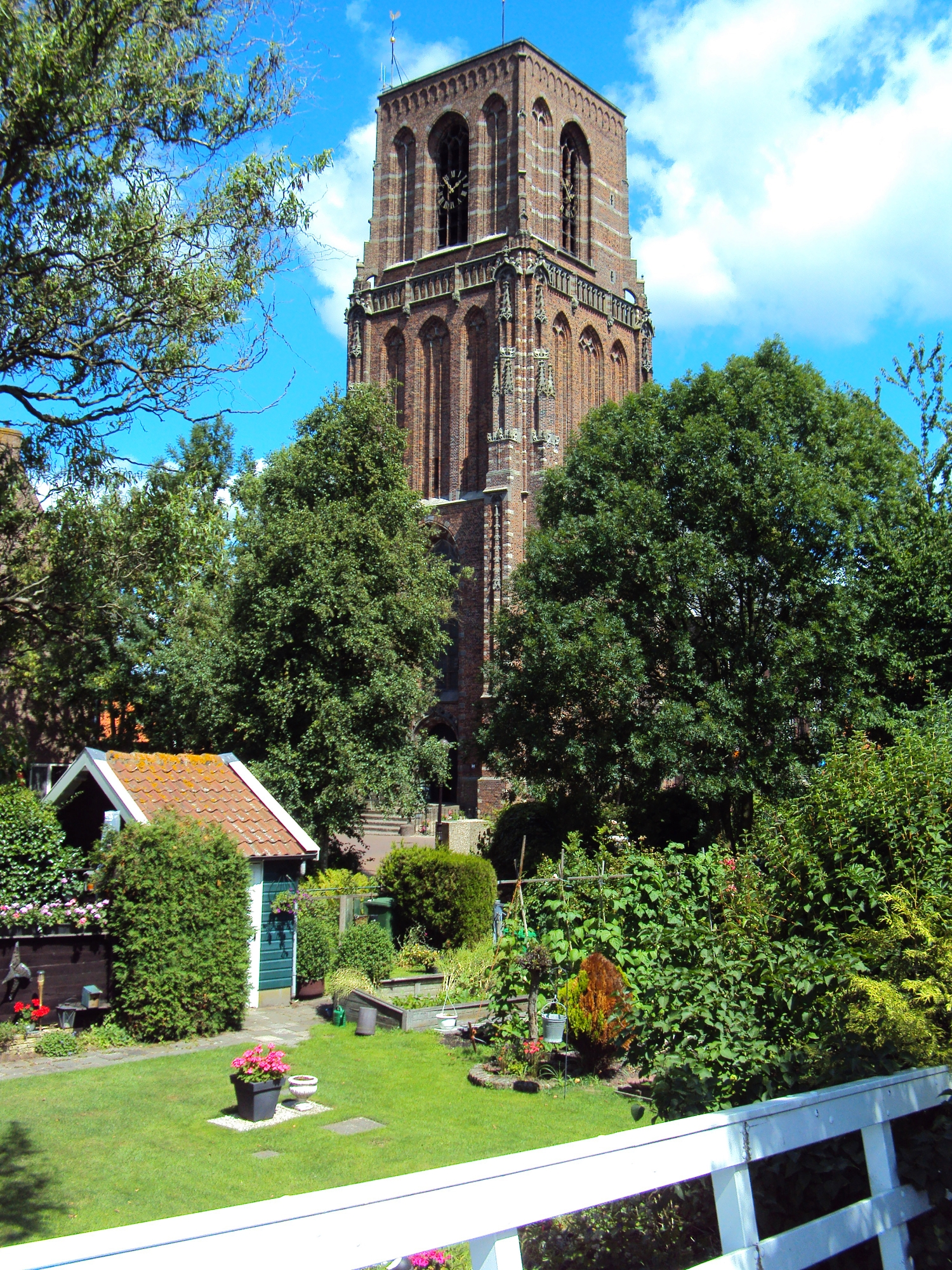
The church of Ransdorp, in the Landelijk Noord

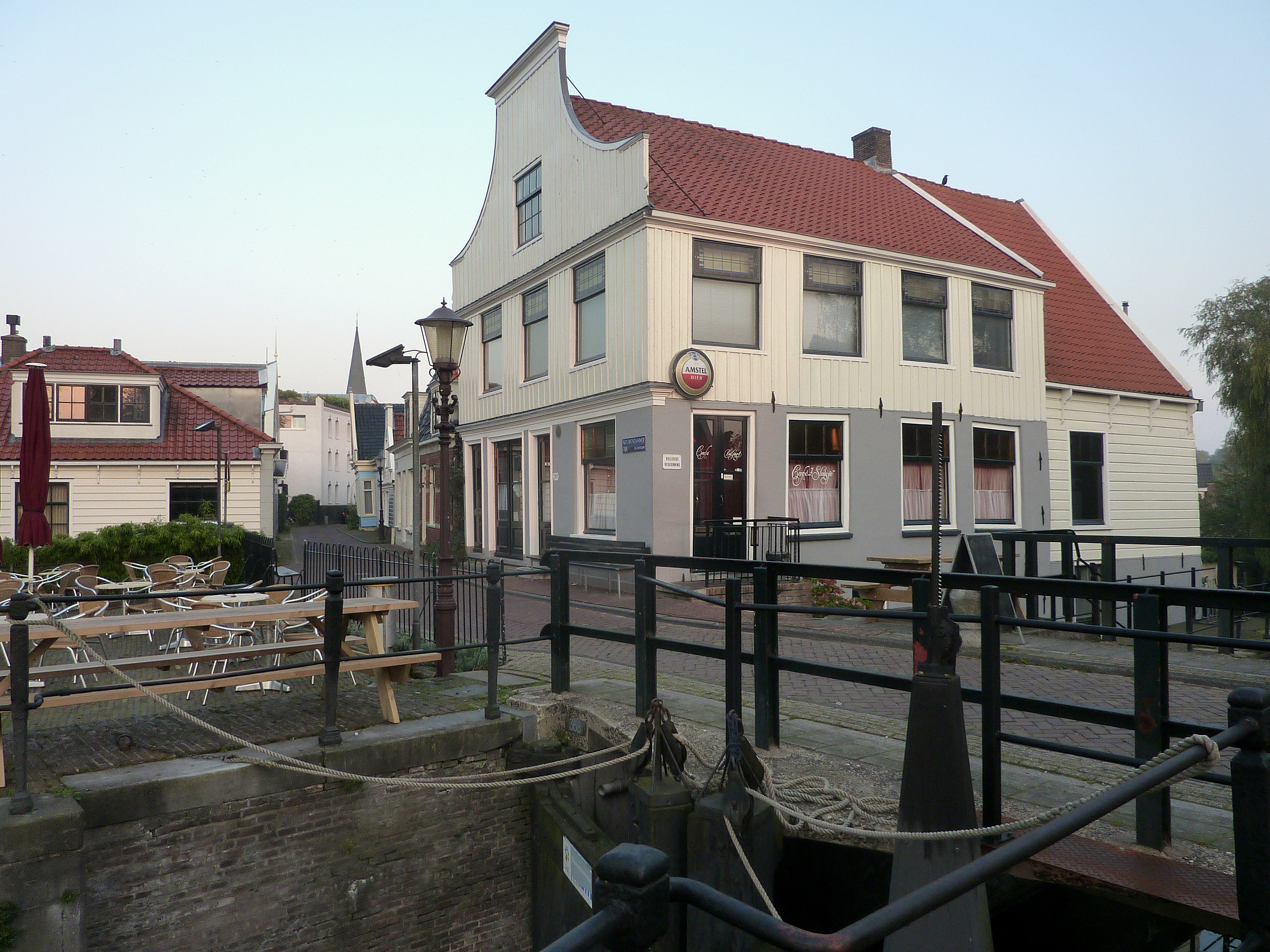
Nieuwendam, one of the borough's most central neighbourhoods

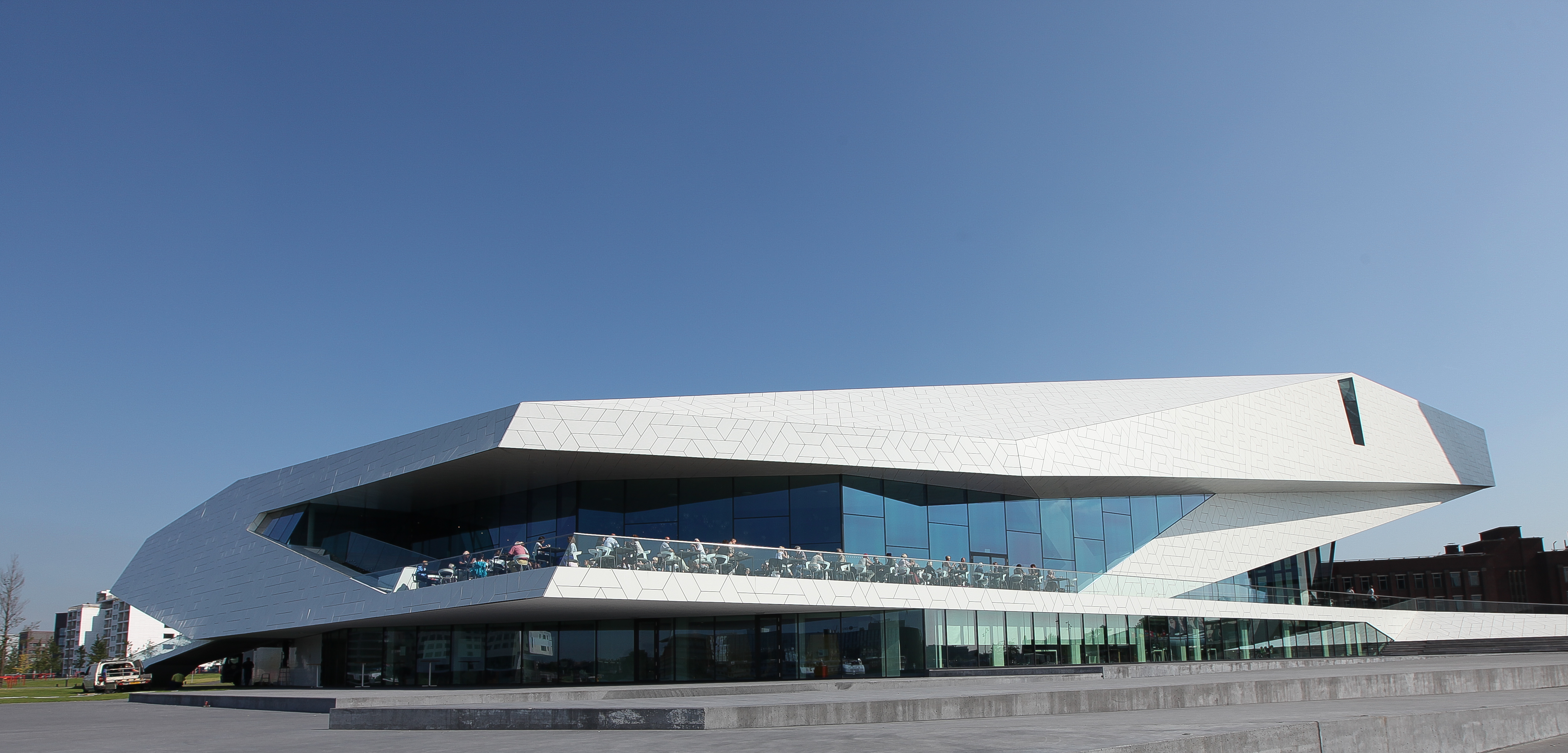
The EYE Film Institute Netherlands, in Overhoeks, on the shore of the IJ

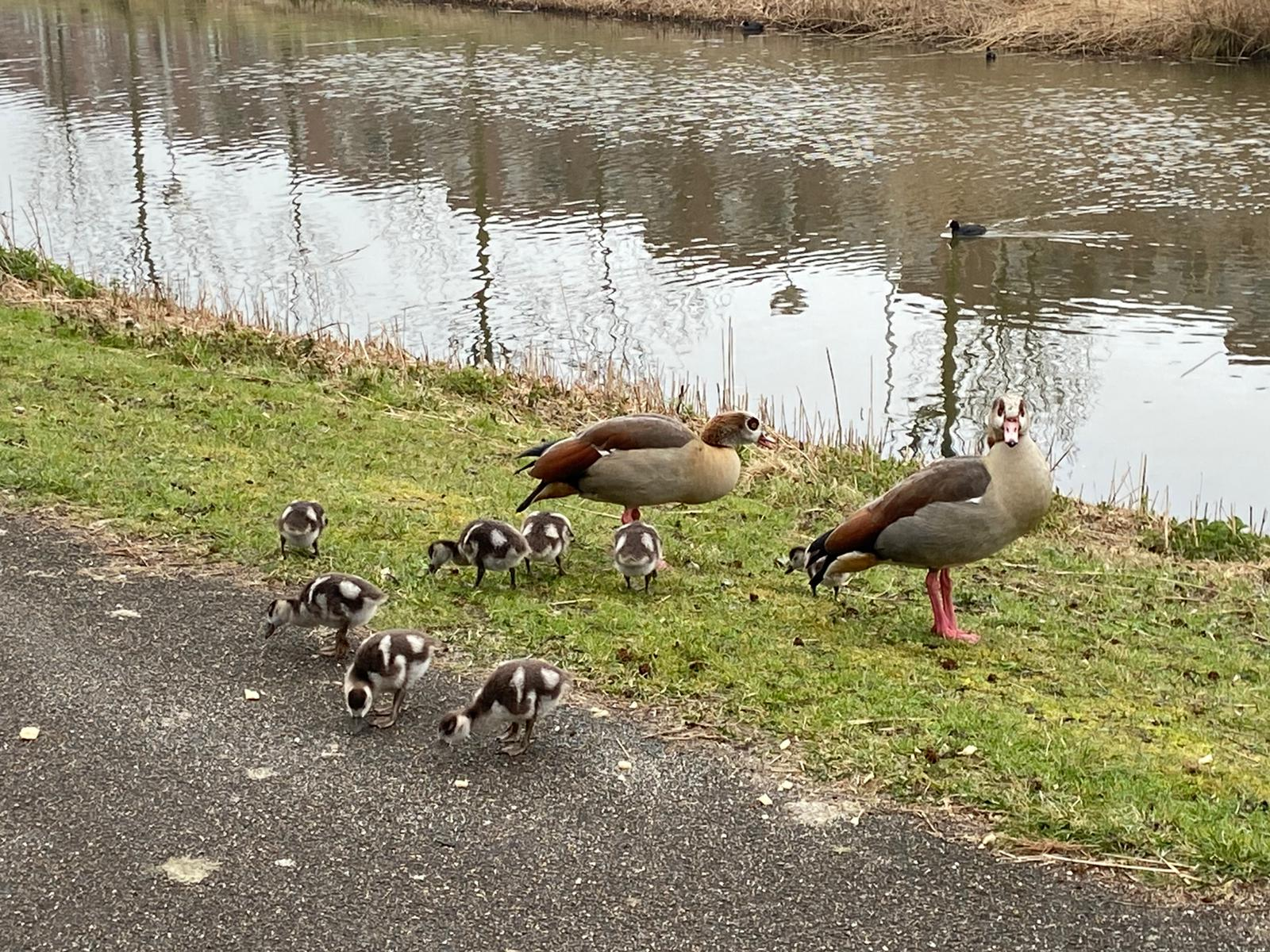
Egyptian Geese and their goslings taking a stroll at Elzenhagensingel, Amsterdam Noord

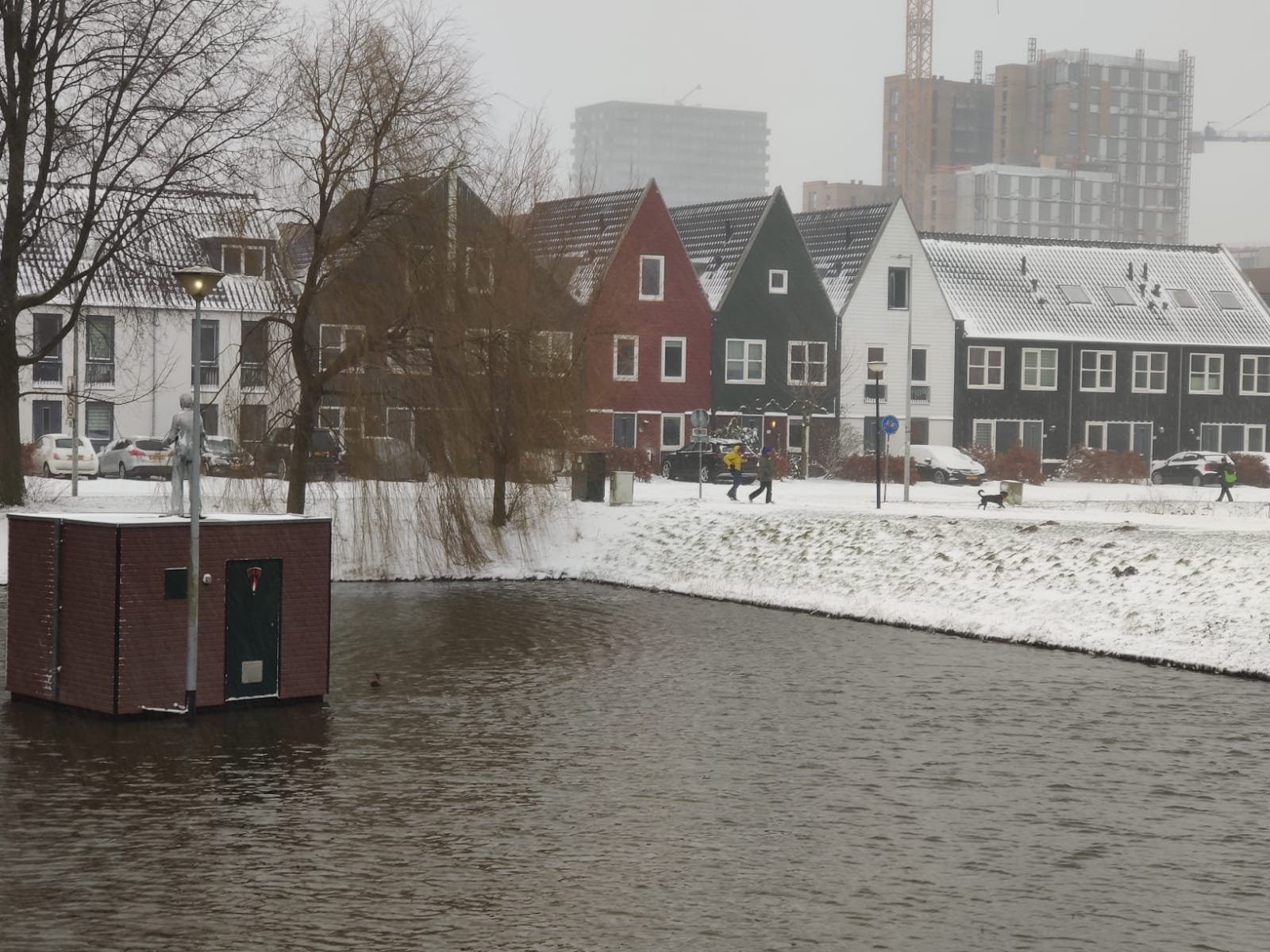
Snow graces Amsterdam Noord

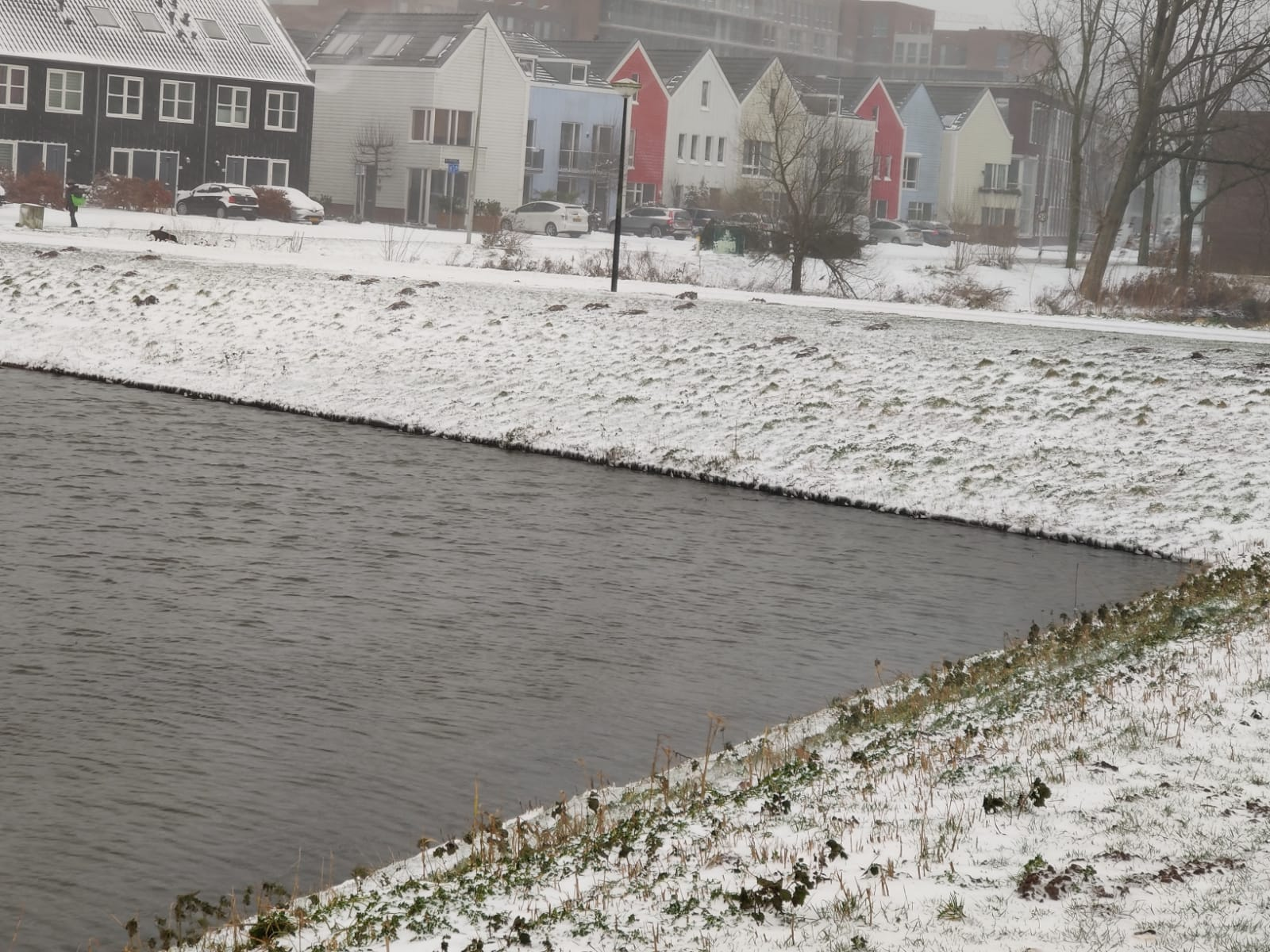
Snow in Amsterdam Noord

=== Notable locations ===
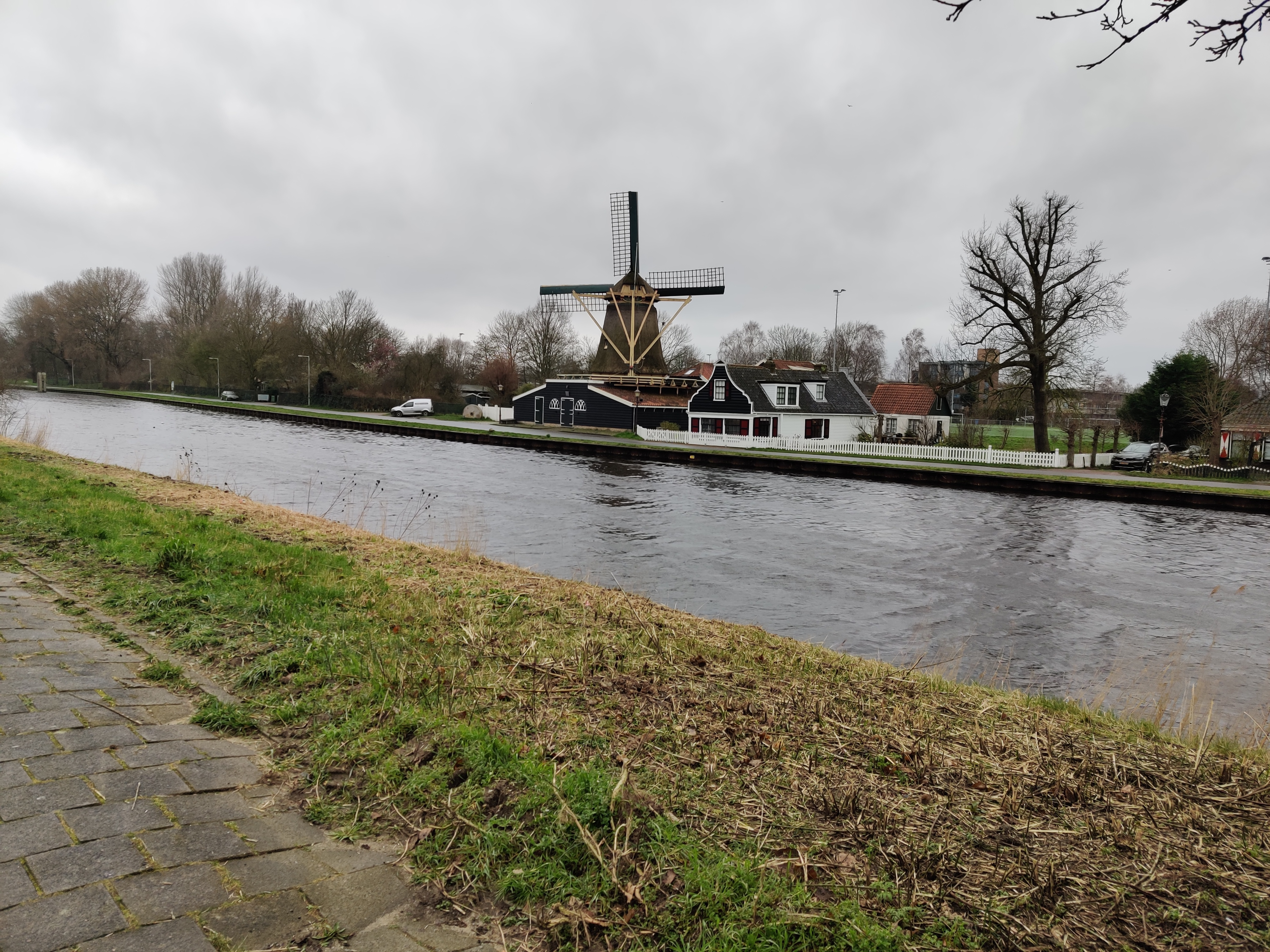
Krijtmolen d'Admiraal, Amsterdam Noord

In the borough, the old windmill Krijtmolen d'Admiraal towers over the calm Nord Hollandsche canal. The windmill was built in 1792, and is open to the public on select days for tours.

=== Parks ===
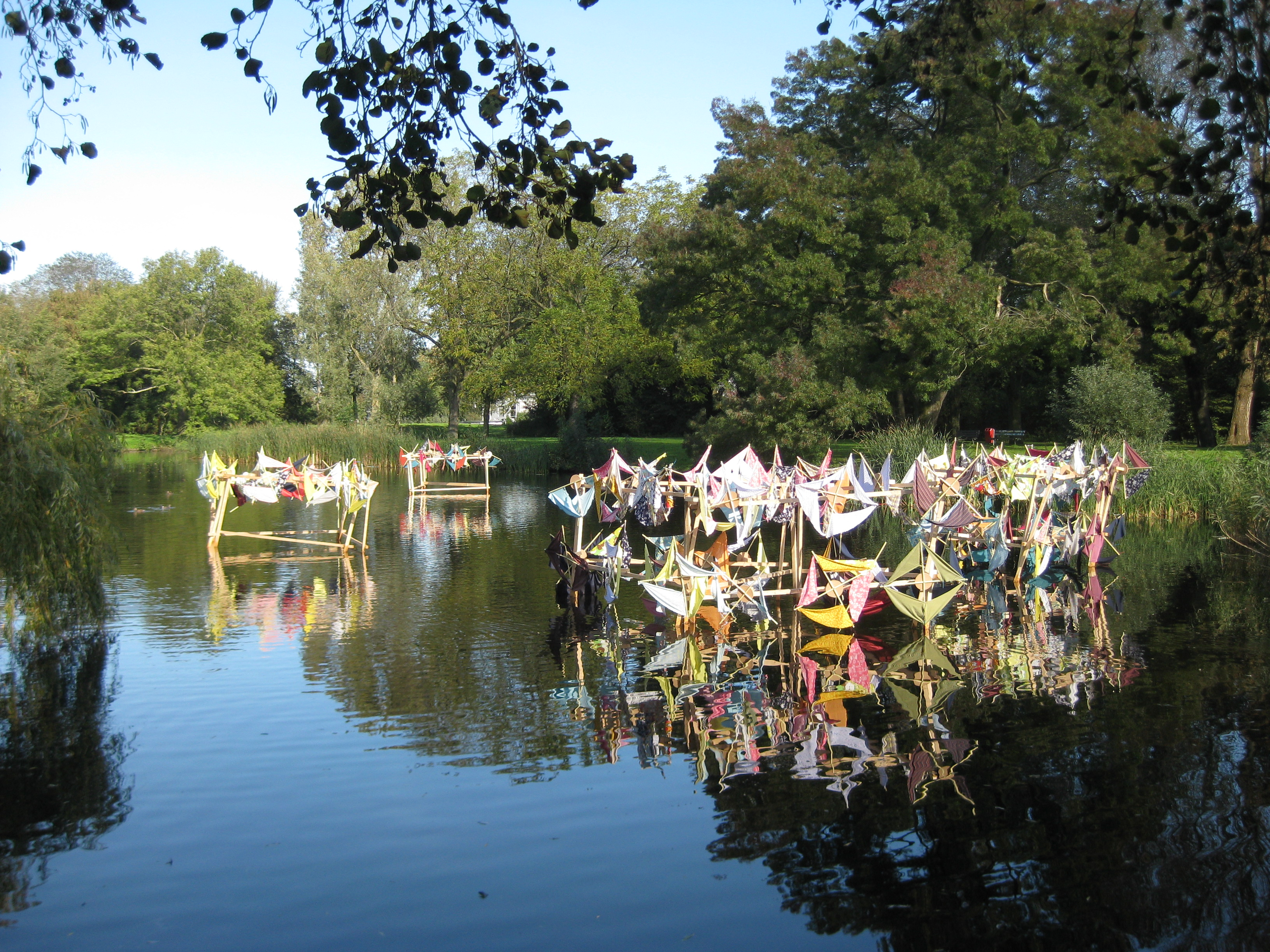
Noorderpark

The Vliegenbos (literal translation: fly forest), Amsterdam-Noord's main urban park, is known to locals as a place to relax and jog. Other parks in the borough include the Baanakkerspark, Schellingwouderpark, Florapark and Volewijkspark. The two latter parks (located on both sides of the Noordhollandsch Kanaal) merged in 2014 to become the Noorderpark.

=== Transport ===
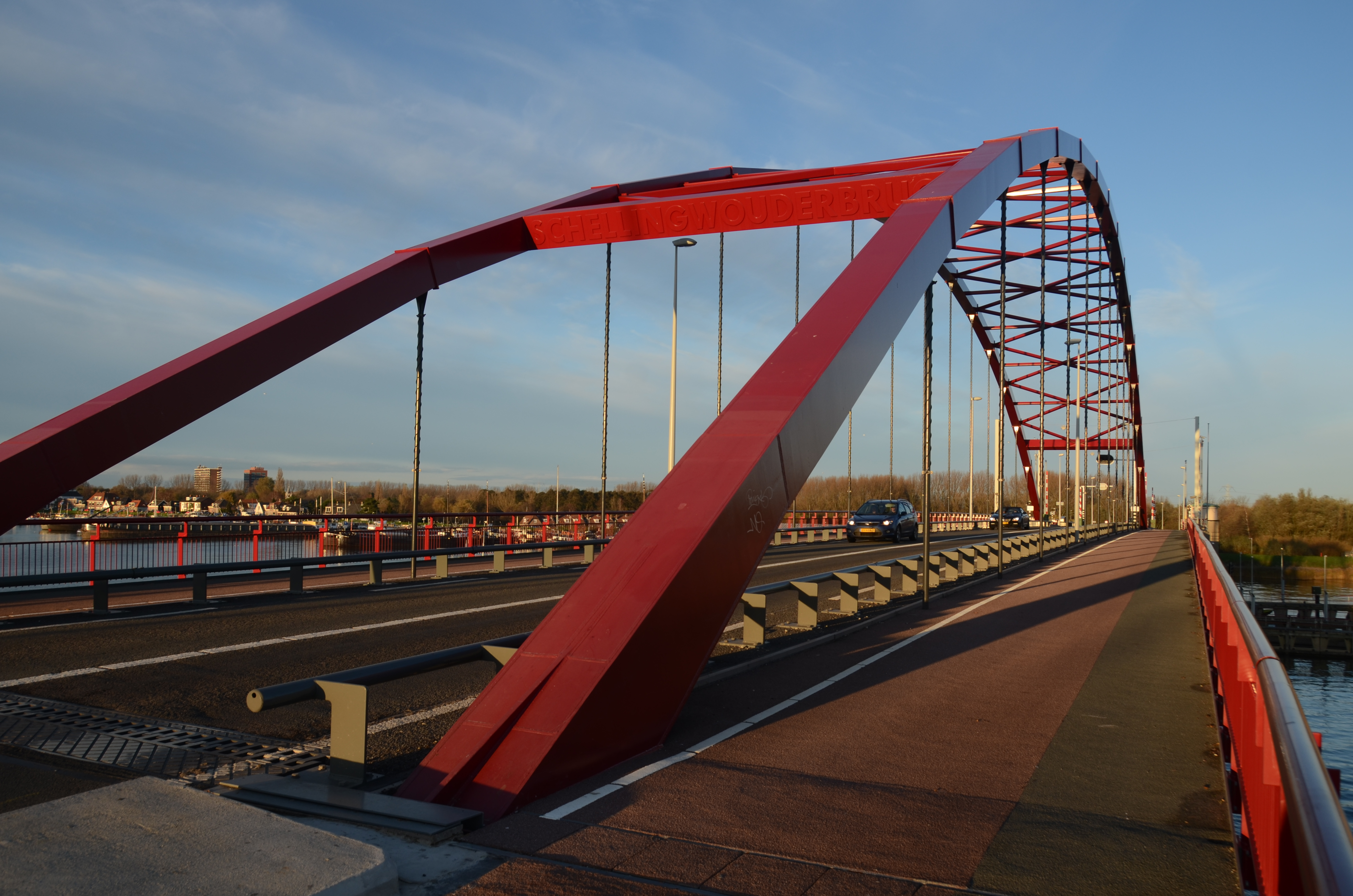
Schellingwouderbrug

Amsterdam-Noord is connected by one road bridge, the Schellingwouderbrug, and three road tunnels, the Coentunnel (west), IJtunnel (centre) and Zeeburgertunnel (east), to other parts of Amsterdam.

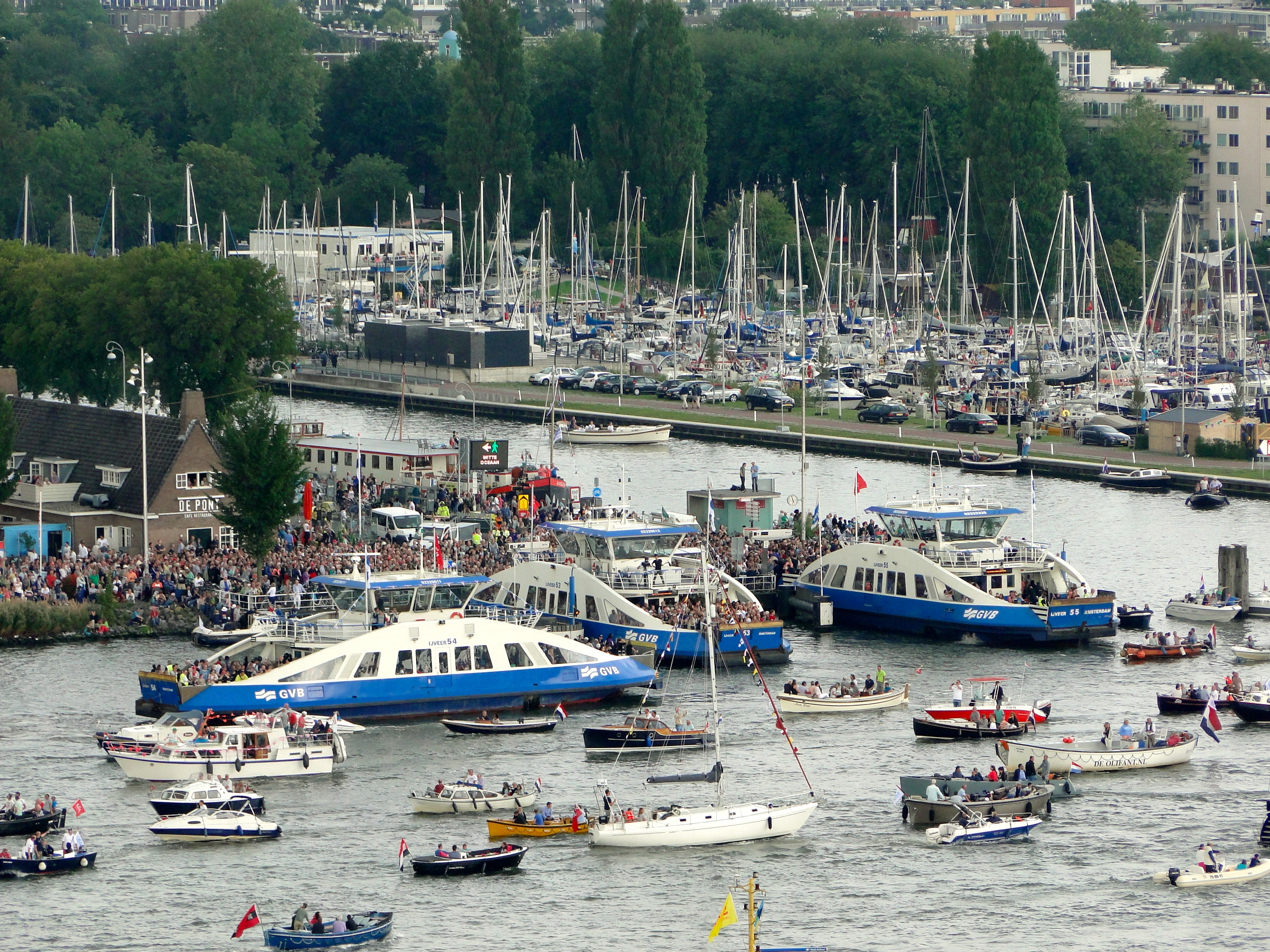
Three GVB ferries operating during SAIL Amsterdam 2015

Furthermore, there are seven ferry lines for pedestrians and (motor)cyclists to cross the IJ, which are operated by the Gemeentelijk Vervoerbedrijf (GVB). Some are operational 24 hours a day. They depart every two minutes for the Centraal station–Buiksloterweg connection (two or three boats at a time for this short distance) to every half hour for the Centraal station–NDSM-werf connection (one or two boats at a time for this long distance), with Centraal Station directly accessible due to its waterside location on the other side of the IJ.

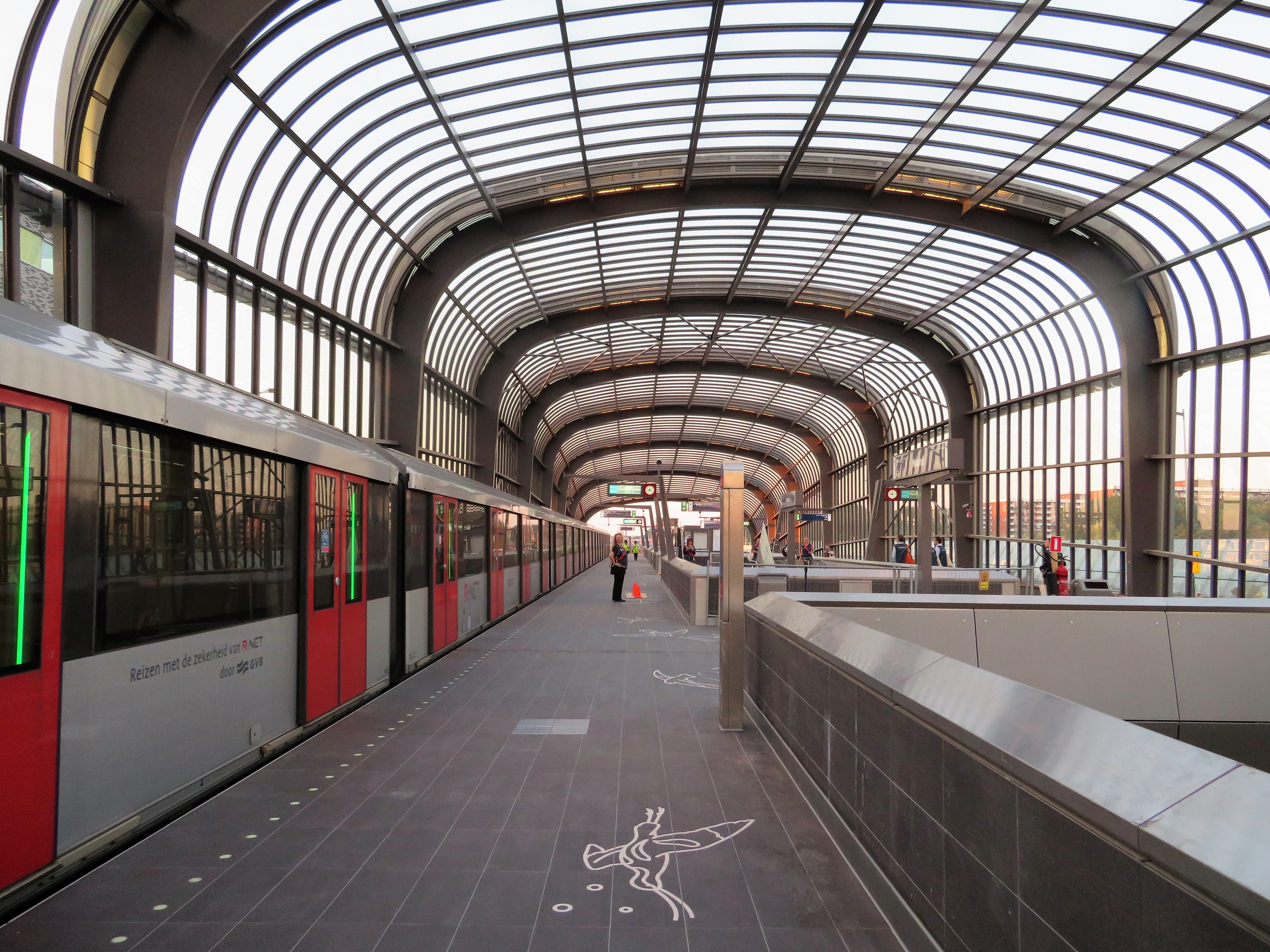
Noord metro station

There are several bus connections with the centre and other parts of Amsterdam and with Purmerend, Volendam and Zaandam. Because the area is physically separated from the rest of the Amsterdam conurbation, it is not served by trams. The area is however served by the Amsterdam Metro and its Route 52, which opened on 22 July 2018.

== Government ==
Like other boroughs in the city (with the notable exception of Westpoort), Amsterdam-Noord has an elected borough committee (Dutch: stadsdeelcommissie) that in turn elects an executive board (bestuurscommissie). Until 2014, the committee had 29 seats; it currently has 12.

During the Dutch municipal elections, 2018, the Labour Party (PvdA) and GroenLinks (GL) won three seats each, the Democrats 66 (D66) and Socialist Party two each and the People's Party for Freedom and Democracy (VVD) and Party for the Elderly (PvdO) one each, making Amsterdam-Noord's borough council one of the most left-wing in the city.

The voorzitter bestuurscommissie (literal translation: executive committee chair) presides over the borough executive committee. The following chairs have presided over Amsterdam-Noord since it became a borough with elected officials:

- Theo Fransman (PvdA), 1981–1990
- Ger de Visser (PvdA), 1990–1994
- Hans Oosterbaan (PvdA), 1994–2002
- Marijke van Schendelen (PvdA), 2002–2003
- Joke Peppels (Leefbaar Noord), 2003–2004
- Rob Post (PvdA), 2004–2014
- Coby van Berkum (PvdA), 2014–present
