= Molenwijk =

Coordinates: 52°24′00″N 4°55′48″E

- Neighborhood of Amsterdam
- Interactive map of Molenwijk
- Country: Netherlands
- Province: North Holland
- COROP: Amsterdam
- Time zone: UTC+1 (CET)

The Molenwijk (Dutch pronunciation: [ˈmoːlə(ɱ)ˌʋɛik]) district is a neighborhood in Amsterdam-Noord in the Dutch province of North Holland. It is part of the Oostzanerwerf district.

The Molenwijk borders the east side of the ribbons and on the South End, on the south side of Oostzanerdijk, a part of the Water Zeedijk, which forms the border with the adjacent Tuindorp Oostzaan, on the west side of the Kermis Area and on the north by the Whale neighborhood. The area is easily accessible by car, bicycle and bus. The neighborhood is located near the nature reserve Twiske.

The Oostzanerwerf the polder in which the district has been built was in the early 1960s as the depository for dredged from the North Sea. Although the area belonged to the municipality Oostzaan, Amsterdam had the Molenwiek Plan for this area developed a plan consisting of 1,256 residential properties spread over 15 buildings that could be done after the area on 1 August 1966 in Amsterdam by a boundary was added.

The plan, designed by architect K. Geer in collaboration with the Housing and Urban Development departments of the municipality of Amsterdam and the Amsterdam Federation of Housing Associations, composed of 100% high-rise. The selected parcel is based on ten-story residential buildings comprising a ground floor storage, which, viewed as the wings of a windmill around three to four storey car parks are situated. The name Molenwijk arose. The flats in the district bore the name of several common types of windmills in the Netherlands. The houses, for the most part four-room houses with the 1960s for Amsterdam standards unusually large average size of 95m^{2}, but also for a part three and two bedroom apartments were originally intended for the more affluent and young, large families. The first housed were completed on April 1, 1968.

Around the neighborhood is a causeway built (and the Stellingweg Molenaarsweg), where four roads to lead to this central car parks. The rest of the surface is designed as pedestrian and park-like domain, only crossed by bicycle and footpaths. Initially, it is assumed that one of the planned lines of the Amsterdam subway via a new route along the Landsmeerder Dijk and Oostzanerdijk to Molenwijk will be implemented. This, however, never happened because in 1968 adopted the plan after underground Nieuwmarkt riots in 1975 was withdrawn.

The apartment buildings were built of prefabricated elements of the contractor Zaanse Indeco-Coignet. At the edge of the area rose a sixteen-story skyscraper for the elderly, with an adjacent shopping mall, a garage and later demolished a library. Along the northern edge are two schools and a nursery built. The main square between the schools, after a major renovation in 2007 reopened. Furthermore, the district still has a botanical garden and a petting zoo.

The district, like the Plan Van Gool in Garden City Buikslotermeer, often considered a precursor of the Bijlmer, where the separation of the various traffic types in the original design even further was made, but in this case is not quite correct because the plans were developed almost simultaneously.
