= Buiksloot =

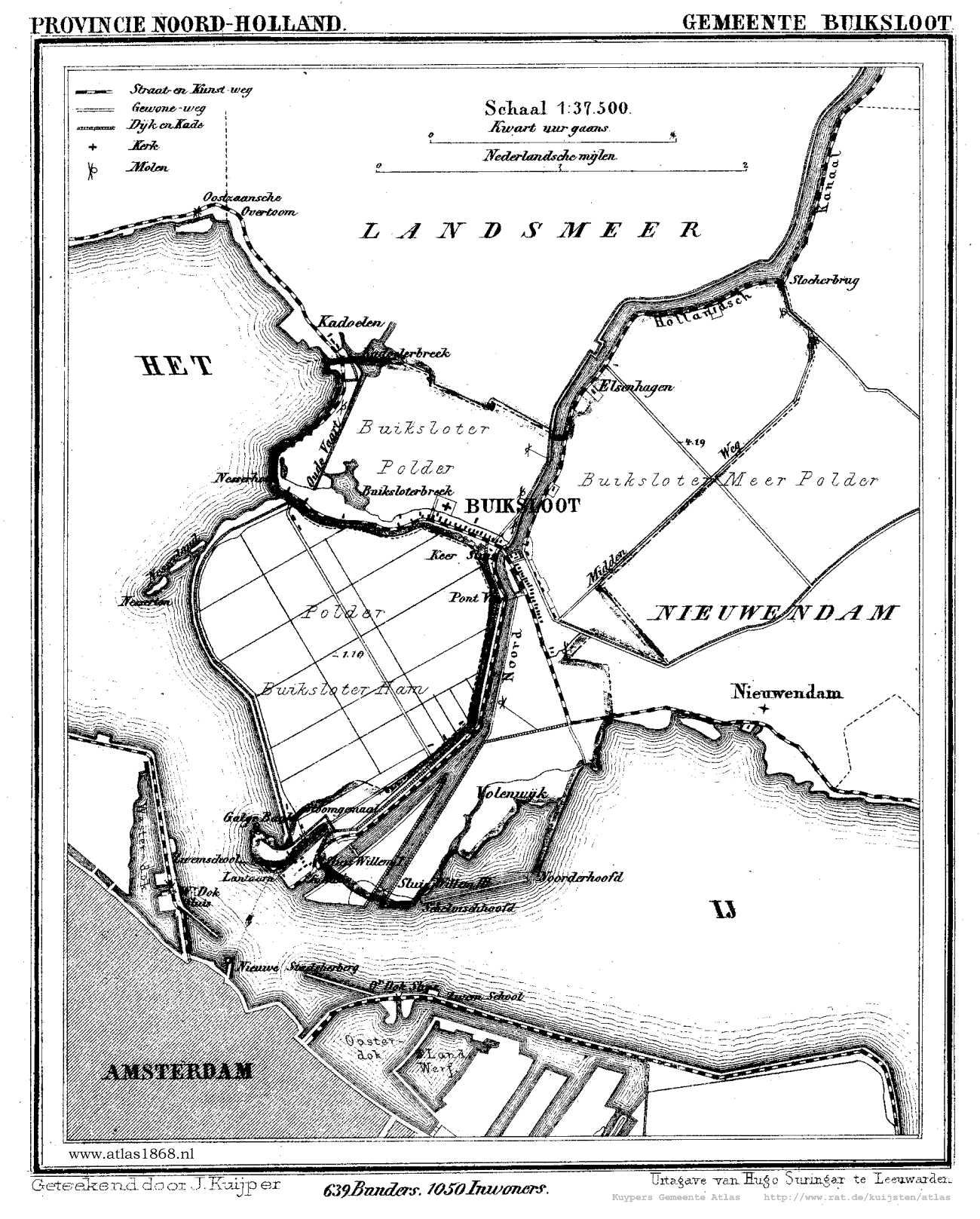
- Map of Buiksloot
- Interactive map of Buiksloot
- Coordinates: 52°23′59″N 4°54′59″E
- Country: Netherlands
- Province: North Holland
- Municipality: Amsterdam

Buiksloot is a former village in the Dutch province of North Holland. It is now a neighbourhood of Amsterdam-Noord. Buiksloot was a separate municipality from 1811 until 1921, when it was merged with Amsterdam.

From 1888 to 1956, Buiksloot had a tram connection with Amsterdam-Noord and Waterland. The Waterland tram had a stop in Buiksloot, near today's Nieuwe Leeuwarderweg. Since 2018, Buiksloot has been cut in half by the Noord/Zuidlijn metro.

== Location ==
The old village center lies along the Buiksloterdijk (a dyke), more specifically at the Northern IJdijk, between Nieuwendam and Oostzaan. The Buiksloot church, built in 1609, is located behind the dyke. To the west of the village, behind the dyke is the Buiksloterbreek, formed after a dyke breach. A part of the present Nieuwendammerdijk (part of Nieuwendam) belonged to Buiksloot. A part of this has been called Leeuwarderweg since 1935. The Buiksloterdijk is intersected by the Nieuwe Leeuwarderweg (a road), which opened in 1968.

== History ==
=== Waterland ===
Buiksloot is a (former) polder. The village was formed along the Waterland Sea Dyke, erected from the 13th onwards. Buiksloot was first named in 1275, later becoming a linear village. Due to a dyke breach in 1514 south of the (not yet reclaimed) Buikslotermeer, a large amount of the original buildings were washed away and contact between the settlements of Buiksloot and Schellingwoude was broken off. Here, the settlement of Zunderdorp founded the new linear village Nieuwendam.

In 1532, Charles V founded the Hoogheemraadschap (High Water Authority) Waterland for water management north of Buiksloot, from Monnickendam to Purmerend. This merged into the Hoogheemraadschap Noordhollands Noorderkwartier in 1919. From then on, the settlement Buiksloot fell under the jurisdiction of the bailiwick Waterland. From the 17th century onwards, the population of Buiksloot exceeded that of the Schellingwoude settlement, of which it was part until the French era. Between the 17th and 19th century, Buiksloot had between 500 and 800 inhabitants.

=== Polders of Buiksloot ===
North of Buiksloterdijk was the Buiksloot polder and north of it the Zuiderpolder (South polder), which extended into the neighbouring municipality of Landsmeer, until the municipal boundary was changed in 1966. To the northeast was the partly Buiksloot-owned Buikslotermeer, a polder from 1627. Created in 1851 south of Buiksloot, the Buiksloterham polder initially belonged to Buiksloot, but since 1877 it belongs to the municipality of Amsterdam. Buiksloot has been bisected by the Noordhollands Kanaal since 1824, with a movable bridge at Buiksloterdijk level.

=== Settlement ===
The settlement of Buiksloot was traditionally one of the six settlements into which the Waterland bailiwick was divided. This designated a particular area where a bailiff could exercise his authority and administer justice. This term survived the Batavian Revolution, but it only kept its meaning in the polder. It was not until 1936 that the Waterland settlements were disbanded.

=== Accessibility of Amsterdam ===
From as early as the 14th century there was a ferry line to Amsterdam, Buiksloterveer. Since 1556, this line is owned by Amsterdam. In 1659, five cities (Amsterdam, Hoorn, Edam, Monnickendam and Purmerend) agreed to build a network of tow-canals (Zesstedenweg) with a regular trekschuit service. In Buiksloot there was a crossroad from the IJ to the tow-canal northwards, which uses the western ring canal from the reclaimed Buikslotermeer in 1627. This reclaimed land became part of the Noordhollandsch Kanaal in 1824.

=== Eighty Years' War ===
Throughout the 16th century, Buiksloot experienced multiple floods, including the All Saints' Flood of 1570. Because of these floods, certain parts of the village were lost in the waves. At the start of the Eighty Years' War/Dutch Revolt (1568-1648) hagepreken (sermons) were held in Buiksloot, among other places. As early as 1572, Waterland assumed a pro-prince stance, while Amsterdam remained loyal to the Spanish king until 1578. Several battles between the Geuzen (Beggars) and Alva's army take place around the vicinity. Trade begins to flourish after 1585, and Buiksloot benefited greatly from this. The village belonged to the settlement of Schellingwoude until 1811, after which it became a separate municipality.

=== Merger with Amsterdam ===
As Buiksloot was already strongly connected with Amsterdam (see Accessibility of Amsterdam), they requested to join the city to benefit from the superior facilities in 1913. It took eight years to officialise the merger between Buiksloot and Amsterdam. The municipality was severely impoverished after the flood of 1916, when a large area north of Amsterdam flooded. On the first of January 1921, Buiksloot merged into the municipality of Amsterdam along with Nieuwendam, Ransdorp, Sloten and Watergraafsmeer.

After the merger, the village underwent some major expansions north of the Buiksloterdijk and west of the Noordhollandsch Kanaal with garden village Buiksloterham. This garden village was one of the new garden villages in Amsterdam-Noord. East of the canal, you'll find garden village Buiksloot.

=== New housing estates ===
In the 1960s-70s, a new district called Banne Buiksloot was built north of the village. It consists of two parts, Banne-Noord (northern part) and Banne-Zuid (southern part). During the 90s, Banne-Oost (eastern part) was added.

In Buikslotermeer, from the 1960s onwards, many new houses and a mall were built. Old village buildings of Buiksloot on the dyke of the Buikslotermeer, alongside the ring canal, were demolished for this purpose. Also in the western part of the village, between the Buiksloot church and the Buiksloterbreek, many old dyke structures disappeared. Part of the Buiksloot dyke was also excavated for the construction of the Nieuwe Purmerweg (a road), which never saw the light of day. Eventually, only the middle part of the village along the Buiksloterdijk was spared. Buiksloot, along with the garden villages dating from the 1920s, has been part of the Rijksbeschermd gezicht Amsterdam-Noord (state protected) since 2014.

Near Buiksloot, close to the Noordhollandsch Kanaal, lies the chalk mill D'Admiraal (The Admiral). This mill is the last of its kind.

== Notable people from Buiksloot ==
- M.H. Laddé, photographer and director of the first Dutch film
- Erasmus Smit, missionary in South-Africa
