= Kadoelen =

Coordinates: 52°25′03″N 4°54′24″E

- Neighbourhood of Amsterdam
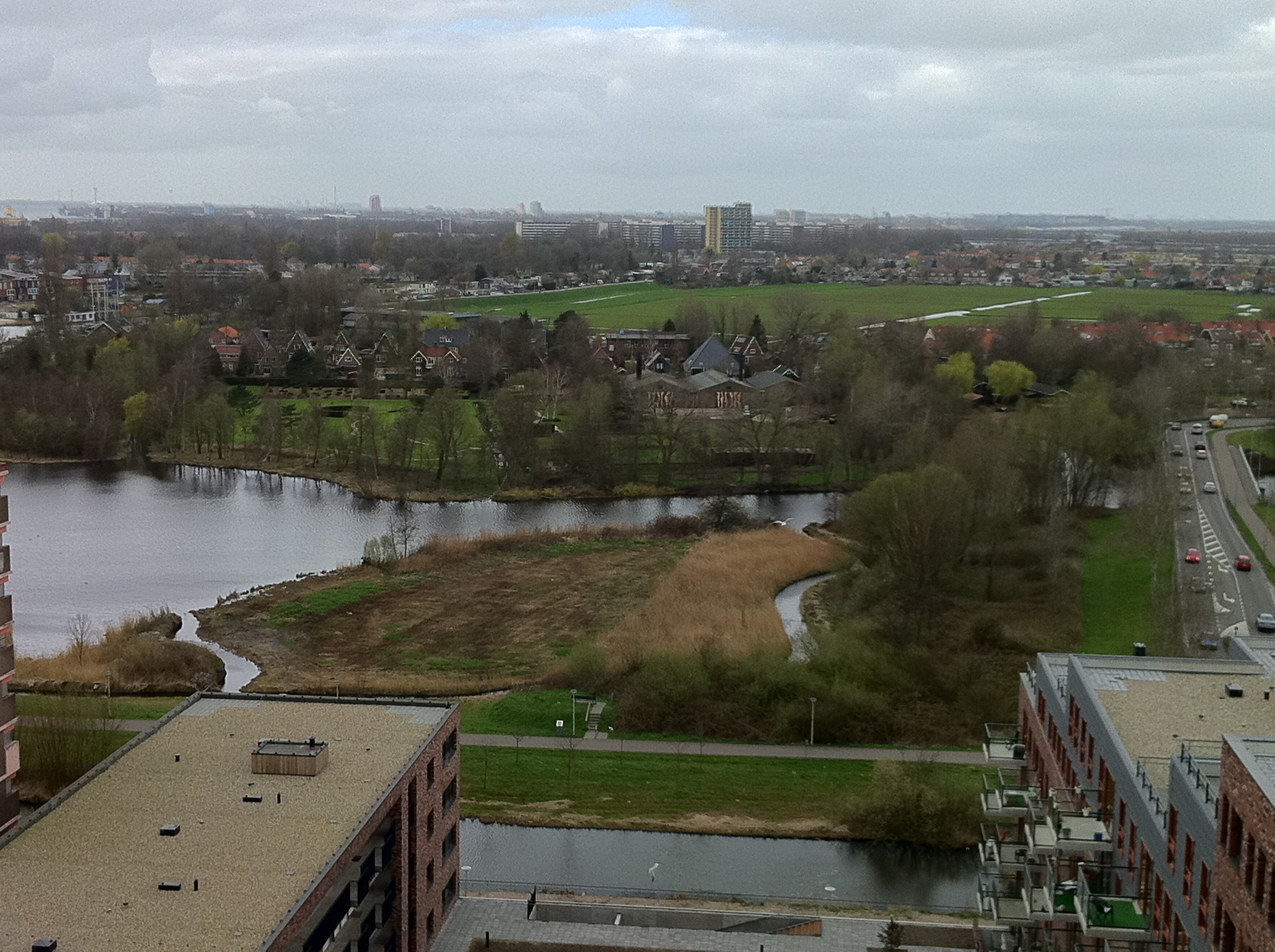
- Aerial view of Kadoelen

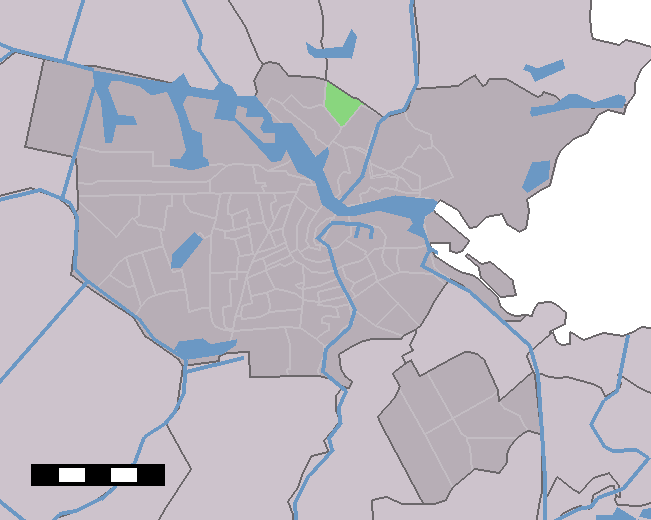
- Location of Kadoelen (green) in Amsterdam
- Country: Netherlands
- Province: North Holland
- Municipality: Amsterdam
- Borough: Noord
- Time zone: UTC+1 (CET)

Kadoelen is a neighborhood of Amsterdam, Netherlands located in the Noord borough.
