= Buikslotermeer =

Coordinates: 52°24′N 4°57′E

- Polder in Amsterdam
- Interactive map of Buikslotermeer
- Country: Netherlands
- Province: North Holland
- COROP: Amsterdam
- Time zone: UTC+1 (CET)

Buikslotermeer is a neighborhood and a polder of Amsterdam, Netherlands. The Buikslotermeer is a reclaimed lake, now largely located within the city of Amsterdam-Noord. Nowadays, the name 'Buikslotermeer' is used to refer to the entire Buikslotermeerpolder (approximately 12.000 inhabitants) of the similarly named neighborhood, located in the south-east of the polder.

== History ==
The lake must have been 340 hectares in size and 3 to 4 meters deep, before it was drained in 1627, together with two other Waterland lakes; the Belmer and Broeker lake. The lakes were probably formed due to the erosion of worn-down peatland (the 'water wolf'). The soil of the polder - no marine clay - turned out to be only suitable as pasture.

The western part of the ring ditch became part of the Noordhollandsch Kanaal (Great North Holland Canal) in 1824. A year after, in 1825, the dyke at Durgerdam collapsed and the Waterland and the Buikslotermeer were completely flooded. The last time the polder flooded was in 1916.

The Buikslotermeerpolder was located in the former municipalities of Nieuwendam and Buiksloot. Both merged into the municipality of Amsterdam in 1921, as part of Amsterdam Noord. Hereafter, the polder retained its agricultural nature. Amsterdam's General Expansion Plan ("Algemeen Uitbreidingsplan") from 1934 did not provide housing in Amsterdam Noord. However, in the 1930s the Noorderbegraafplaats (a cemetery) was built in the northwestern part.

A change in the Algemeen Uitbreidingsplan in 1958 meant that the polder was built up at a rapid pace in the 1960s. Early 20th century buildings along the southern ring dike (Buikslotermeerdijk) disappeared without a trace, as did the older large farmsteads 'Boerelust', 'Herteveld' and 'Elsenhage' (located at the current sports park 'Elzenhagen').

== Buikslotermeer in present day ==
The polder still drains into the drainage system via the Noordhollands Kanaal. The water level in the canal is -1.54 m NAP (Dutch: Normaal Amsterdams Peil/ English: Amsterdam Ordnance Datum). In the polder this varies to -4.8 to -5.2 m below NAP. The ground level varies from -3.5 to -4.5 m NAP. Typical is the elevated construction of all roads crossing the polder.

Notably, the raised slopes of the A10 ring road and Nieuwe Leeuwarderweg divide the polder into four sections. A water treatment plant is located in the northwestern section, the northeastern section has a golf course. Within the ring road, west of the Nieuwe Leeuwardenweg, are the De Nieuwe Noorder cemetery (formerly the Noorderbegraafplaats) and the residential areas of Jeugdland (construction between 1995-1998) and Elzenhagen-Noord (construction since 2006) and sports park Elzenhagen.

The largest part of the polder is located in the southeast. Here is the Buikslotermeer district, along with the Buikslotermeerplein and the Olof Palmeplein; where the Boven 't Y shopping center and the district office are located. To the west and south of the Buikslotermeerplein are the districts of Loenermark (often called as 'banana flats') and the Plan van Gool. East of the Buikslotermeerplein is the Waterlandpleinbuurt, formerly named Nieuwendam-Noord. The Research and Statistics department of the municipality of Amsterdam uses the combination 'Buikslotermeer' for its reports, which covers the entire polder.

A big portion of the polder is part of the Centrum Amsterdam Noord planning area, which provided new housing, schools, a library, and a theatre, expansion of the shopping mall and the construction of subway station North at the North-South line at the traffic median of the Nieuwe Leeuwarderweg.
