= Oostzanerwerf =

Coordinates: 52°25′16.18″N 4°53′18.4″E

- Neighborhood
- Interactive map of Oostzanerwerf
- Country: Netherlands
- Province: North Holland
- COROP: Amsterdam
- Time zone: UTC+1 (CET)

Oostzanerwerf is a neighborhood of Amsterdam, Netherlands.
