= Nieuwendammerdijk en Buiksloterdijk =

Coordinates: 52°23′46.65″N 4°55′24.31″E

- Neighborhood of Amsterdam
- Interactive map of Nieuwendammerdijk en Buiksloterdijk
- Country: Netherlands
- Province: North Holland
- COROP: Amsterdam
- Time zone: UTC+1 (CET)

Nieuwendammerdijk en Buiksloterdijk is a neighborhood of Amsterdam, Netherlands.
