= Tuindorp Nieuwendam =

Coordinates: 52°23′28″N 4°56′39″E

- Neighborhood of Amsterdam
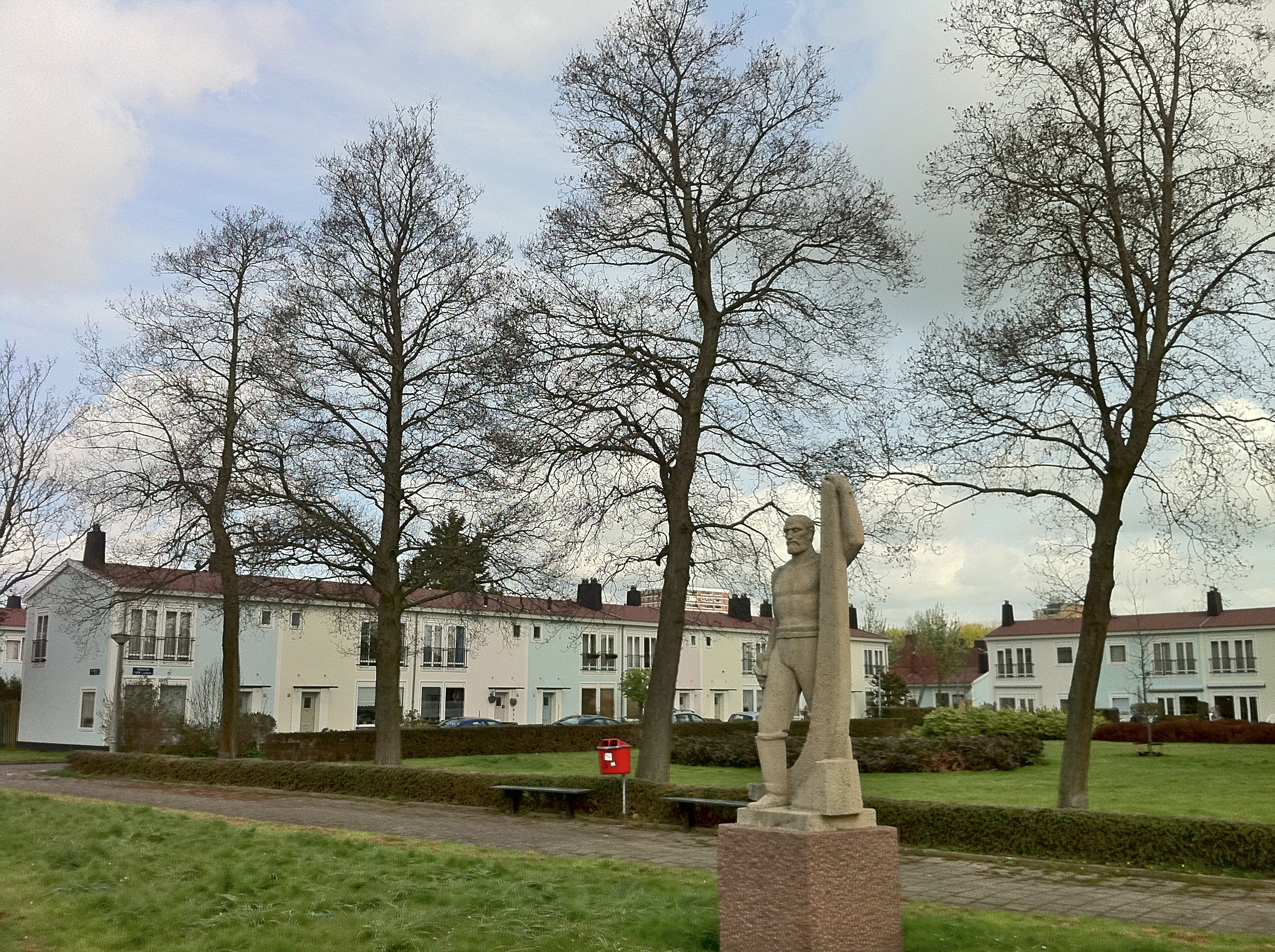
- Interactive map of Tuindorp Nieuwendam
- Country: Netherlands
- Province: North Holland
- COROP: Amsterdam
- Time zone: UTC+1 (CET)

Tuindorp Nieuwendam is a neighborhood of Amsterdam, Netherlands. The neighborhood is a 'garden village' and was developed in the 1920s.
