= Tuindorp Oostzaan =

- Neighbourhood of Amsterdam
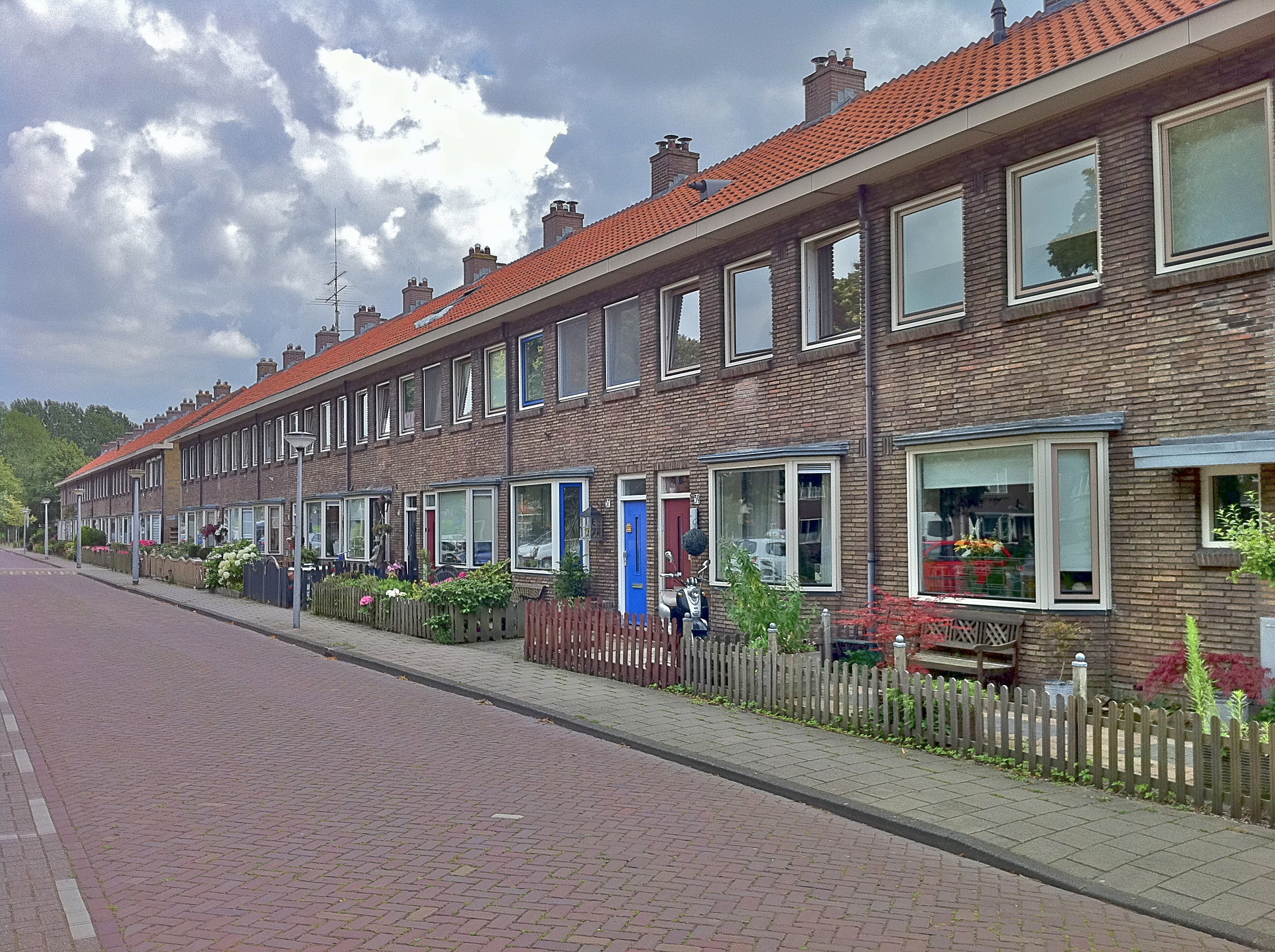

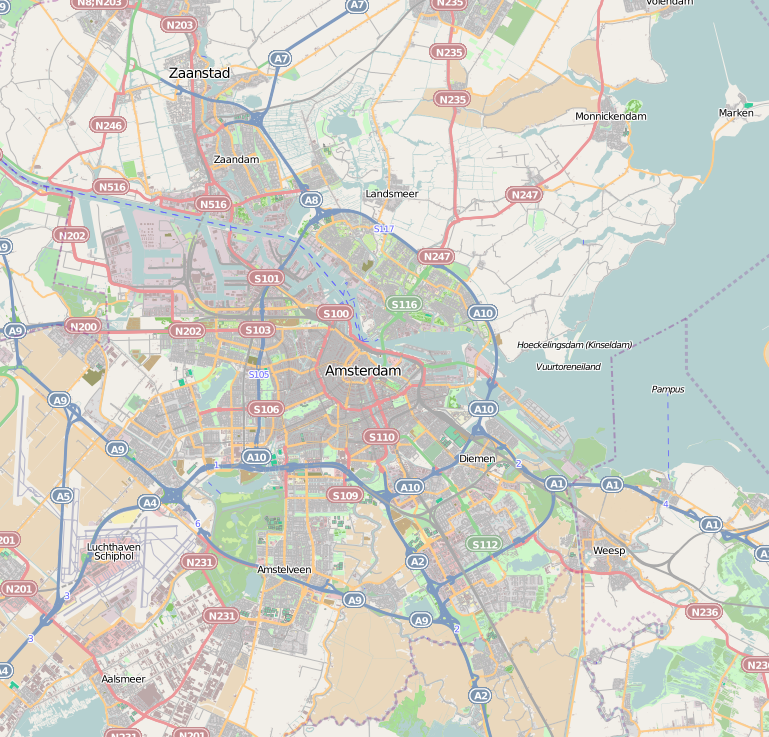
- Location within Greater Amsterdam Location within Netherlands
- Coordinates: 52°25′N 4°54′E
- Country: Netherlands
- Province: North Holland
- COROP: Amsterdam

Population (2021)
  - Total: 17,330
- Time zone: UTC+1 (CET)
- Postal code: 1033

Tuindorp Oostzaan is a neighbourhood of Amsterdam, Netherlands. The neighbourhood is named after the adjacent village of Oostzaan. As of 6 August 2021, the neighbourhood had a population of 17,330.

== History ==
Inspired by the garden city movement, Tuindorp Oostzaan was one of multiple working-class 'garden villages' built by the Amsterdam Municipal Housing Service between the First and Second World Wars. The neighbourhood was designed to provide the growing number of workers employed by the new industry and shipbuilding on the North Bank of the IJ with quality housing close to their place of work. Construction of the neighbourhood was meant to achieve the dual aims of counterbalancing the impoverished neighbourhoods of the city and removing the need for an expensive connection between the city centre and Amsterdam-North.

The first 1,324 homes were built between 1919 and 1924. The southwestern part followed between 1934 and 1939, with 642 homes. After the Second World War, Tuindorp Oostzaan-Oost was built between 1945 and 1955, adding an additional 368 homes.

In 1921, experiments in building with concrete were conducted on a few rows of houses on Castorstraat and Castorplein. The trial was successful and a few years later the same techniques were used on a large scale in Betondorp.

Between 1994 to 1995, many buildings in Tuindorp Oostzaan were thoroughly renovated to extend their lifespans.

In 2014, the oldest parts of Tuindorp Oostzaan were designated a protected urban landscape.

=== Flooding ===
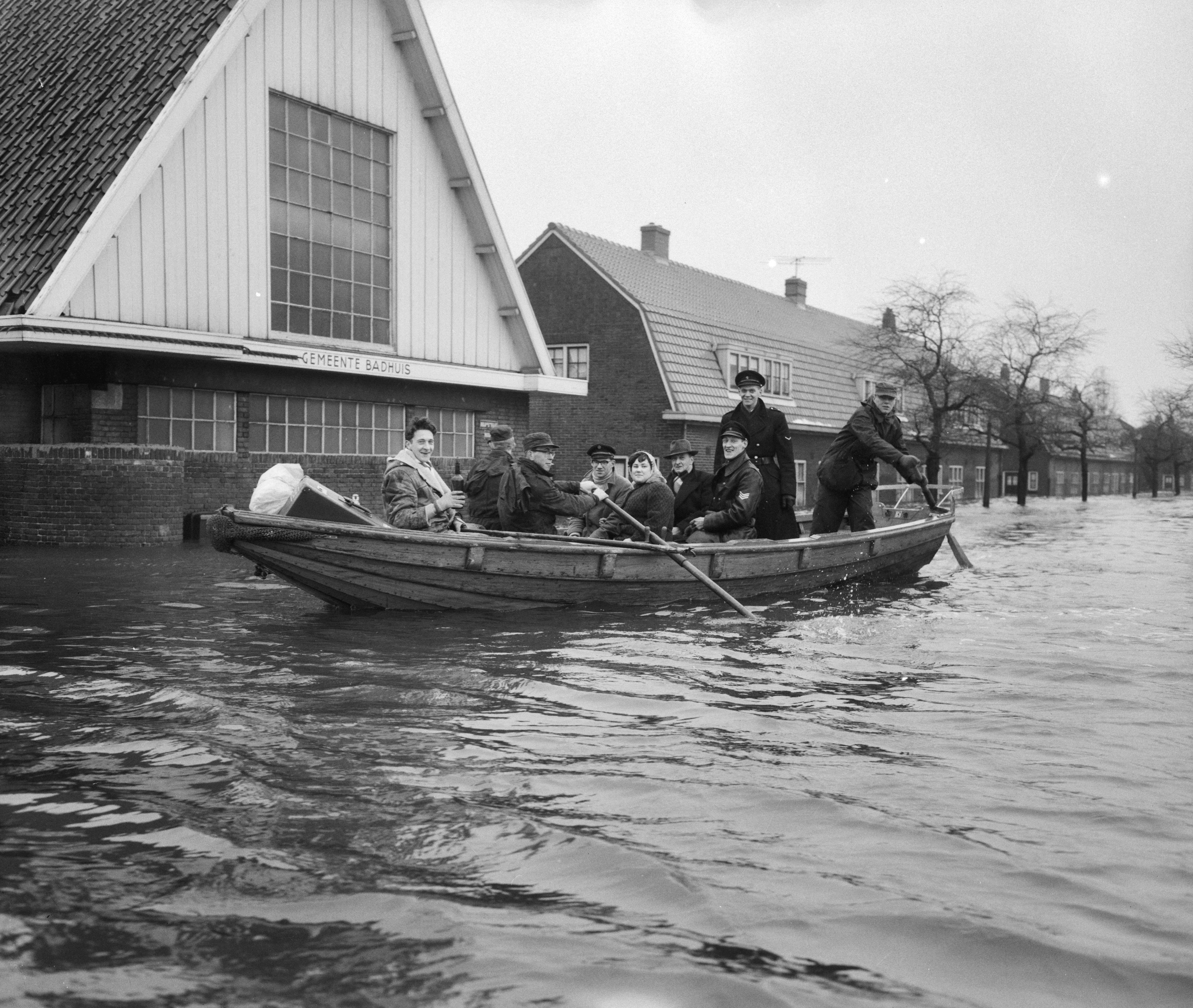
Rescue by boat in 1960

Tuindorp Oostzaan is situated outside the Oostzanerdijk in a low-lying polder. This became evident on the morning of 14 January, 1960, when a forty-meter gap in the dike of Zijkanaal H flooded Tuindorp Oostzaan and nearby neighbourhoods. Within a few hours, the waters rose up to two meters high. Over 2,600 homes were flooded and more than ten thousand residents had to be evacuated.

The total damage amounted to approximately eight million guilders and it would take until 1971 for the financial settlement to be completed. Despite this, residents felt they received sufficient compensation from the government, leading to a joke that the people of Tuindorp Oostzaan prayed: "Give us this day our daily bread, and a flood every year."

Residents of Tuindorp Oostzaan were allowed to return to their houses after a week. The cause of the breech was never officially determined, but most assumed that a burst water pipe below the surface of the dike was responsible, perhaps due to the recent construction of a mooring for houseboats. After the flood, piles were driven into the water and reed beds were removed in order to prevent more flooding.

== Present-day ==
In 2021, the district had 17,330 inhabitants. Relatively speaking, there are more elderly people and families with children compared to the rest of Amsterdam-Noord. Single family homes are in the majority. The older, low-lying part of Tuindorp Oostzaan was mostly built in the twenties. The upper part was built in different periods of time and contains more modern houses, lofts, apartments and villas.
