= Nieuwendam =

- Neighbourhood of Amsterdam
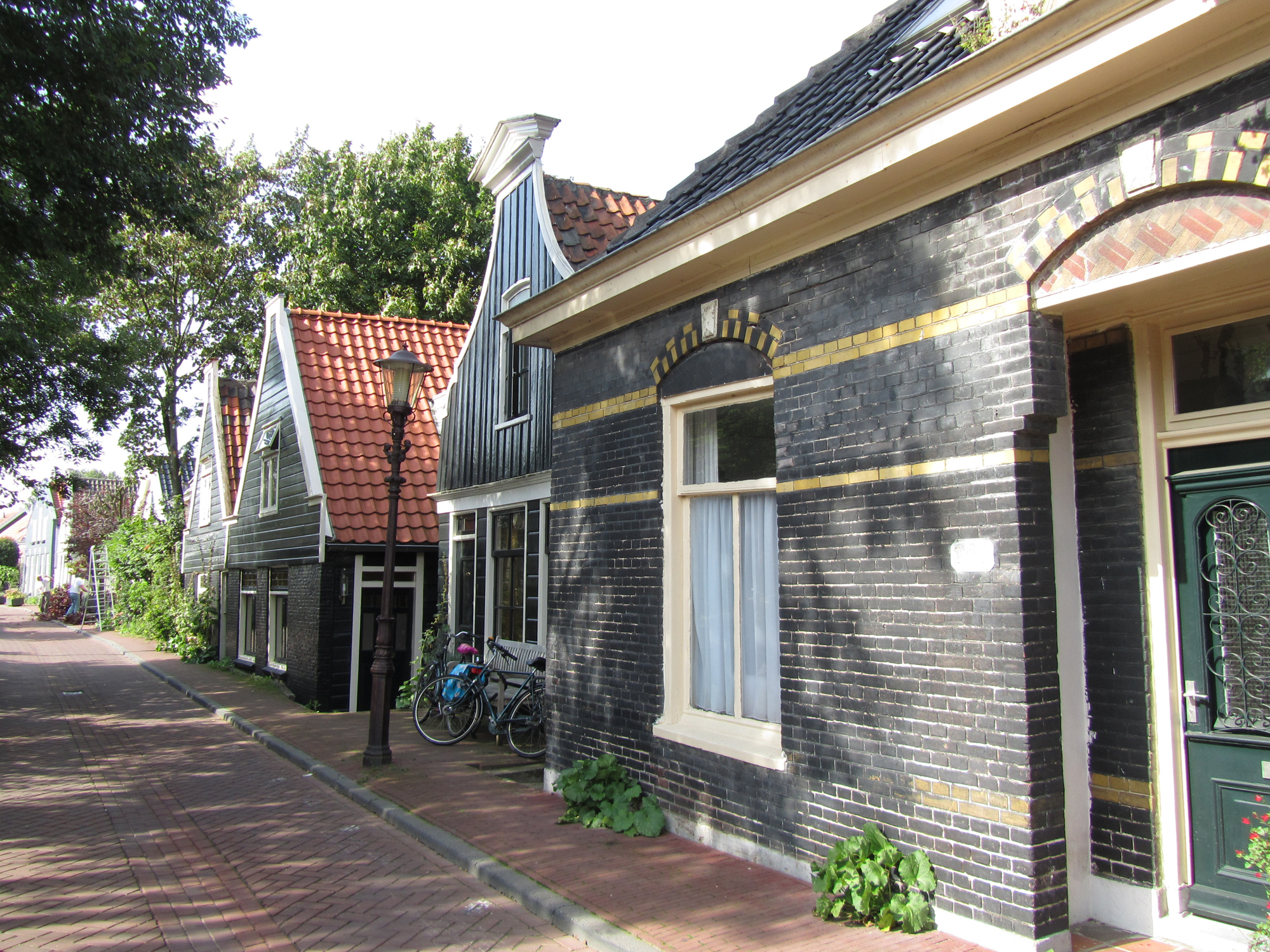
- Nieuwendammerdijk

- Coat of arms
- Interactive map of Nieuwendam
- Coordinates: 52°23′30″N 4°56′26″E
- Country: Netherlands
- Province: North Holland
- Municipality: Amsterdam
- Borough: Noord

Nieuwendam (literal translation: "new dam") is a neighbourhood of Amsterdam, Netherlands, best known for its marina (Dutch: jachthaven). A former village in the province of North Holland, Nieuwendam was a separate municipality until 1921, when it merged with Amsterdam, at the same time as Ransdorp. The municipality also covered the village of Zunderdorp. Nowadays, it is part of the Amsterdam-Noord borough.

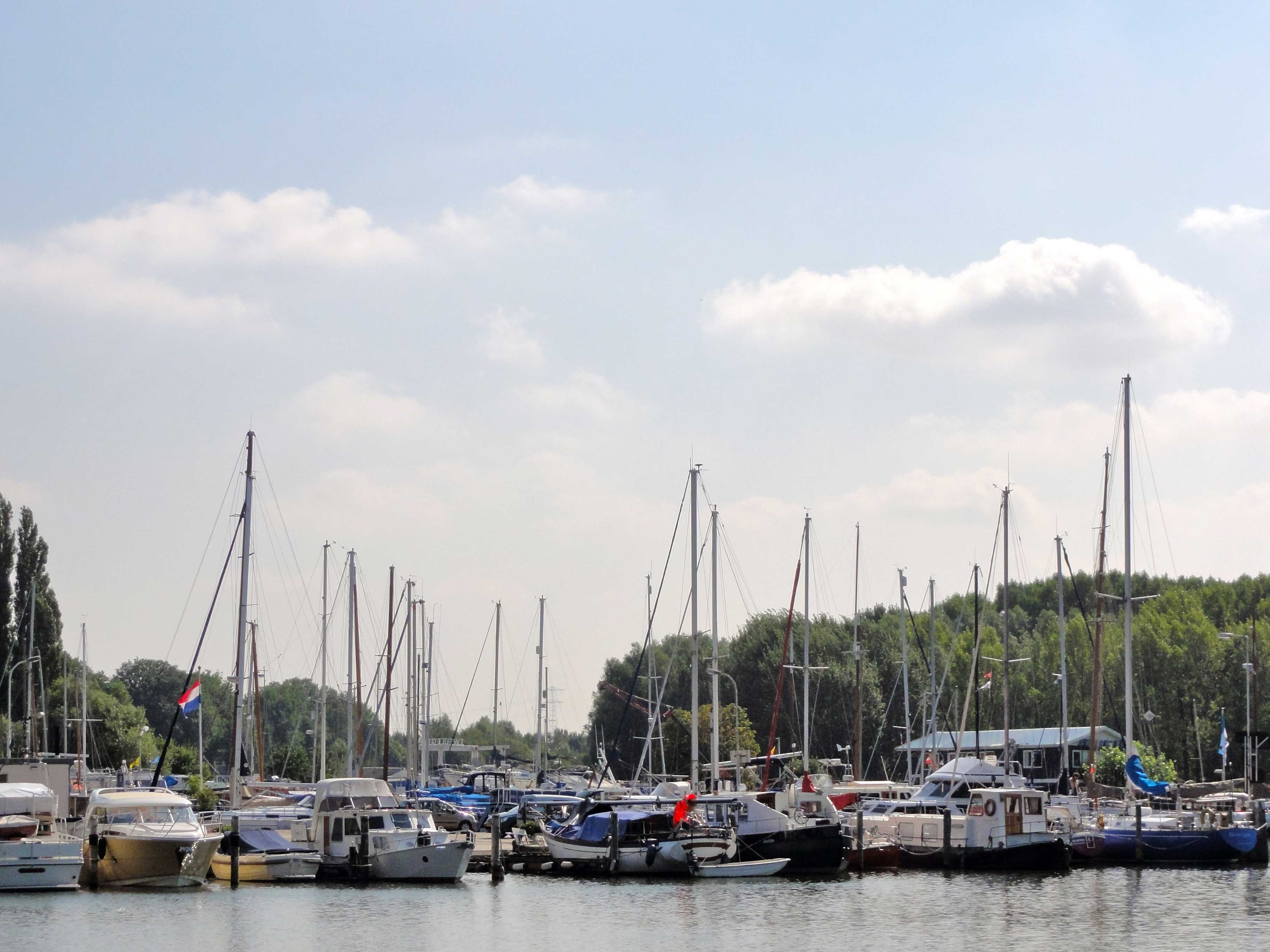
Marina of Nieuwendam

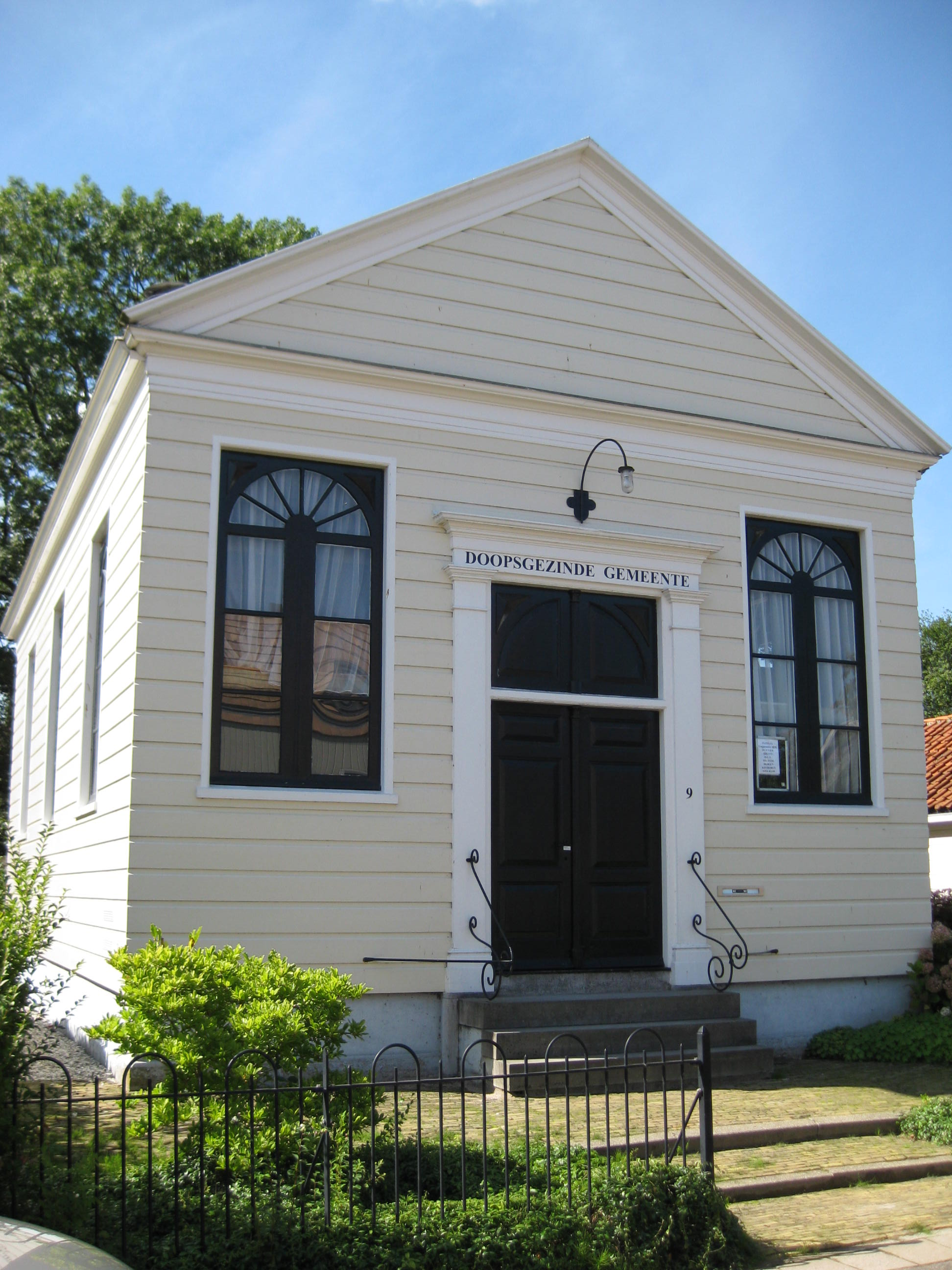
The Meerpadkerkje, a small mennonite church (Rijksmonument)

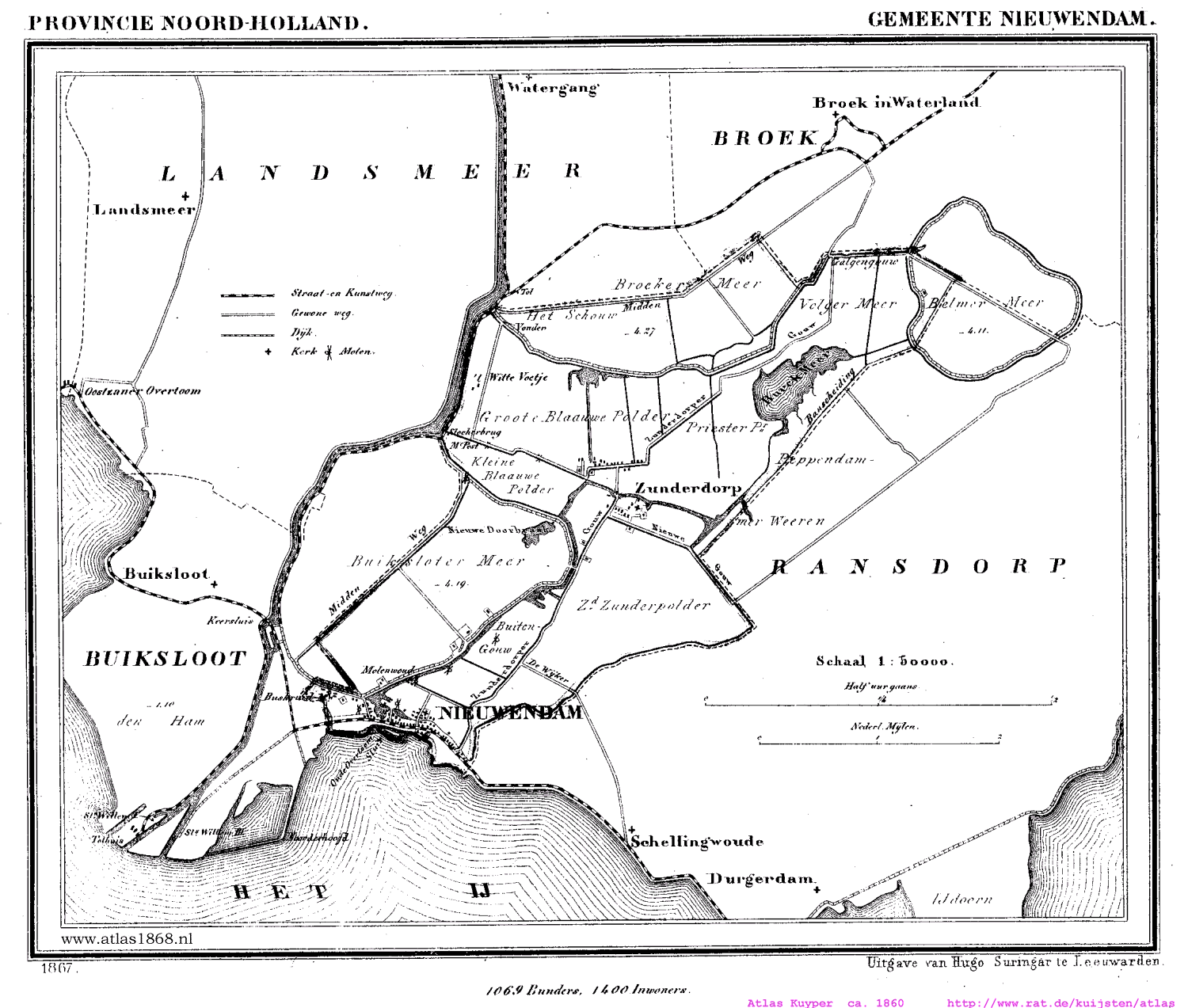
1867 map of the municipality of Nieuwendam

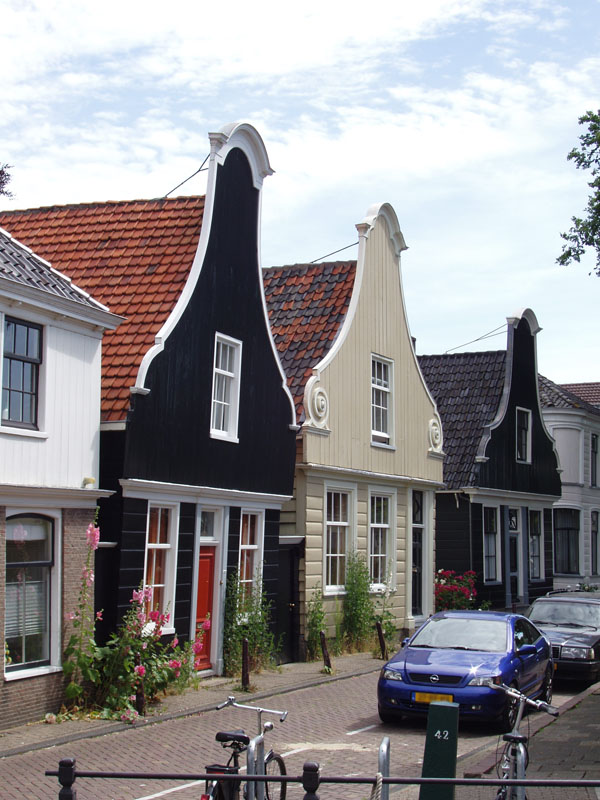
Former seamen's houses near the marina
