= Burgwallen Oude Zijde =

Coordinates: 52°22′28″N 4°53′53″E

- Neighborhood of Amsterdam
- Interactive map of Burgwallen Oude Zijde
- Country: Netherlands
- Province: North Holland
- COROP: Amsterdam
- Time zone: UTC+1 (CET)

Burgwallen Oude Zijde is a neighborhood of Amsterdam, Netherlands located east of the original course of the Amstel River.

This area is bounded by Damrak, Dam, Rokin, Amstel, Kloveniersburgwal, Nieuwmarkt, Geldersekade, and Prins Hendrikkade. Burgenwallen Oude Zijide later developed on the western bank of the river. Part of this neighborhood is known as De Wallen. Within De Wallen, the Blaauwlakenblok forms a small neighborhood with its own distinct character.

The main streets are Warmoesstraat and the Nes, which was originally the eastern dike along the Amstrel River. There is also the Zeedijk, the original dike along the IJ. The main canals are the Oudezjids Voorburgwal and Oudezijds Achterburgwal. Drainage into the IJ took place via the Oudezijds Kolk.

This part of the city was built in the Middle Ages between the 13th and 15th centuries. The most important building is the Oude Kerk, whose construction began around 1300. Until the Alteration of 1578, the area was characterized by many monasteries.
