= Grimburgwal =

Canal in Amsterdam

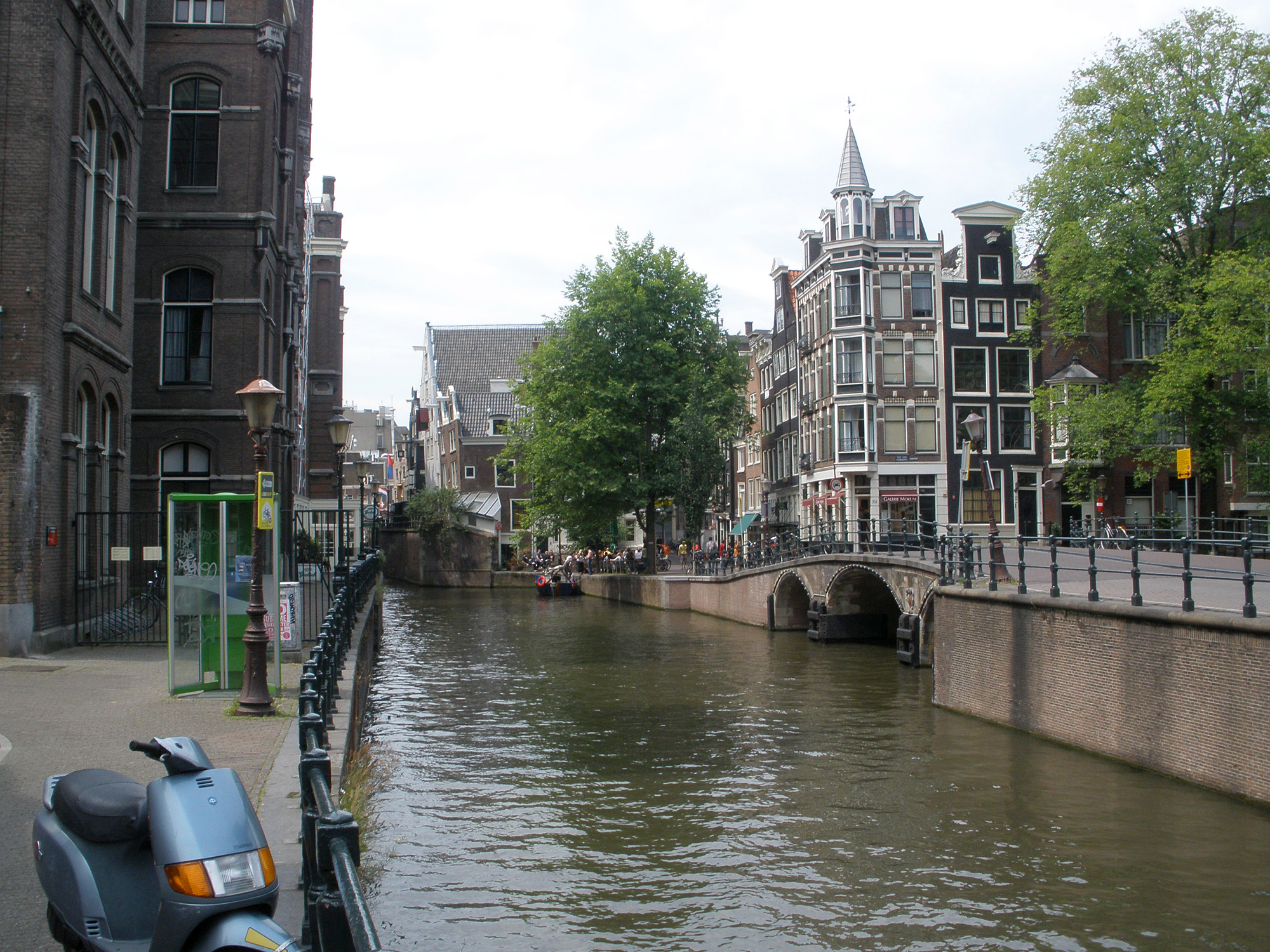
- The Grimburgwal
- Location: Amsterdam
- Postal code: 1012
- Coordinates: 52.369167°N 4.893611°E
- West end: Rokin
- To: Oudezijds Achterburgwal

The Grimburgwal is a small canal and street in the center of Amsterdam.

== Location ==
The canal was the southern border of the city until 1425 and is now the southern border of De Wallen, the red light district. The Nes street and the Oudezijds Voorburgwal and Oudezijds Achterburgwal canals end at the Grimburgwal. The Grimburgwal, continuing east from the Langebrugsteeg, runs from the Nes, past the Oudezijds Voorburgwal to the Oudezijds Achterburgwal. From here, pedestrians can walk to the Kloveniersburgwal via the Oudemanhuispoort .

A large part of the University of Amsterdam is located in the Binnengasthuis and Oudemanhuispoort complex on the Grimburgwal. There are also a number of cafés, restaurants, galleries and shops on the canal.

== History ==
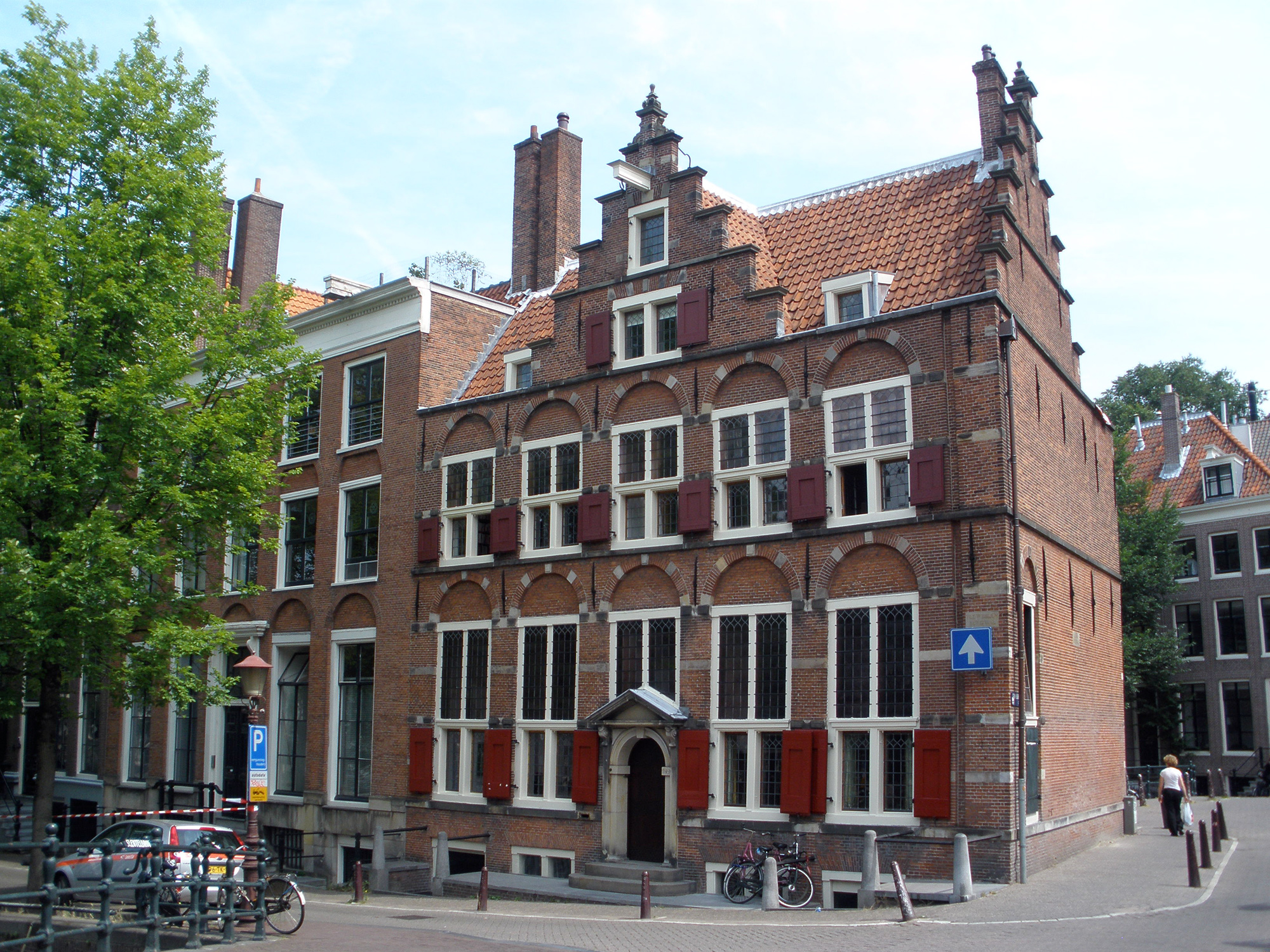
The Huis aan de Drie Grachten (House on the Three Canals) seen from the corner of Grimburgwal and Oudezijds Voorburgwal

The Grimburgwal was originally a tributary of the Amstel, the Grim (meaning "muddy ditch"). In the 14th century it was dug into a moat with an earthen wall ("burgwal") to protect the medieval city. The neighborhood around the canal was called Grimmenes. Amsterdam was further expanded around 1424 and the part between Grimburgwal and Amstel was included in the city. The Grimnessesluis was constructed in 1546, as an extension of the Nes, to close off the Grimburgwal from the Amstel. This lock, sketched by Rembrandt, remained until it was demolished in 1868. Seven years earlier a bridge was built over the Grimburgwal, now part of the Oude Turfmarkt, near the statue of Wilhelmina. The Nes still runs between buildings to the water, reminiscent of the former lock.

== Notable buildings ==
Before the Alteratie (Alteration) of 1578 there were a number of monasteries on or around the Grimburgwal. The Old and New Nunneries were on the current Binnengasthuis site. The Sint Claraconvent was located between the Nes and the Oudezijds Voorburgwal, but did not reach the Grimburgwal, probably because this was originally the city wall. The Gebed zonder End (Prayer Without End) alley, which opens onto the Grimburgwal, is a remnant of this monastery.

On the south side of the Grimburgwal, now the Binnengasthuis site, there was first a "schafferij" (city carpenter's garden), then the De Sleutel brewery (a name preserved in the Sleutelbrug, the stone arch bridge on the Oudezijds Voorburgwal / Grimburgwal corner), and from 1647 the Oudezijds Heerenlogement. This chic inn for distinguished guests was later renamed Lokaal voor Publieke Verkoopingen (Public Salesroom) and used as an auction hall. The building was demolished in 1874 to make way for new buildings on the Binnengasthuis. The entrance gate to this inn has been moved and is now at Keizersgracht 367.

A striking building on the Grimburgwal, which has continued to exist, is the Huis aan de Drie Grachten (House on the Three Canals). This building from 1610 owes its name to the fact that it is surrounded on three sides by canals: the Grimburgwal on the south side, the Oudezijds Voorburgwal on the west side and the Oudezijds Achterburgwal on the east side. It is a double house with a stepped gable on each canal .

During World War II the August Aimé Balkema bookstore in the House on the Three Canals was a clandestine publisher of illegal literature. In the 1980s and 1990s, the Grimburgwal was primarily known as a place where drug addicts offered stolen bicycles for sale. Today, the area is mainly populated by students, tourists, and the public.

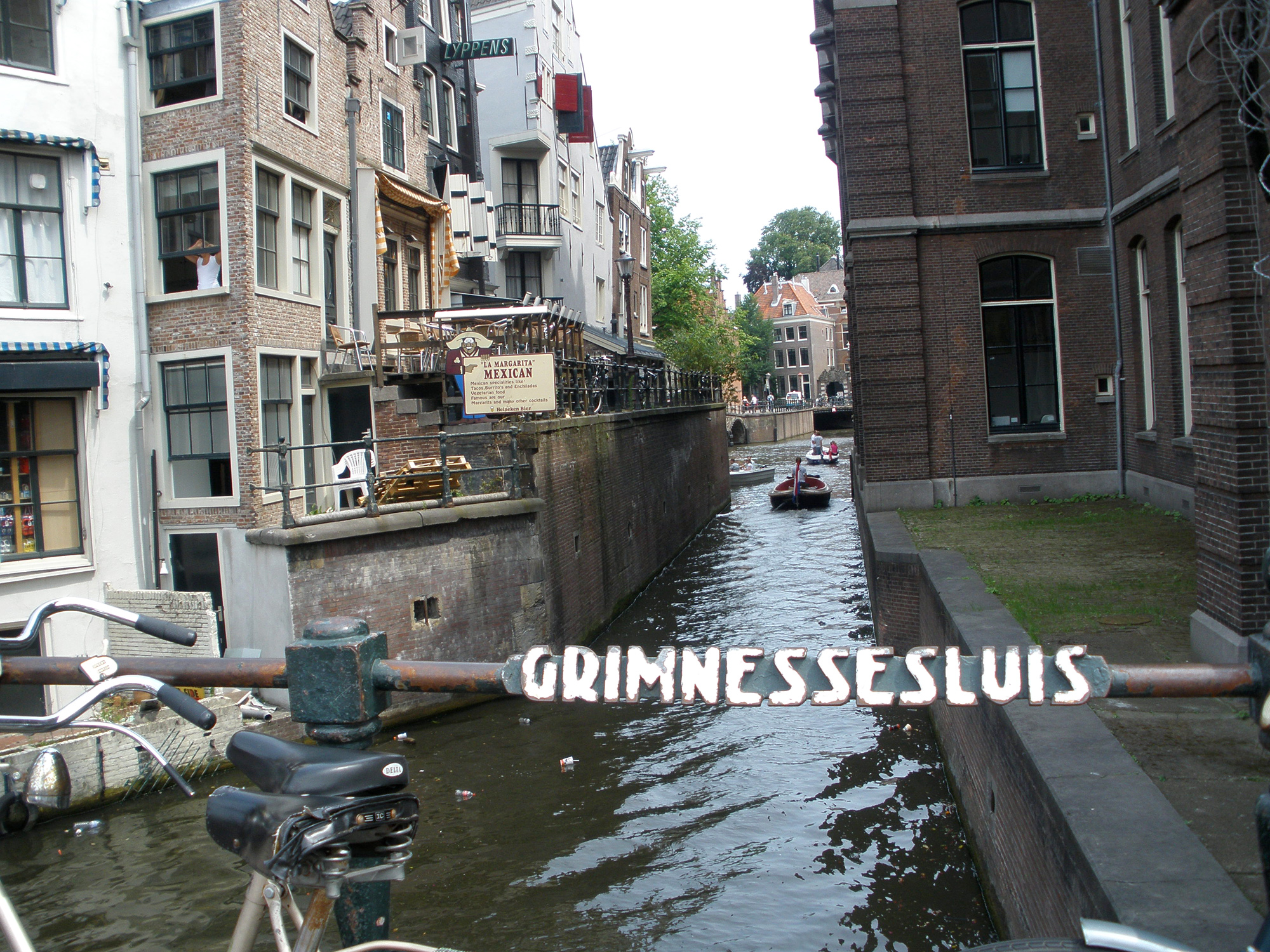
The Grimburgwal seen from the Grimnessesluis

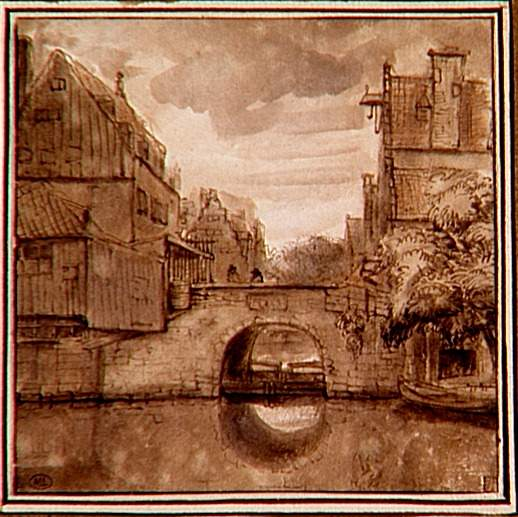
Rembrandt van Rijn. View of the Grimnessesluis in Amsterdam. Pen and brown ink, brown wash.

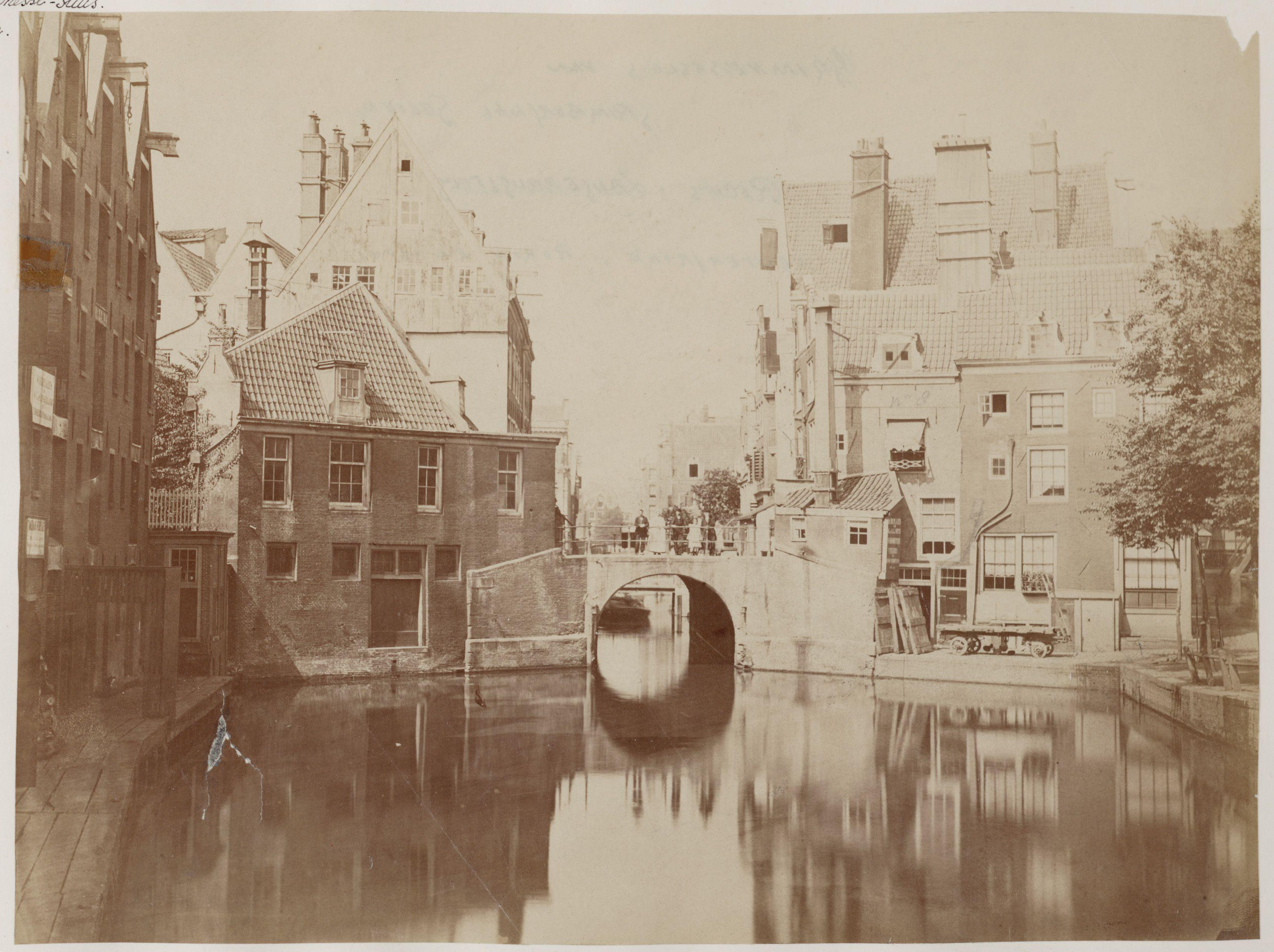
The Grimnessesluis, seen towards the Rokin. Photo: Amsterdam City Archives; around 1860.

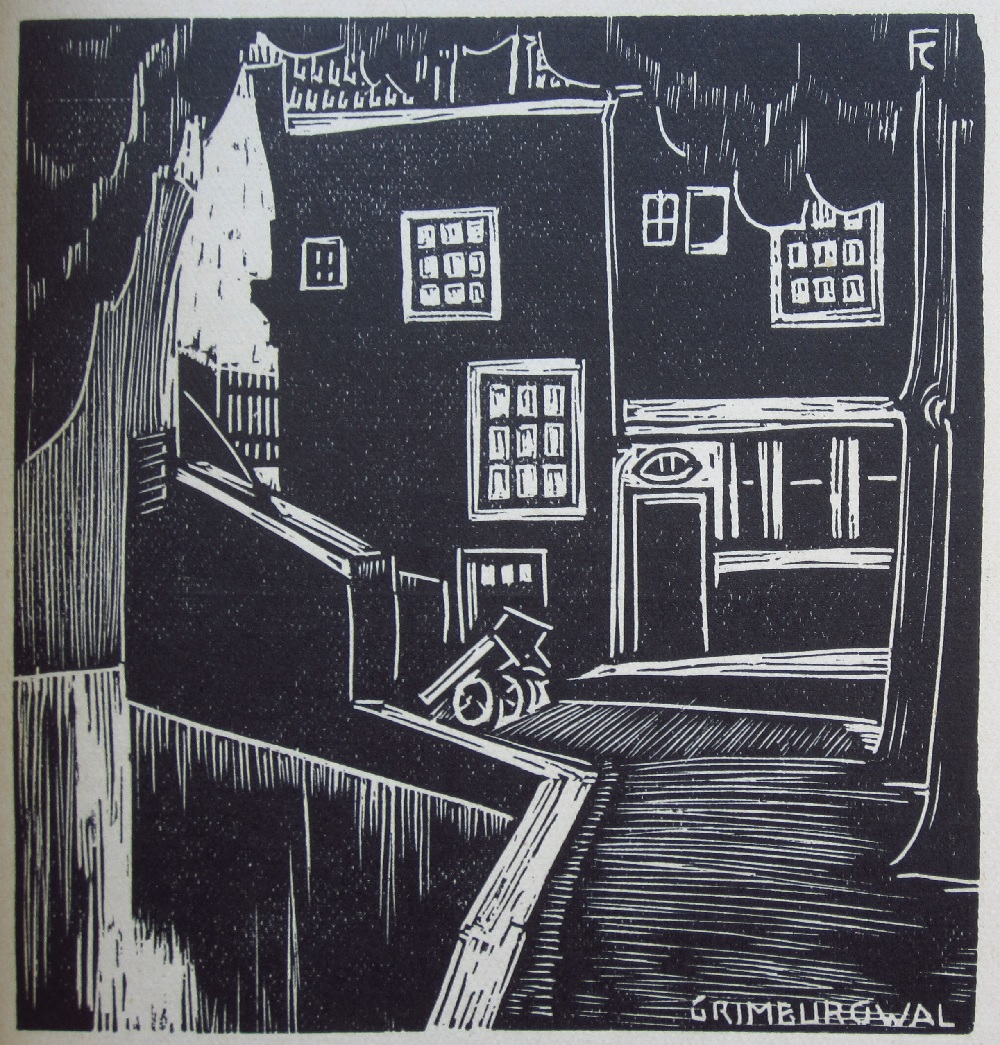
Fré Cohen, 'Grimburgwal' (1926).

== See also ==
- Canals of Amsterdam
