= Huis aan de Drie Grachten =

17th C. canal house in Amsterdam

Coordinates: 52°22′09″N 4°53′41″E

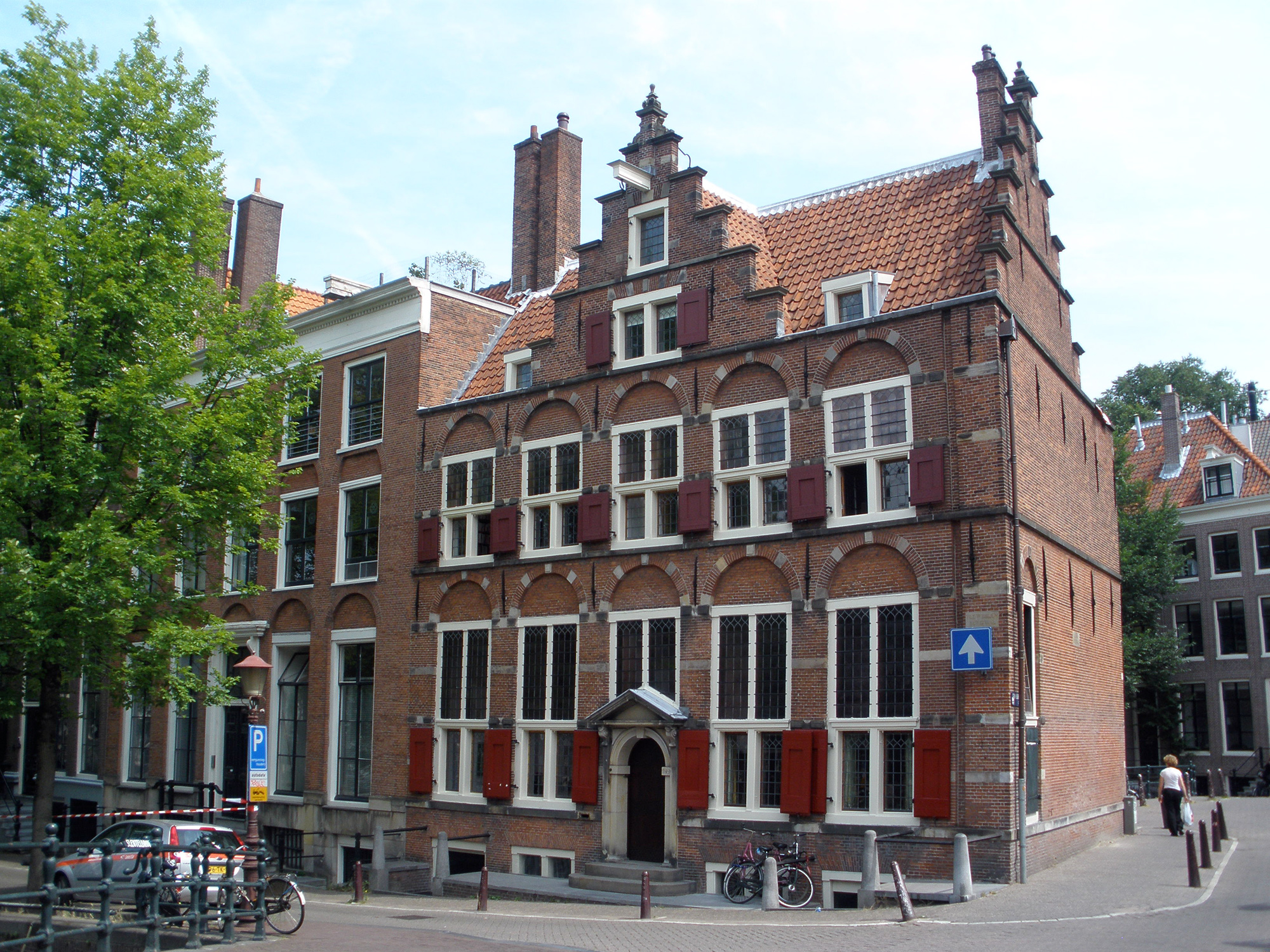
The Huis aan de Drie Grachten viewed from the corner of Grimburgwal and Oudezijds Voorburgwal

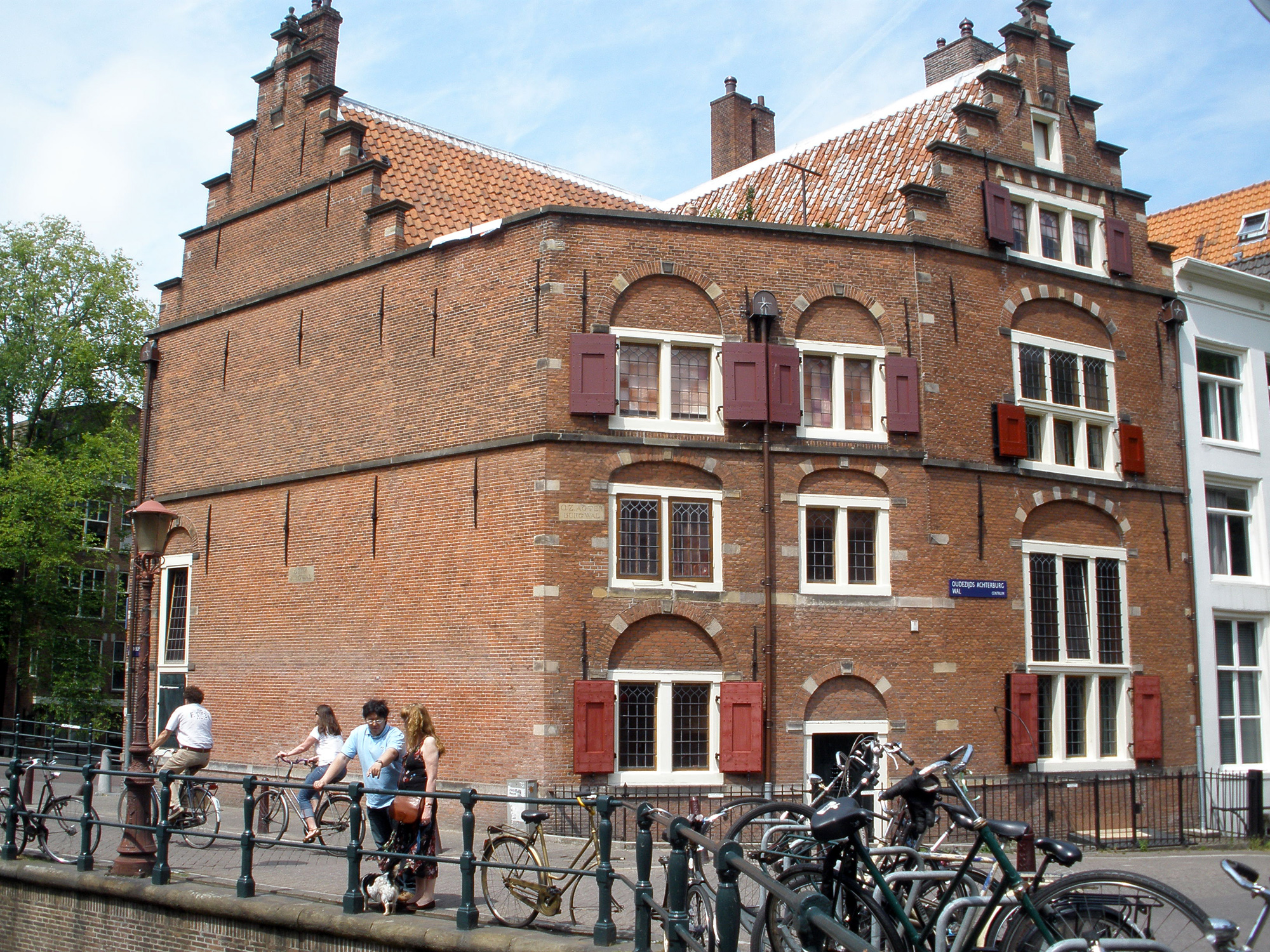
Het Huis aan de Drie Grachten viewed from the corner of Grimburgwal and Oudezijds Achterburgwal

The Huis aan de Drie Grachten or Huis op de Drie Grachten ("House on Three Canals") is a 17th-century canal house in Amsterdam, at the southeastern end of the Wallen district. The name is a reference to the fact that the building faces three different Amsterdam canals. The south facade faces Grimburgwal, the west facade faces Oudezijds Voorburgwal and the east facade faces Oudezijds Achterburgwal. The address is Oudezijds Voorburgwal 249.

The Huis aan de Drie Grachten is a double house in Dutch Renaissance style. A stepped gable crowns each of the three facades. The current structure dates to around 1610, although archeological study has shown that the oldest elements of the house date to the second quartile of the 16th century. The building has rijksmonument (national monument) status.

In 1909, the building underwent large-scale renovations under the supervision of the architect Jan de Meijer. He aimed to restore the building to its original 17th-century state, basing himself on a contemporary painting of the house by Gerrit Berckheyde which is now in the collection of the Amsterdam Museum. During the renovations, the building was given new stepped gables, kruiskozijnen (windows that are divided into four smaller windows by crossbeams), and a sandstone entrance gate. These replaced the original elements which had been demolished in the 18th century. The renovation also stripped the interior of the house of elements which had been added over the centuries. In 2005, the building underwent a second renovation.

There are two large 17th-century mantelplaces within the house. However, it is not known whether these were added during the 1909 renovations, or whether these are original elements of the house.

August Aimé Balkema opened a bookstore in the building in 1936. During the Second World War, the bookstore was used to clandestinely print and publish works of poetry and other literature. A hidden compartment over one of the mantelpieces was uncovered during the renovations in 2005. This compartment was found to contain an archive of wartime documents, including manuscripts and correspondence. The compartment may also have served as a hiding place for (Jewish) onderduikers (people hiding from the Germans).

The building remained in use as a bookstore until 2002. The publishing house Uitgeverij Huis aan de Drie Grachten held office in the building for decades. The publisher focused mainly on literary and linguistic studies. Over Multatuli, a journal dedicated to the Dutch writer Multatuli, was also published here from 1978.
