= Oudezijds Voorburgwal =

Canal in Amsterdam

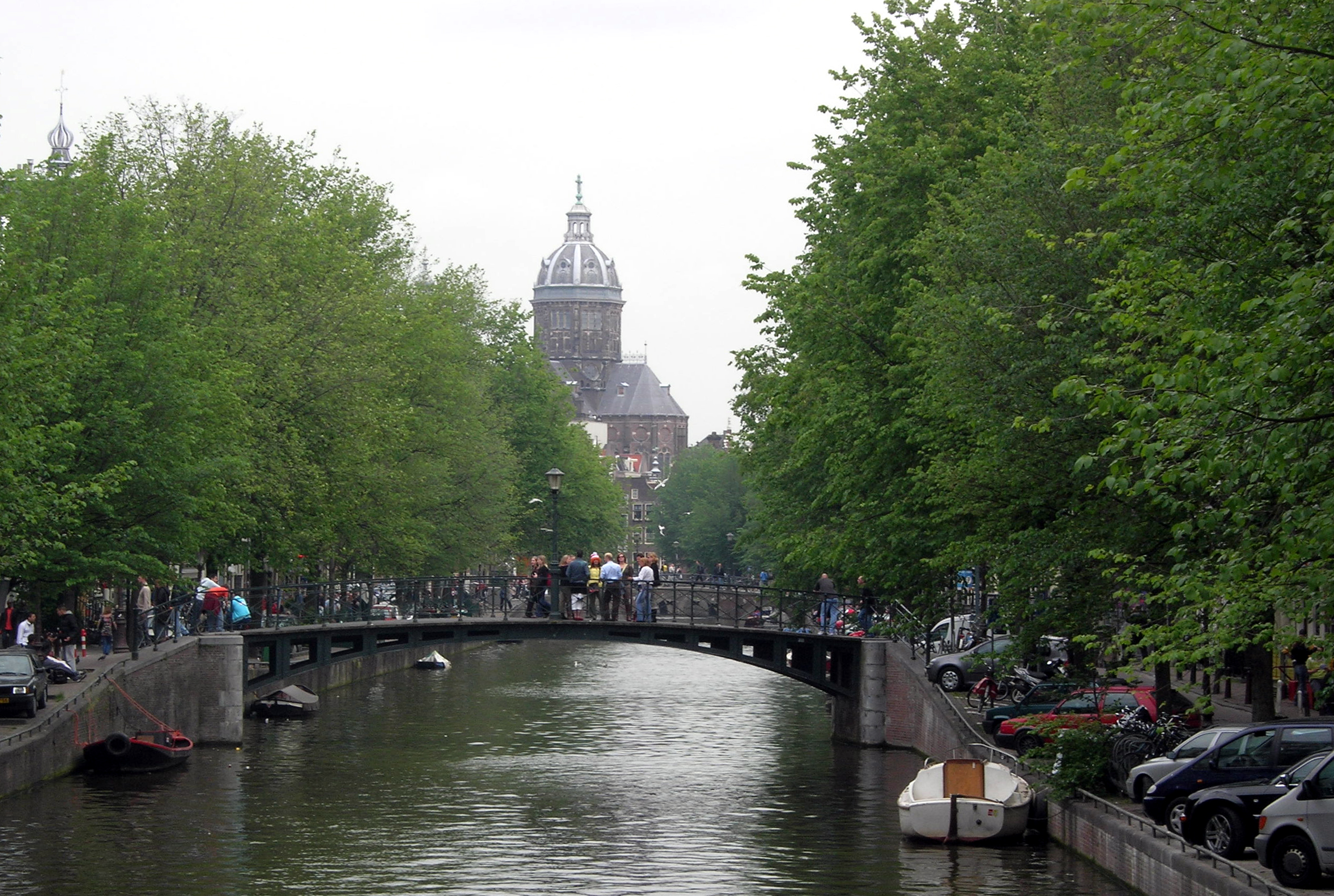
- Oudezijds Voorburgwal

- Location within Amsterdam
- Location: Amsterdam
- Postal code: 1012
- Coordinates: 52.372778°N 4.897222°E
- South end: Grimburgwal
- To: Zeedijk (Sea wall)

The Oudezijds Voorburgwal, often abbreviated to OZ Voorburgwal, is a street and canal in De Wallen in the center of Amsterdam. It runs from the Grimburgwal in the south to the Zeedijk in the north, where it changes into the Oudezijds Kolk, which drains into the IJ.

The bridge over the OZ Voorburgwal between Damstraat and Oude Doelenstraat (bridge 204) forms a dividing line between the northern Wallendeel and the southern part. It is one of the streets of the Red Light District, with sex shops, window prostitutes, peep shows, brothels, bars and coffee shops. The Bulldog has several branches and a hotel here. The canal is also lined with monumental canal houses from the Dutch Golden Age, and the remains of the many monasteries that were located here in the Middle Ages.

== History ==
The OZ Voorburgwal was originally a creek that was later dug into a canal around the eastern part of the city, the old side. Before 1385 the Amstel divided the city of Amsterdam into two almost equal parts, the old side with the Old Church and the new side with the New Church. To protect the city, a moat was dug on each side with a burgwal behind it, an earthen wall, with a wooden palisade for protection. When new ramparts were constructed behind these ramparts around 1385, on both the old and new sides the existing rampart became the Voorburgwal and the new rampart became the Achterburgwal. That is how Oudezijds Voorburgwal, Oudezijds Achterburgwal, Nieuwezijds Voorburgwal and Nieuwezijds Achterburgwal (now Spuistraat) were created.

In the 17th and 18th centuries the canal was usually called the Fluwelenburgwal. When the buildings on the Oudezijds Voorburgwal were built in the Golden Age, canal gardens were laid out behind the mansions. Almost all of them have since disappeared.

The Bierkaai (beer quay) was the quay on the Oudezijds Voorburgwal, near the Oude Kerk, where barrels of beer arrived and porters loaded and unloaded the heavy barrels. The residents of this part of Amsterdam were known as invincible fighters. The proverbial "fight against the beer quay" is derived from this: dedication to a hopeless cause.

== Famous buildings ==
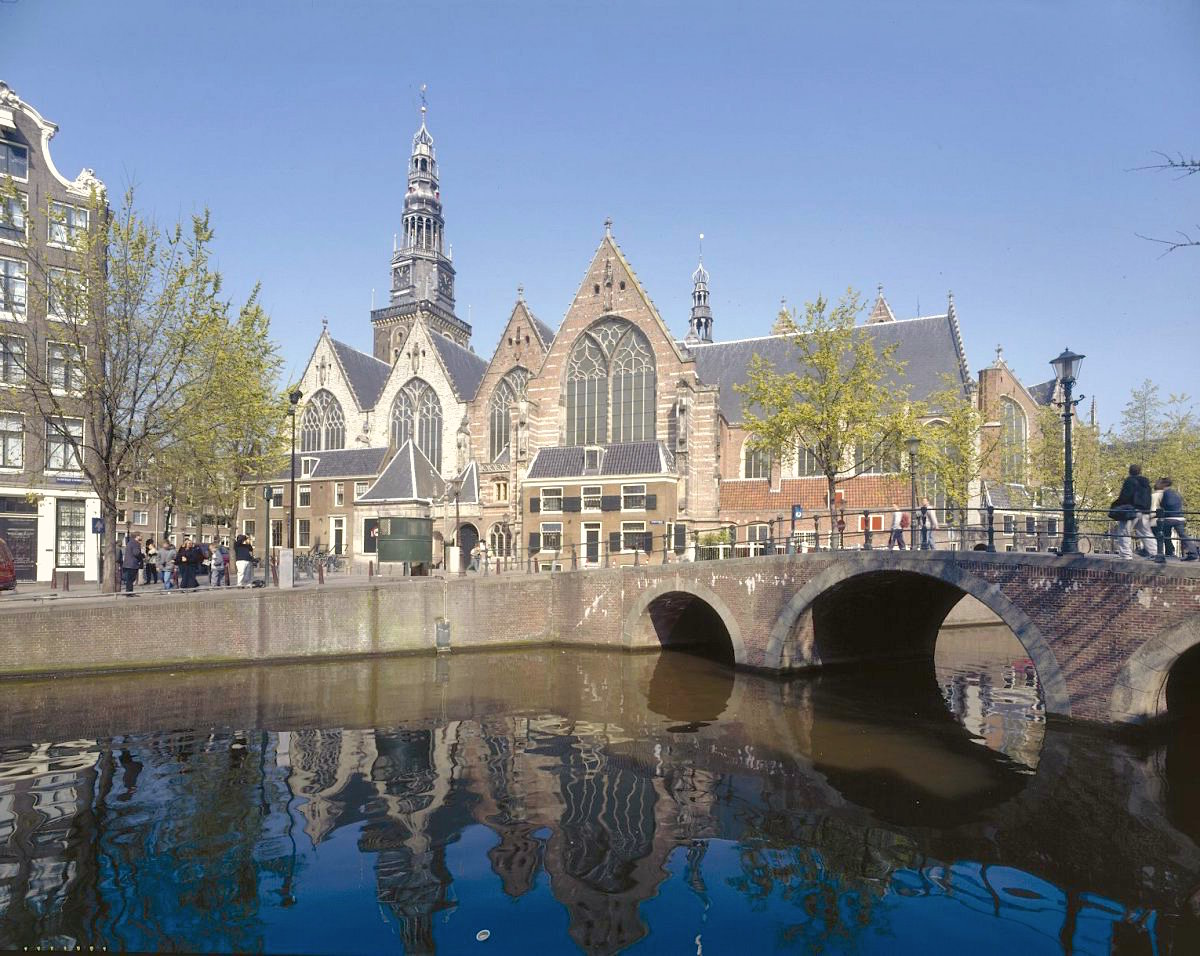
The Oude Kerk is the most important monumental building on the Oudezijds Voorburgwal.

There are more than a hundred national monuments on Oudezijds Voorburgwal. Some well-known buildings there include:

- The Oude Kerk, the oldest building in Amsterdam, on the Oudekerksplein between OZ Voorburgwal and Warmoesstraat.
- The Prinsenhof (OZ Voorburgwal 197), now the five-star hotel The Grand. This former monastery was converted into the Prinsenhof after the Alteratie (Alteration) in 1578. When King Louis Bonaparte moved to the Royal Palace in 1808, the city council moved to the Prinsenhof. The building served as Amsterdam's town hall until the Stopera became operational in 1988. The extension of the City Hall with modern façade in the Amsterdam School style to a design by Nicolaas Lansdorp dates from 1926.
- The Agnietenkapel (OZ Voorburgwal 231), a monastery chapel from 1470, rebuilt in 1631 into the Athenaeum Illustre, the precursor of the University of Amsterdam. The University Museum has been housed here since 1988.
- Ons' Lieve Heer op Solder (Our Lord in the Attic; OZ Voorburgwal 40), a former clandestine church, now a cultural history museum.
- De Gecroonde Raep (OZ Voorburgwal 57), a house built by Hendrick de Keyser. This is a well-known example of a stepped gable in the Amsterdam Renaissance style of De Keyser.
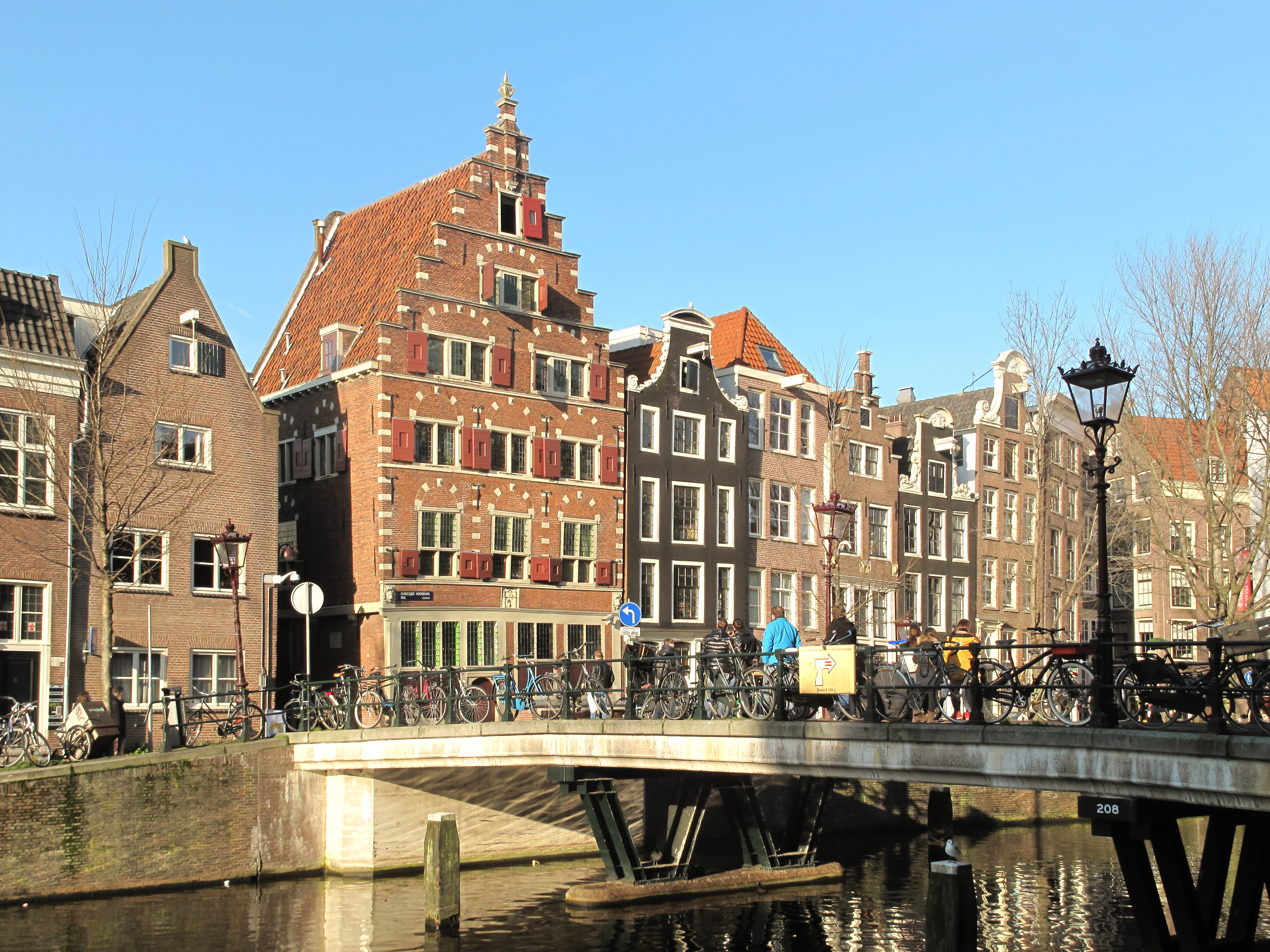
  Oudezijds Voorburgwal with the striking stepped gable of Het Wapen van Riga (OZ Voorburgwal 14), a 17th-century merchant's house
- Het Wapen van Riga (OZ Voorburgwal 14), a 17th-century merchant's house.
- Vredenburgh, a building whose oldest parts date from the 15th century.
- Stadsbank van Lening (De Lommerd), Oudezijds Voorburgwal 300.
- The Huis aan de Drie Grachten (House on the Three Canals) stands at the southern end of the Oudezijds Voorburgwal at the point where this canal meets the Oudezijds Achterburgwal and the Grimburgwal.
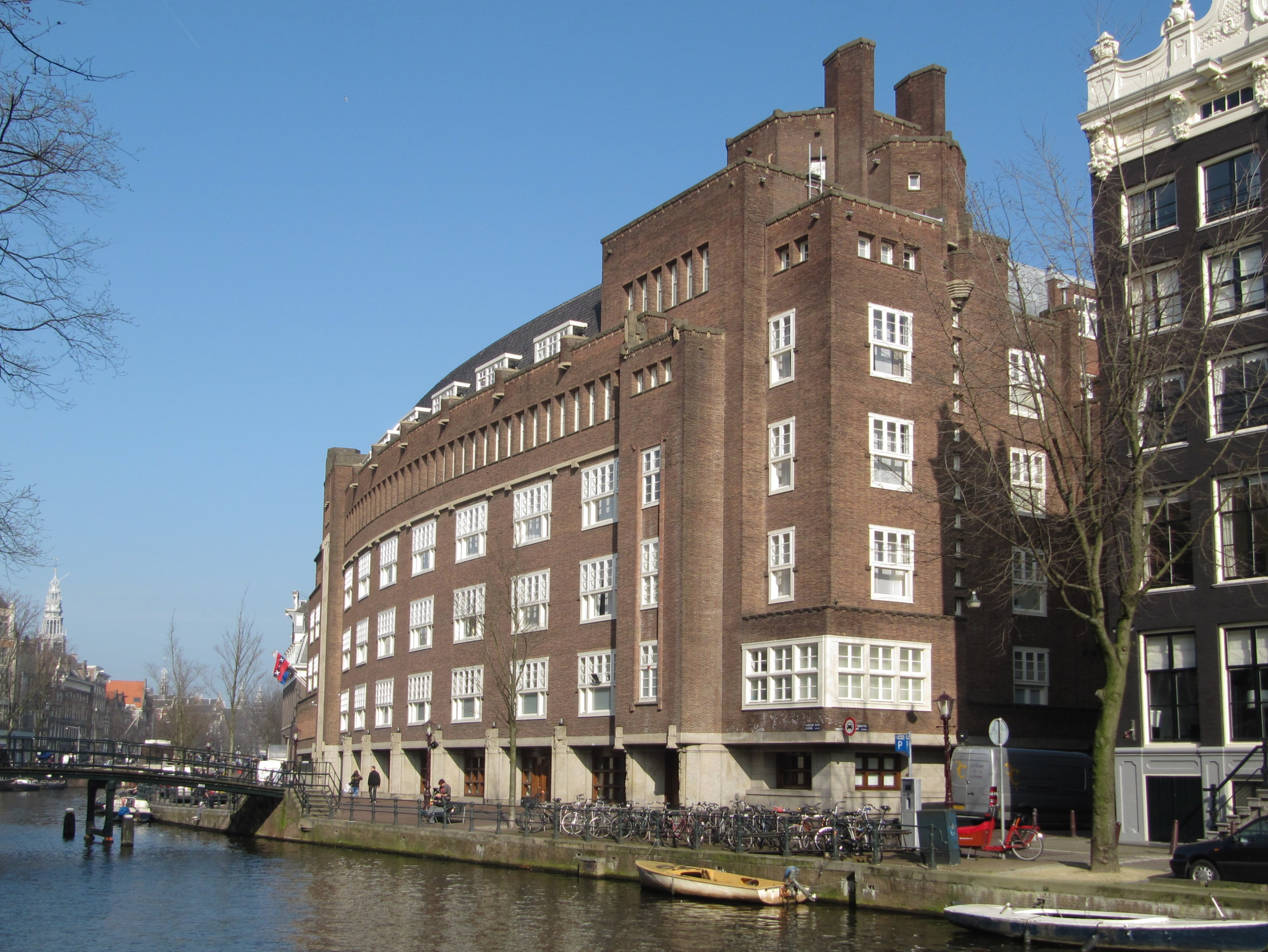
  The extension of the city hall with modern façade in the Amsterdam School style to a design by N. Lansdorp from 1926

== Bridges ==
The Oudezijds Achterburgwal is spanned by eight bridges, all fixed.

Number	Name	Street	Passage width	Passage height	Managed by
208	Armbrug	Oudezijds Armsteeg	8.00	1.80	Centrum
207	Liesdelsluis	Lange Niezel	5.43	1,80	Centrum
206	Oudekerksbrug	Oudekennissteeg	11.59	1.80	Centrum
205	Sint-Jansbrug	Sint Jansstraat	15,59	2,38	Centrum
204	Varkenssluis	Damstraat	5,18	2,06	Centrum
203	Lommertbrug	Enge Lombardsteeg	6,60	1,94	Centrum
105	Makelaarsbruggetje	Sint Barberensteeg	6.90	1.98	Centrum
201	Sleutelbrug	Grimburgwal	6.96	1,92	Centrum

With the passage heights in the table, one must take into account the fact that the Oudezijds Achterburgwal, like all other canals in the city center, is 0.40 metres (1 ft 4 in) below the NAP.

Notes on the three northern bridges:

- the Arm Bridge was never an arched bridge, but was built as a flat bridge and was modernized as such
- the Liesdelburg was an arch bridge, became a flat beam bridge and was restored as an arch
- the Oudekerks bridge was a wooden bridge and was not converted into an arch bridge until the late 20th century ("architectural lie")

== Gallery ==
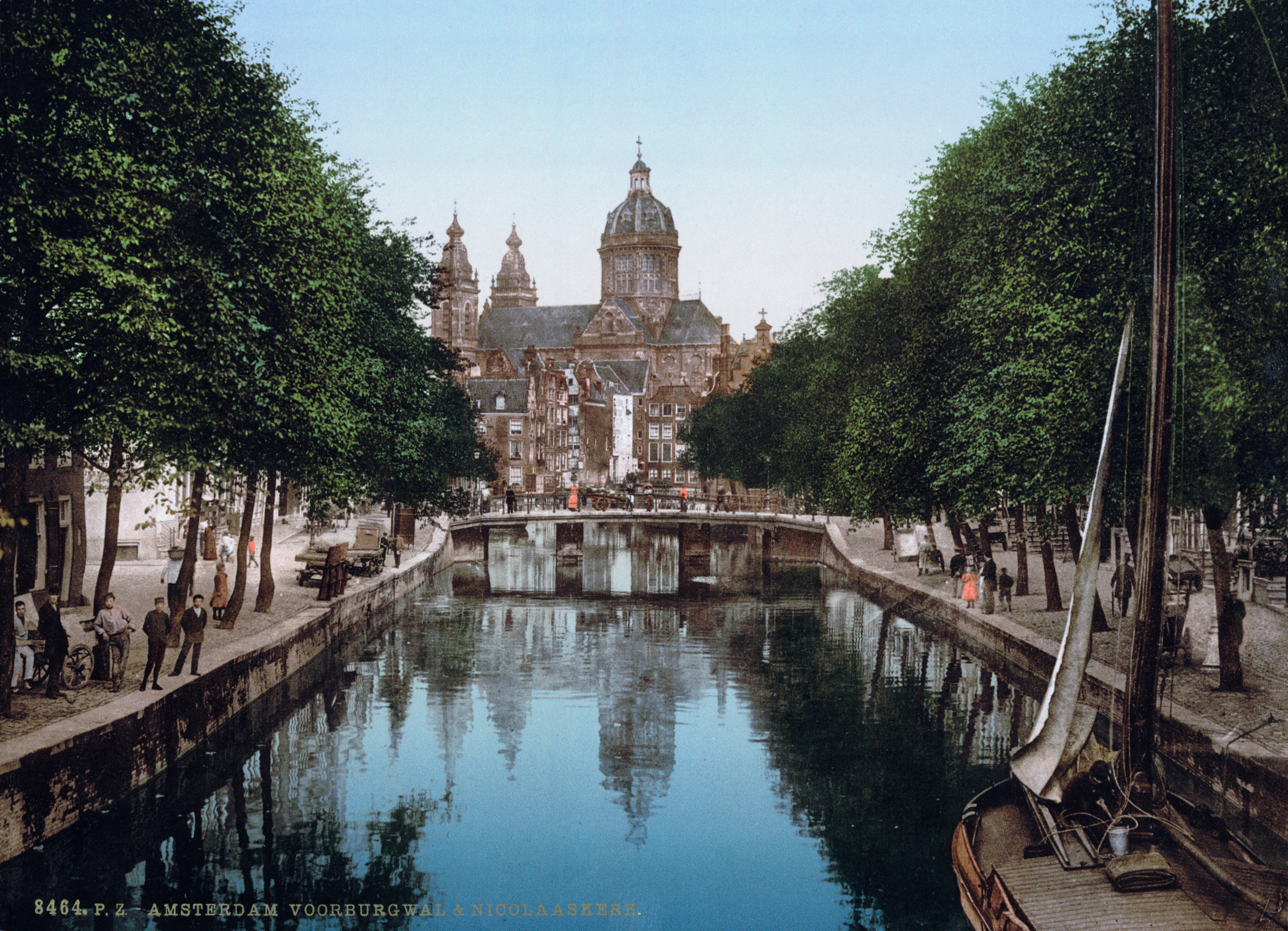
On the north side of the Oudezijds Voorburgwal, the view is dominated by the St. Nicholas Basilica. Photo from around 1890.

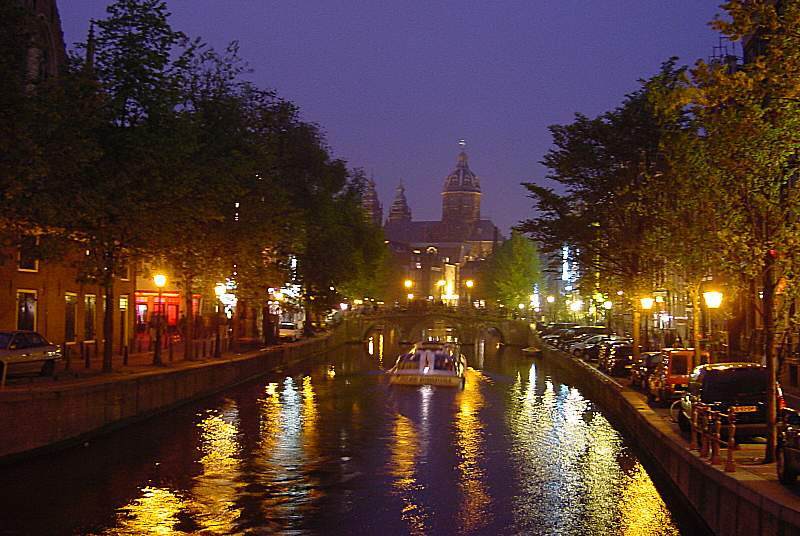
Oudezijds Voorburgwal and silhouette of St. Nicholas' Basilica by night

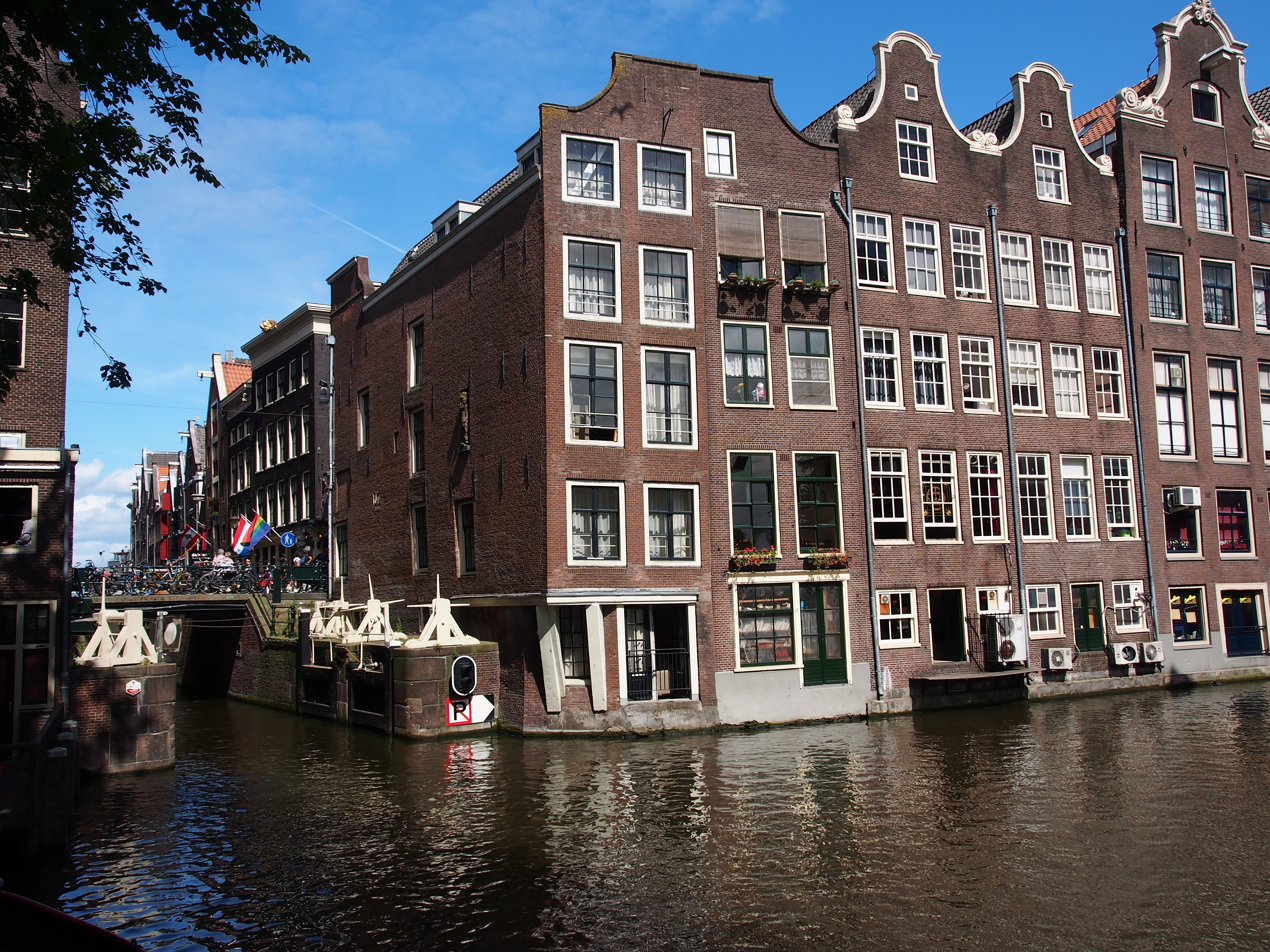
Oudezijds Voorburgwal, Zeedijk and Oudezijds Kolk

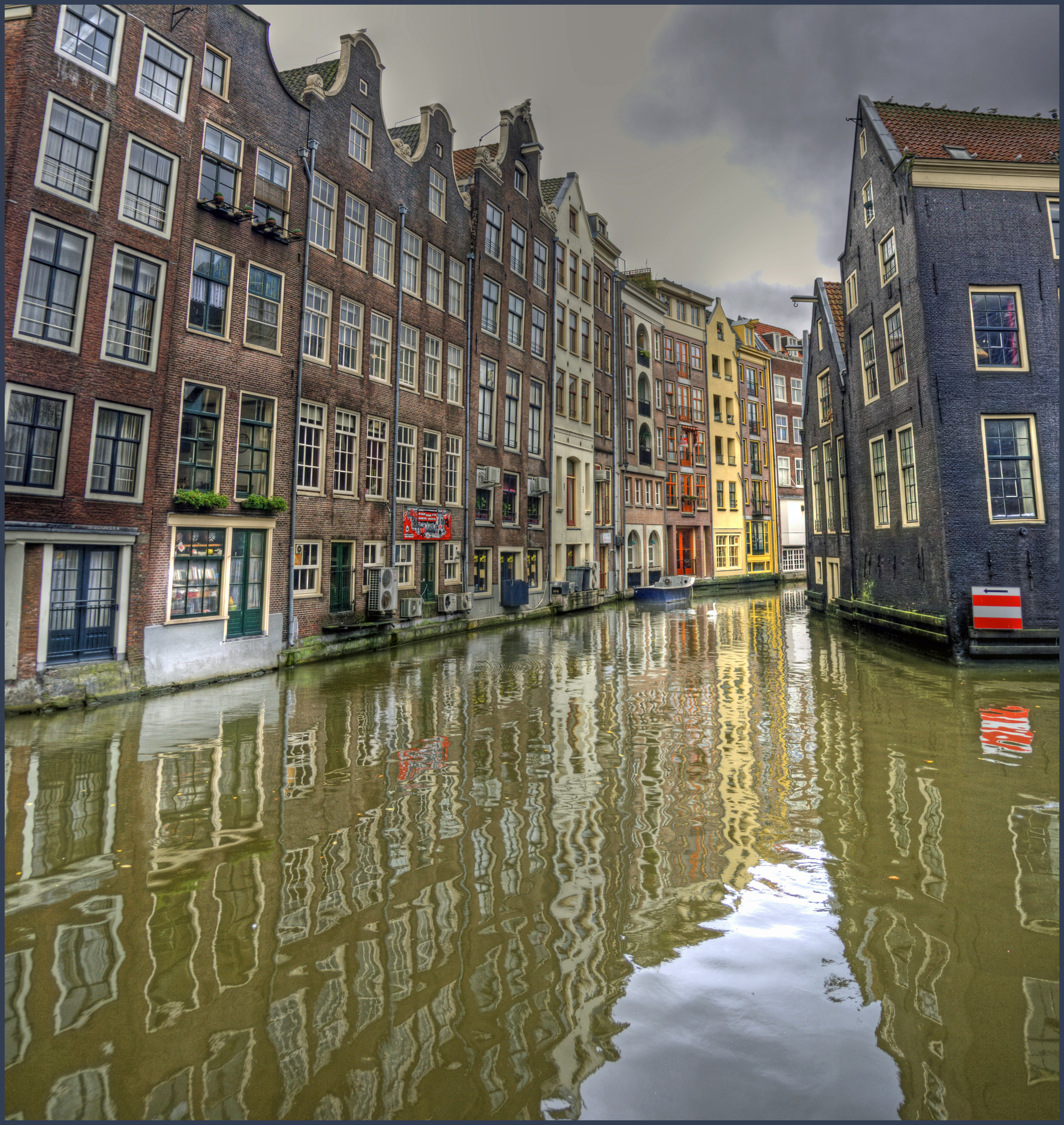
Oudezijds Voorburgwal corner Oudezijds Achterburgwal

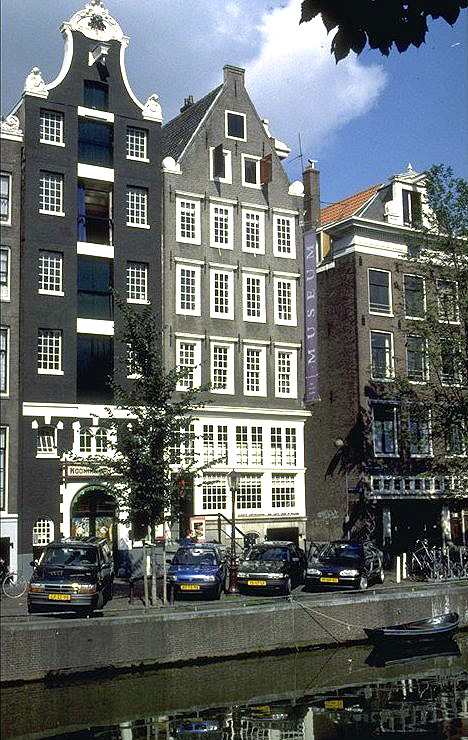
Ons' Lieve Heer op Solder (Our Lord in the Attic). Oudezijds Voorburgwal 40.

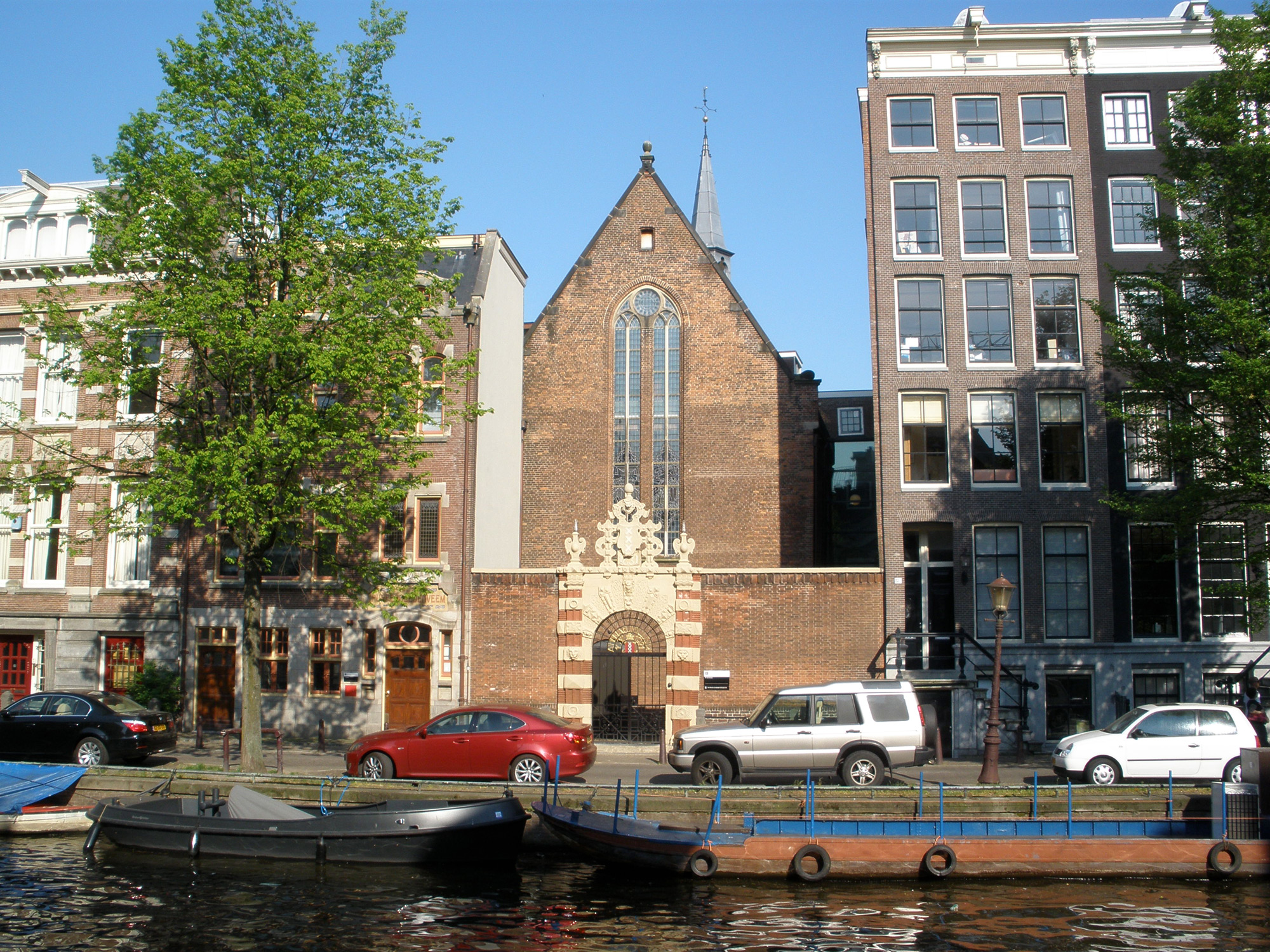
Agnietenkapel (Chapel of the Convent of Saint Agnes)

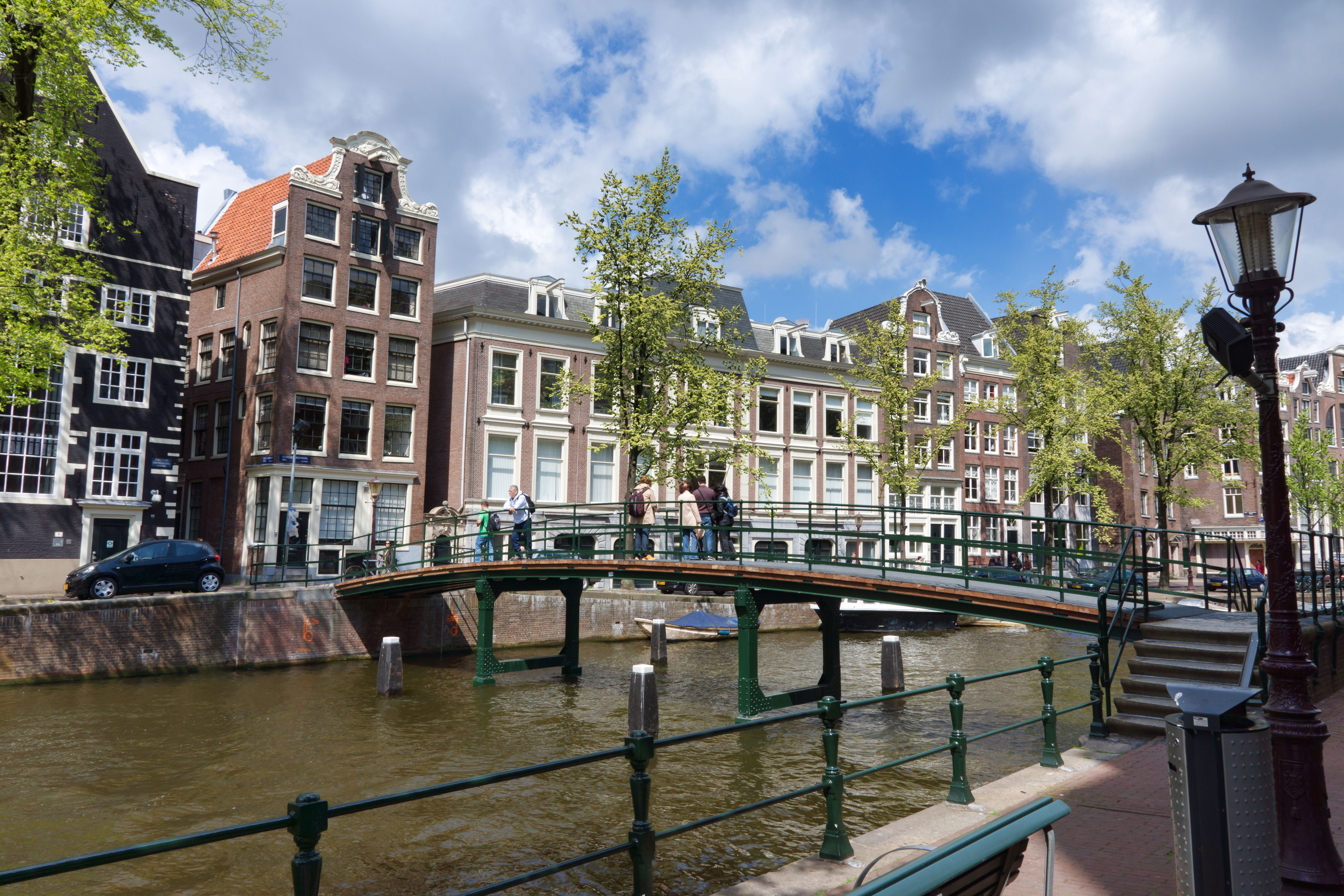
Iron pedestrian bridge (bridge no. 105; Makelaarsbruggetje) near the Lommerd.

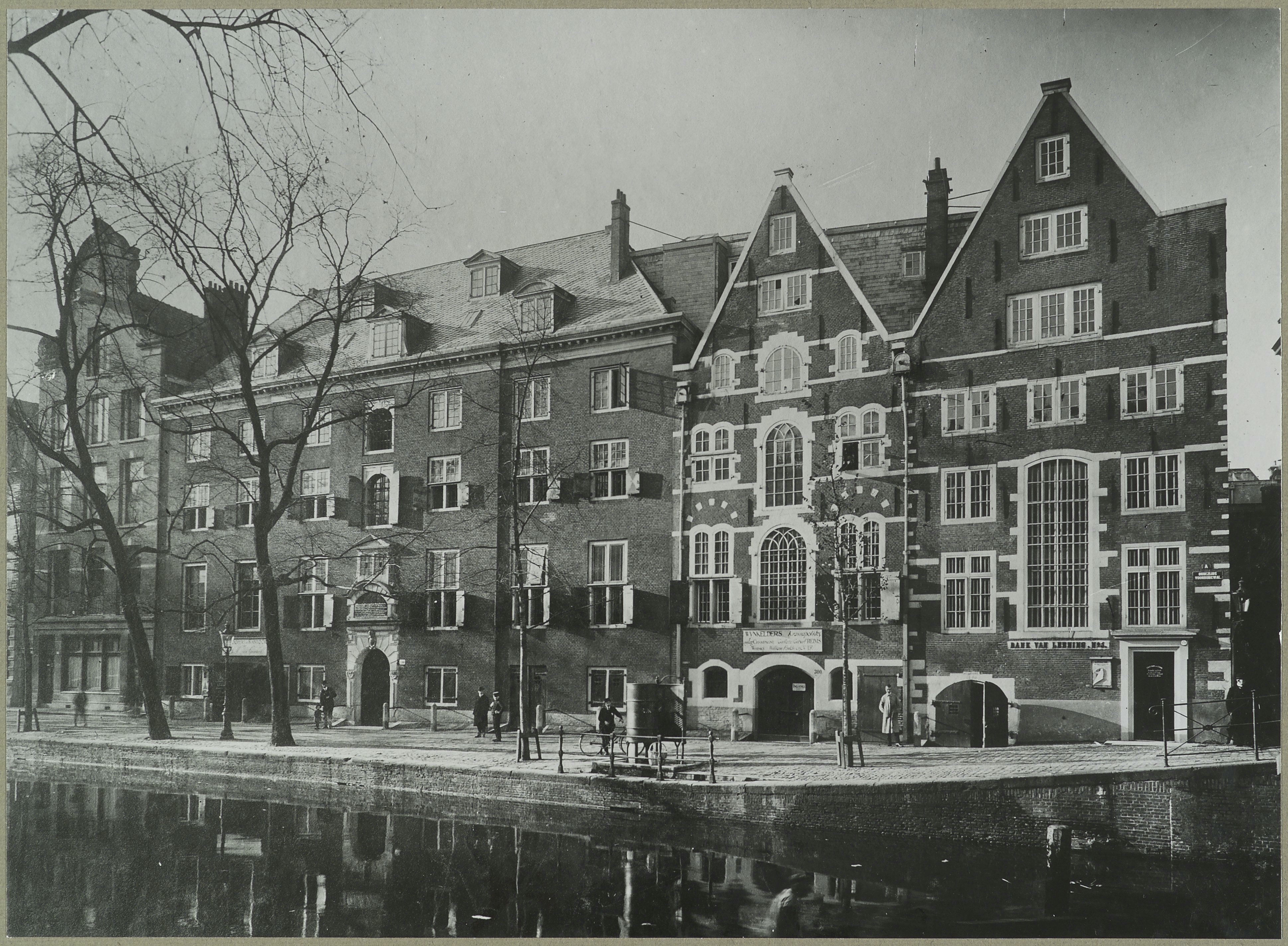
Stadsbank van Lening (De Lommerd), Oudezijds Voorburgwal 300 in 1940.

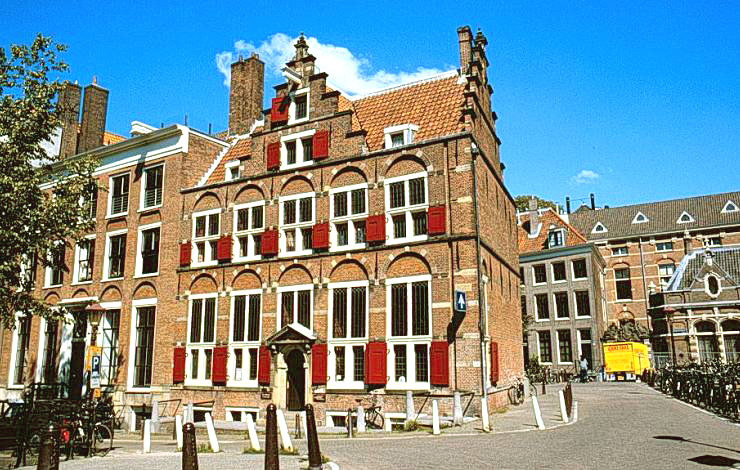
Huis aan de Drie Grachten (House on the Three Canals), OZ Voorburgwal 249.

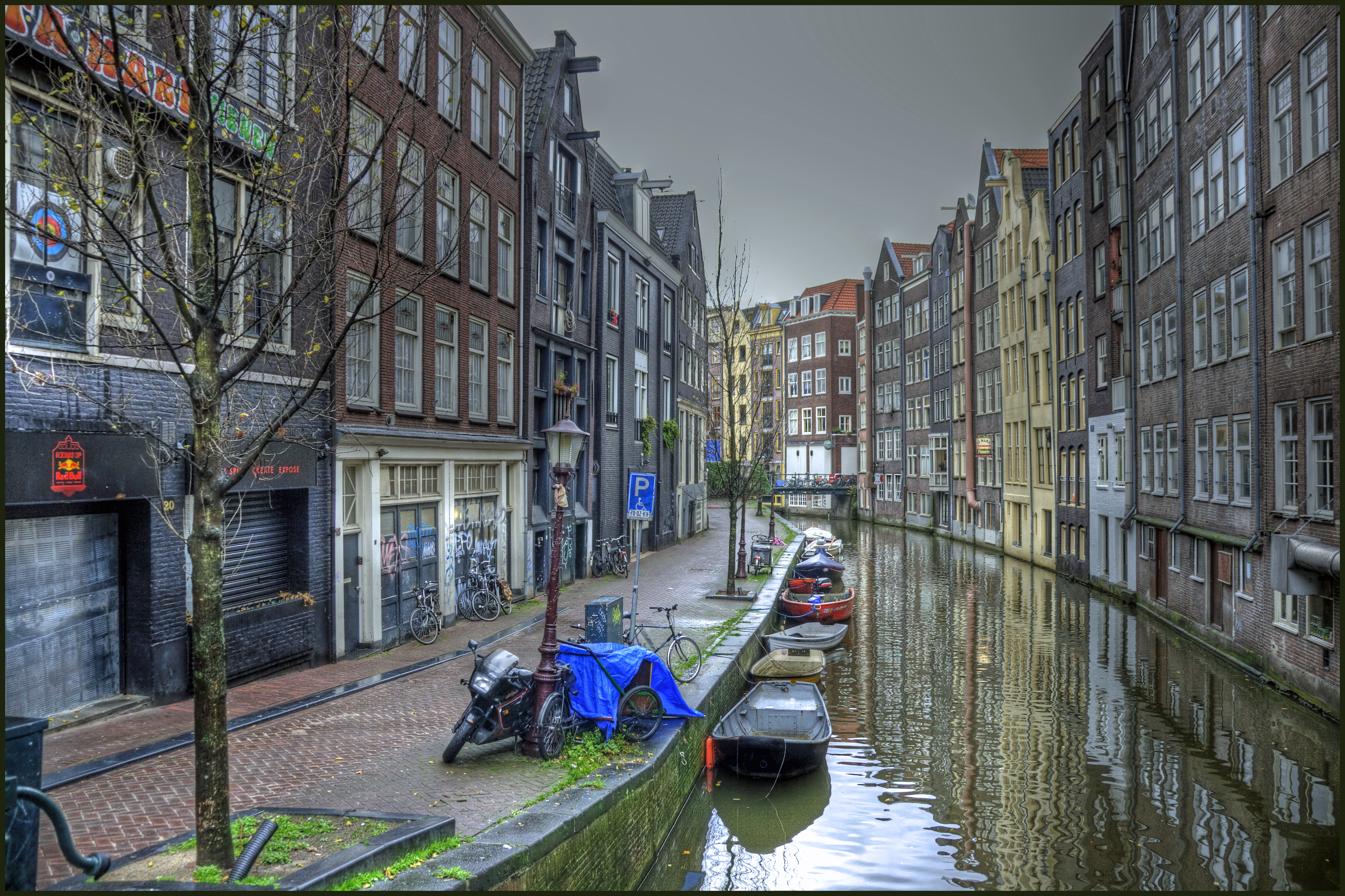
Oudezijds Voorburgwal

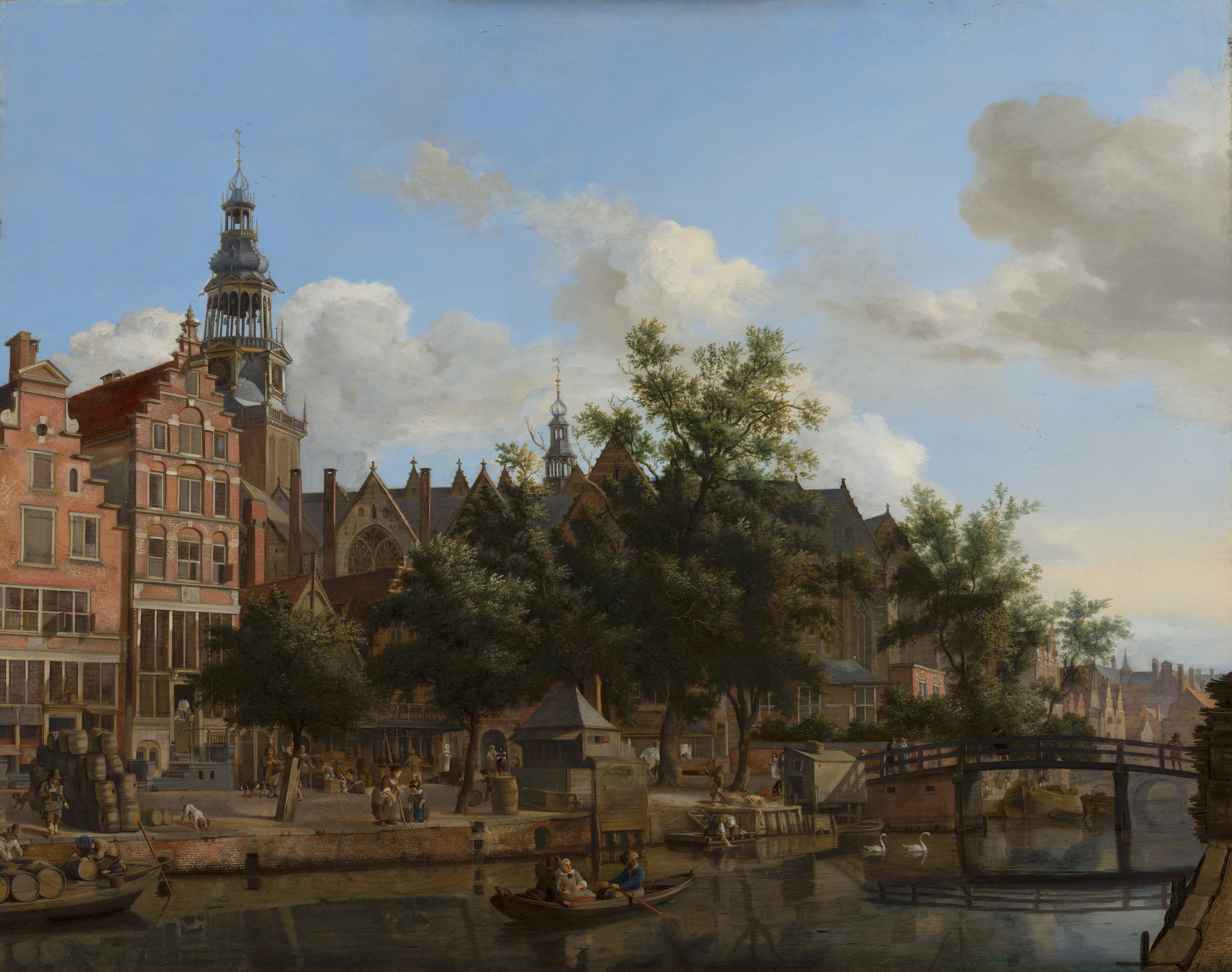
Jan van der Heyden, View of Oudezijds Voorburgwal c. 1670 (Mauritshuis)

== Trivia ==
The Oudezijds Voorburgwal is depicted on the ace of the standard Dutch deck of cards.

== See also ==
- Canals of Amsterdam
