= Nes (Amsterdam) =

Street in Amsterdam, Netherlands

Coordinates: 52°22′15″N 4°53′36″E

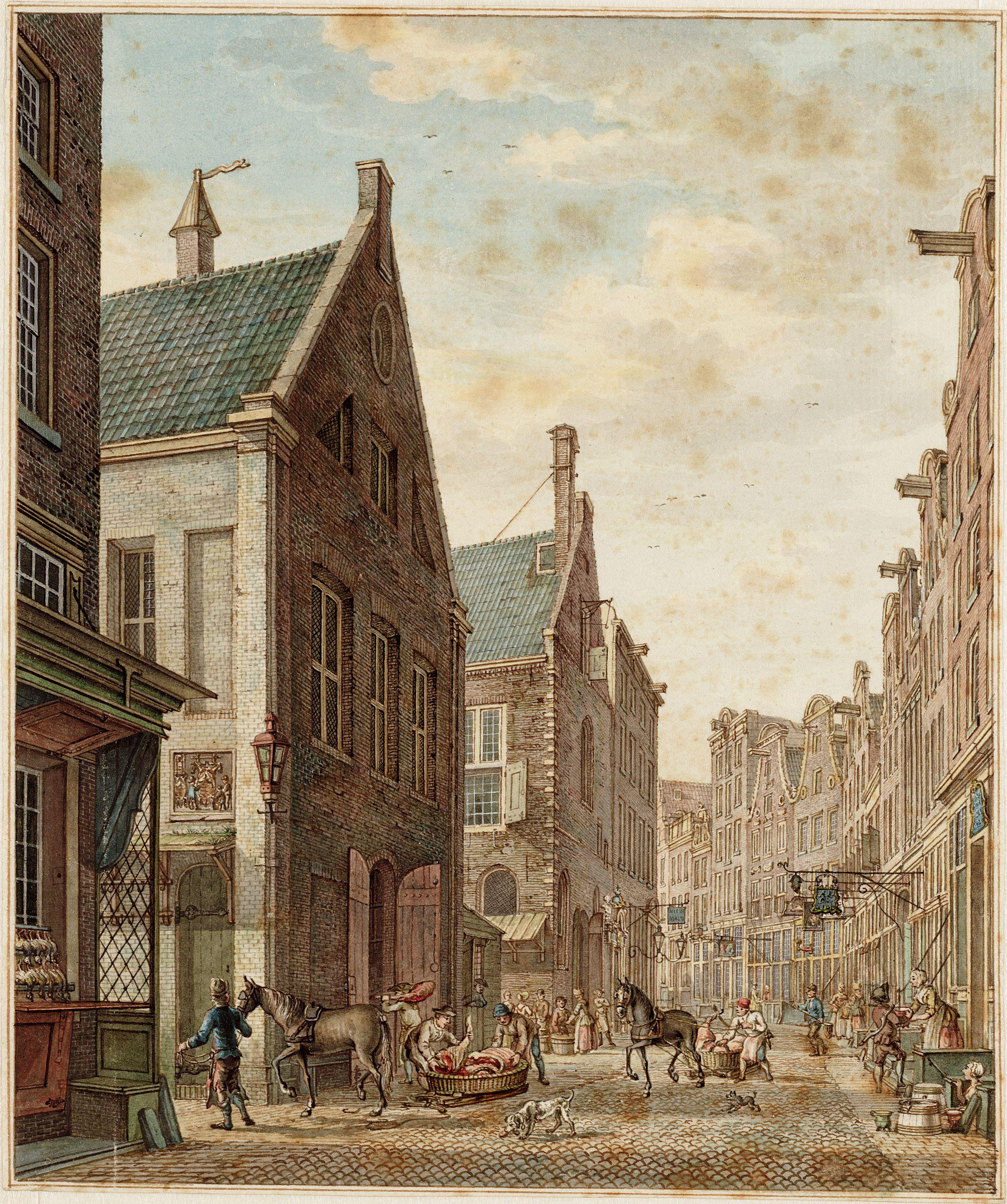
Nes, a 1741 print.

Nes ([ˈnɛs]; sometimes called de Nes, "the Nes") is a narrow, old, street in central Amsterdam, Netherlands. It runs parallel to and to the east of Rokin, between Dam Square to the north and Grimburgwal to the south.

The Dutch word nes means headland or spit (compare the English word "ness", often found as a suffix in placenames, such as Inverness). Until the seventeenth century, the northern part of Nes (roughly near where Dam Square now is) was called Gansoord ("Goose-oord"). (An oord (nl) is a piece of land between where two rivers meet.) The name most likely described the nature of the street's original situation among the waterways of Amsterdam.

In 1500, there were around 20 monasteries in Amsterdam; of which five were in Nes. The street was nicknamed Gebed zonder End ("Prayer without end"). A side alley bears that name to this day (nl). Open practice of Catholicism was banned after the Alteratie of 1578, and the monasteries were given over to other uses. For example, the Binnengasthuis was founded as a hospital on the sites of the Old and New Nunneries.

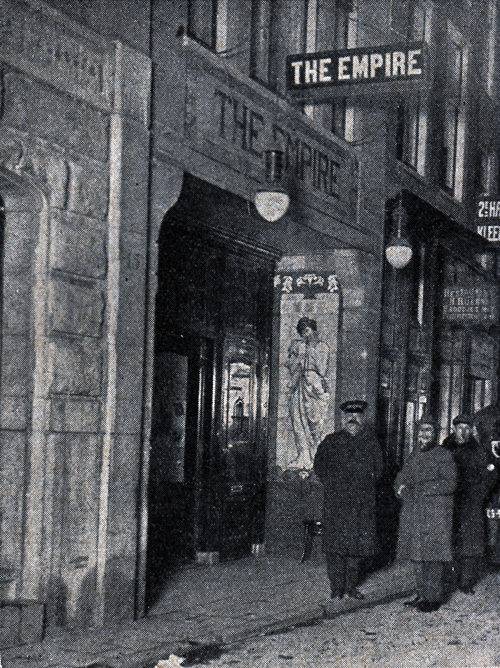
The Empire at Nes 17 c. 1921.

From early in the nineteenth century, Nes became a centre for entertainment. Its attractions included brothels, café-chantants, the Salon des Variétés, the Theatre Tivoli, and artists' cafés. Later, it became important in the tobacco trade.

From 1911 (or earlier) until the mid 1930s, No. 17 was home to one of the earliest gay bars: The Empire.

Since the 1960s, Nes has become known as a theatrical quarter; with sites including Frascati, Engelenbak, De Brakke Grond (a Flemish cultural centre), TOBACCO Theater (a rijksmonument), and the Comedy Theatre in de Nes.

The New York Times claimed it houses 'the birthplace of capitalism."
