= Stadsbank van Lening, Amsterdam =

Not-for-profit city Bank van Lening in Amsterdam, Netherlands

Coordinates: 52°22′13.76″N 4°53′39.01″E

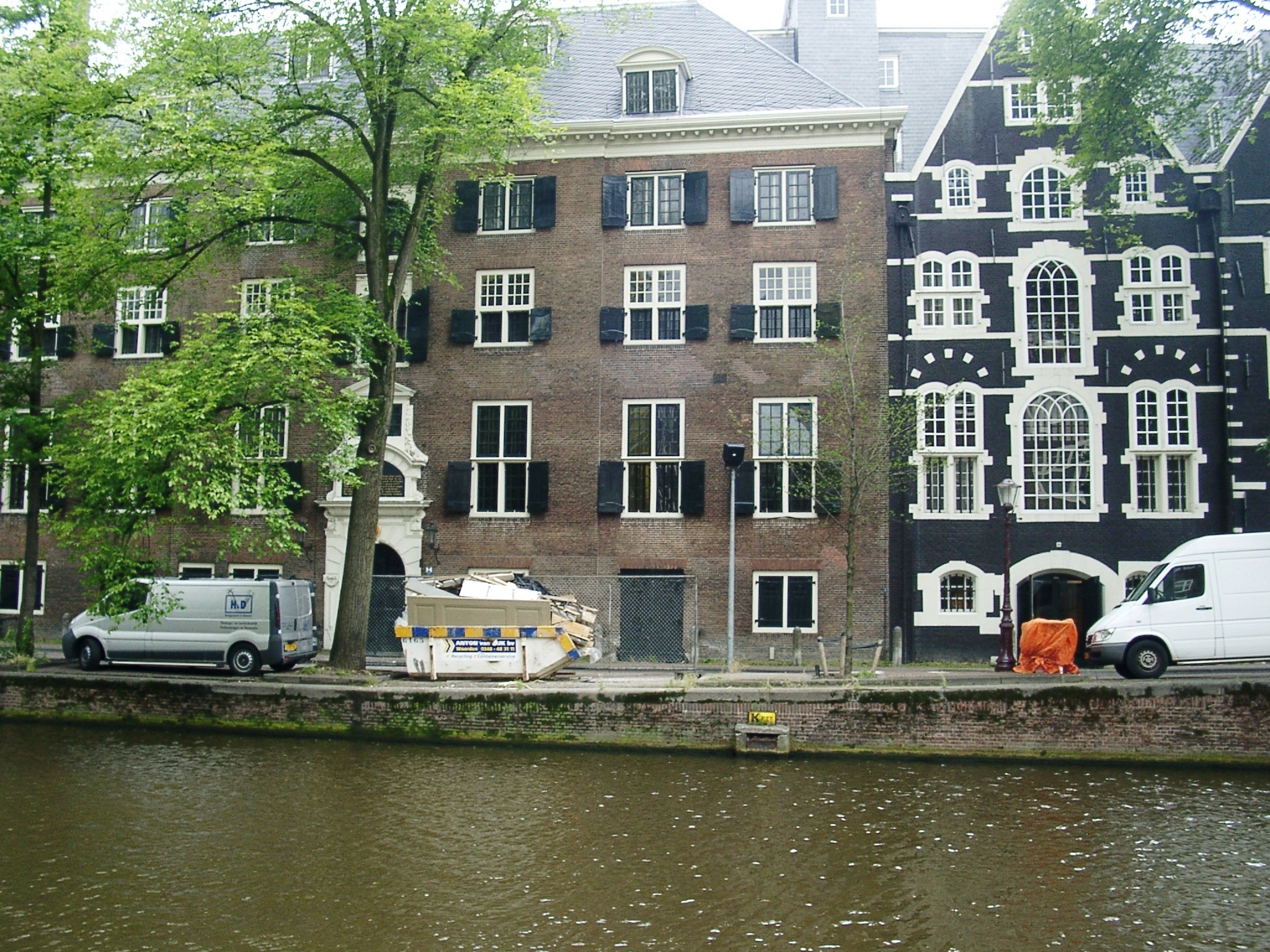
Stadsbank van Lening on the Oudezijds Voorburgwal.

The Stadsbank van Lening (Dutch pronunciation: [ˈstɑtsbɑŋk fɑn ˈleːnɪŋ]) is a not-for-profit city Bank van Lening dating from 1614 on the Oudezijds Voorburgwal in Amsterdam, Netherlands. It is the oldest credit distributor in Amsterdam and today has about 85 employees working here and in offices on the Albert Cuypstraat, Bijlmerplein and Osdorpplein.

== History ==
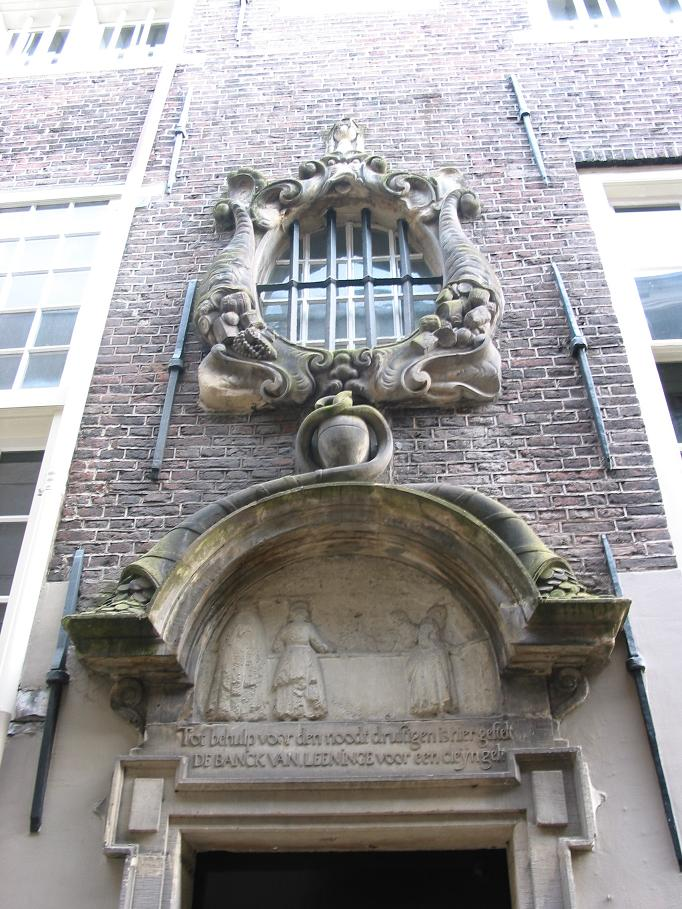
Side entrance

The bank was built in 1614 as a conversion of an old warehouse used by the poorhouse O.Z. Huiszittenhuis that had been used to store peat for the inhabitants. In 1658 the poet Joost van den Vondel became a clerk there. He worked a total of 10 years for the bank and his "bank chair" has been kept.

== Text above the doorway ==
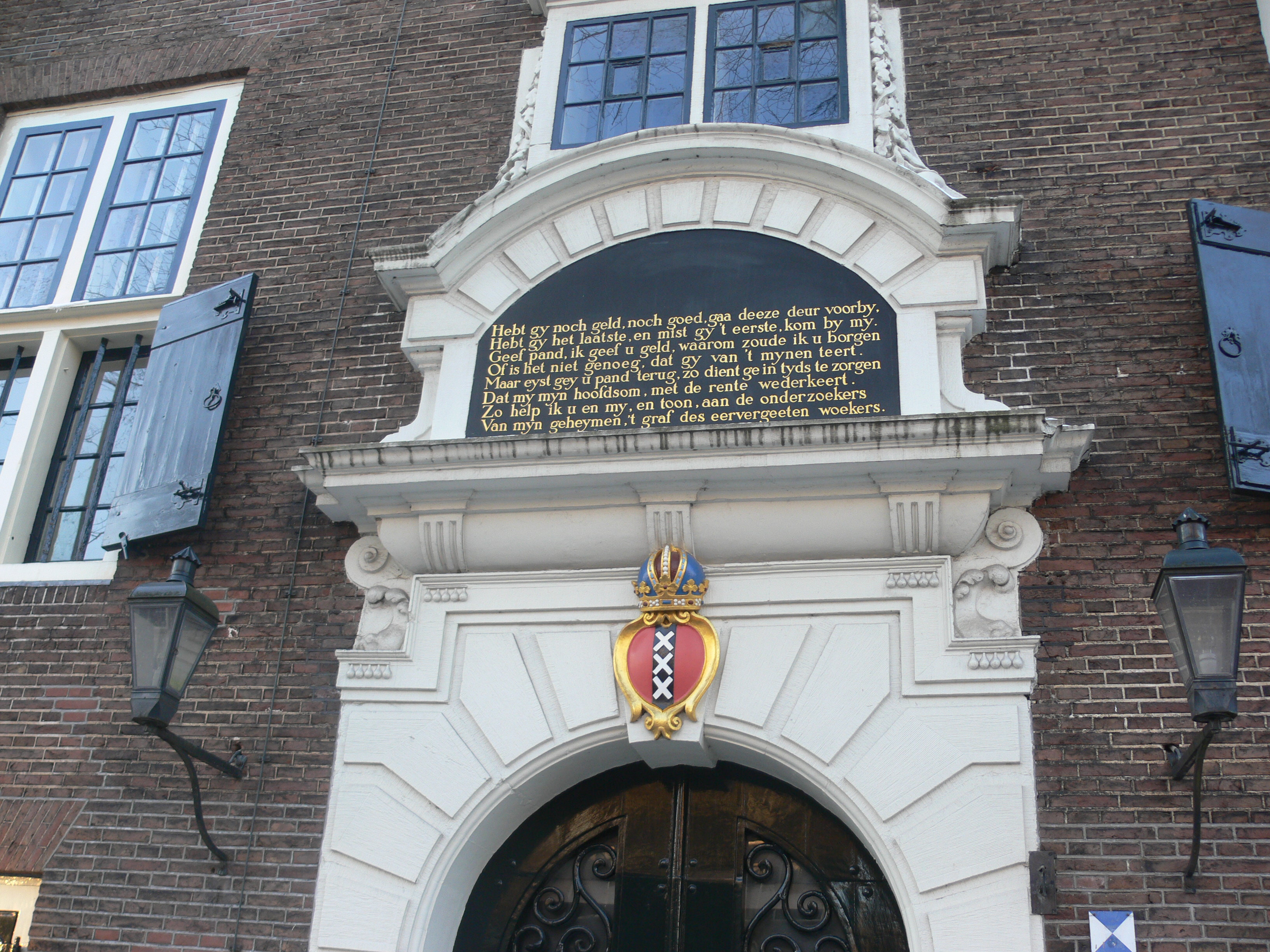
The doorway with text above the entrance

Written by Balthazar Huydecoper in 1740:

Hebt gy noch geld, noch goed: gaa deze deur voorby.
Hebt gy 't laatste, en mist gy 't eerste, kom by my.
Geef pand, ik geef u geld. waarom zoude ik u borgen?
Of is 't u niet genoeg dat gy van 't mynen teert?
Maart eyst gey u pand terug, zo dient ge in tyds te zorgen,
Dat my myn hoofdsom, met de rente wederkeert.
Zo help ik u en my, en toon, aan de onderzoekers
Van myn geheymen, 't graf des eervergeeten woekers.

Translation:

Have you not money, nor goods, pass this door by.
Have you the latter, and miss you the first, come to me.
Give pawn, I give you money. Why should I support you?
Or is it not enough that you live off me?
But if you demand your pawn back, you must take care in time,
That you repay my sum, with interest.
Thus I help you and me, and show the auditors
Of my secrets, the grave of the forgotten loansharks.

== See also ==
- List of banks in the Netherlands
