= Oudezijds Achterburgwal =

Canal in Amsterdam

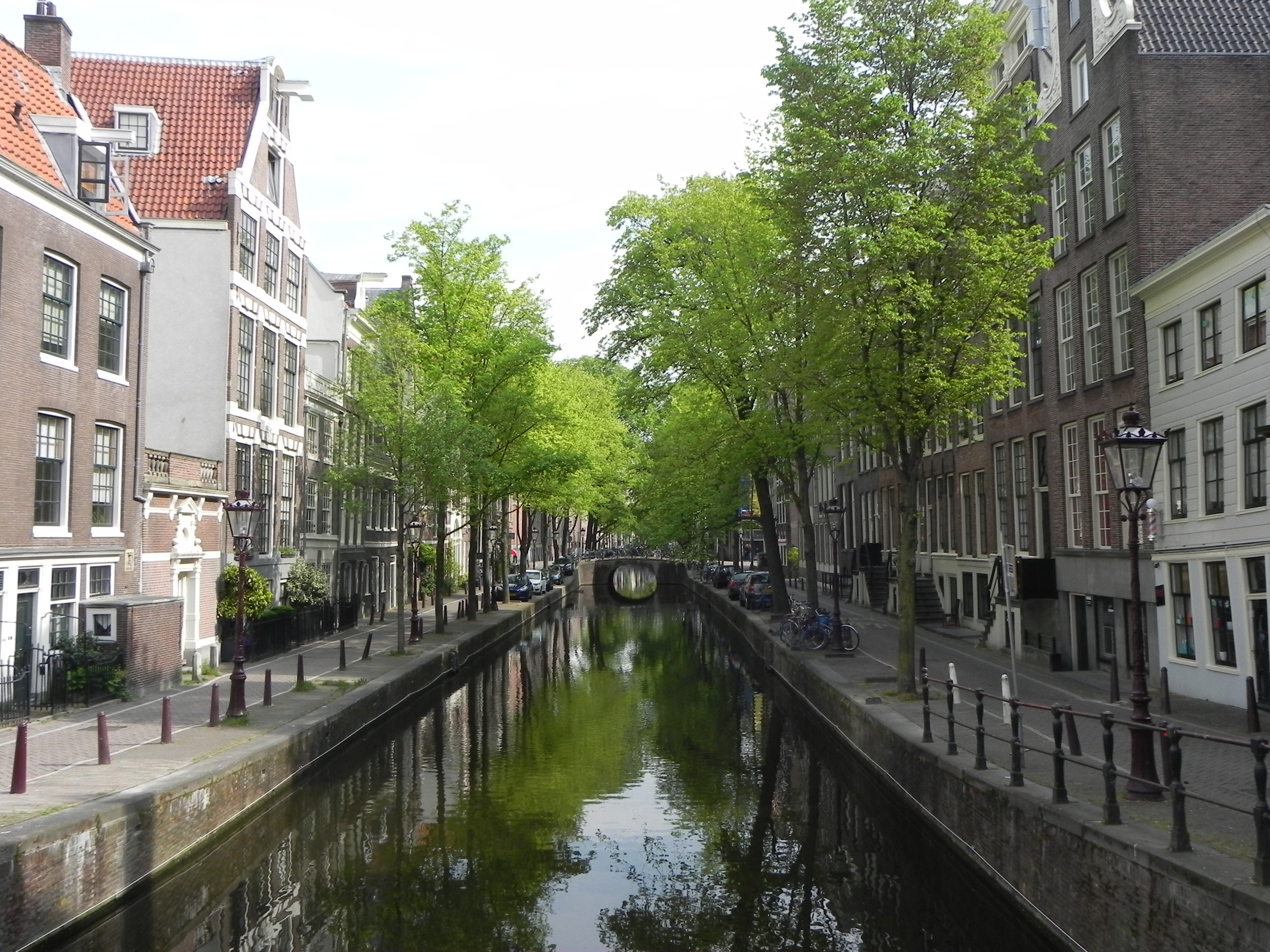
- Oudezijds Achterburgwal by day

- Location within Amsterdam
- Location: Amsterdam
- Postal code: 1012
- Coordinates: 52.3725°N 4.897778°E
- South end: Grimburgwal
- To: Oudezijds Kolk

The Oudezijds Achterburgwal, often abbreviated to OZ Achterburgwal, is a street and canal in De Wallen, the red light district in the center of Amsterdam.

== Location and characteristics ==
Just like the Oudezijds Voorburgwal, the OZ Achterburgwal runs from the Grimburgwal in the south to the Zeedijk in the north, where the canal changes into the Oudezijds Kolk, the outlet into the IJ .

North of the Korte Niezel / Korte Stormsteeg, which are connected by bridge 210, the houses on the east side are directly on the water of the Oudezijds Achterburgwal. They are the rear facades of the Zeedijk buildings, so there is no quay along this section.

The bridge over the Voorburgwal OZ between Oude Doelenstraat and Oude Hoogstraat (bridge 215) forms a dividing line between the noisy northern Wallendeel and the quiet southern part. The northern part is full of sex shops, window prostitution, peep shows, brothels, coffee shops and bars. The Hash, Marihuana & Hemp Museum is located on the northern part of the OZ Achterburgwal. The southern part includes University of Amsterdam buildings such as the Binnengasthuis and the Oudemanhuispoort.

== History ==
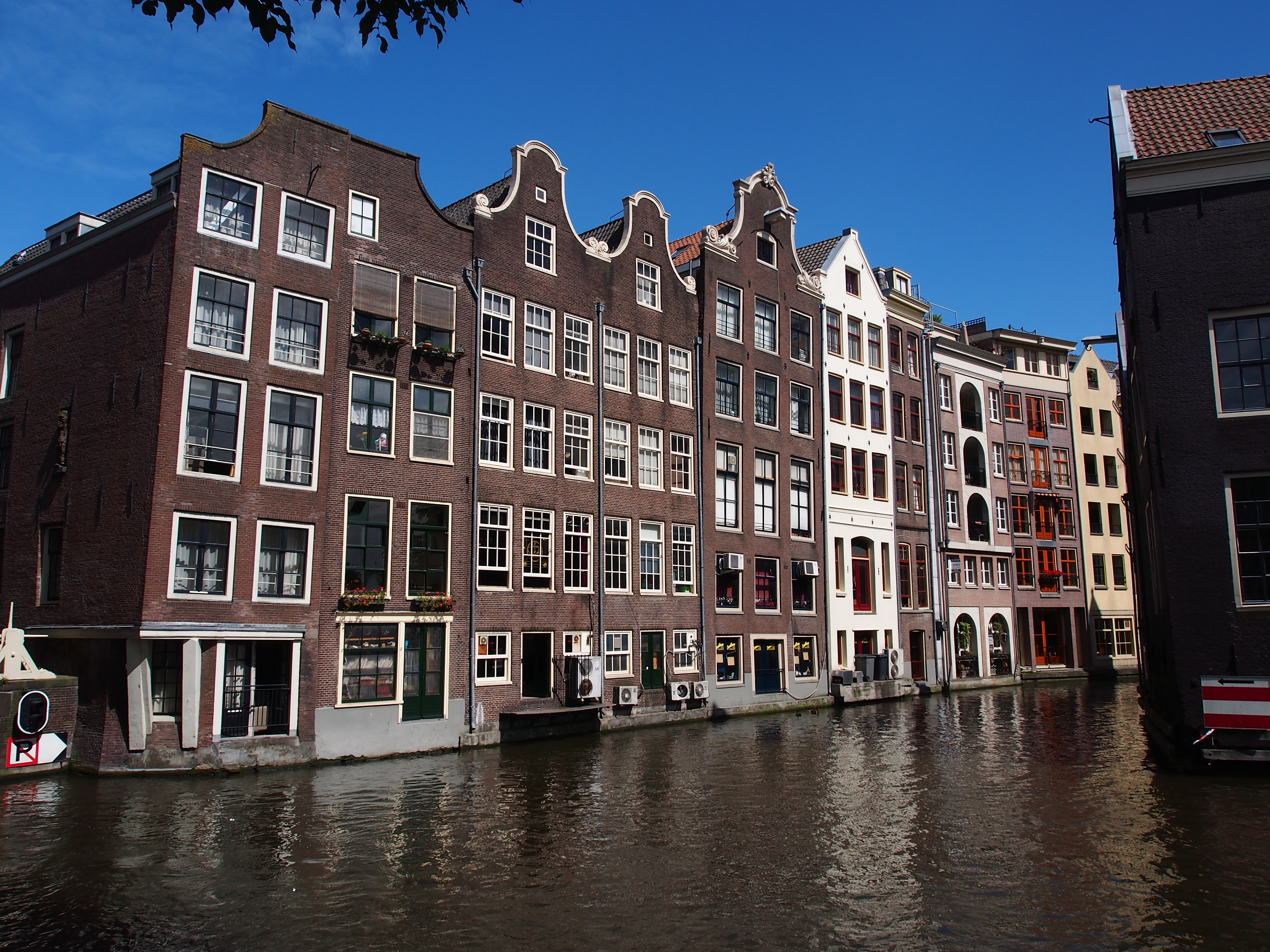
The houses to the east of the Oudezijds Kolk on the Zeedijk have their rear walls directly on the water of the Oudezijds Achterburgwal.

The Oudezijds Achterburgwal is part of the medieval city and once formed the eastern border of Amsterdam.

Until the end of the 14th century, the Amstel divided Amsterdam into two almost equal parts, the old side with the Old Church and the new side with the New Church. To protect the city, a moat was dug on each side with a burgwal behind it, an earthen wall, with a wooden palisade for protection. When new ramparts were constructed behind these ramparts around 1385, the existing rampart became the Voorburgwal and the new rampart became the Achterburgwal, both on the old and the new side. This is how Oudezijds Voorburgwal, Oudezijds Achterburgwal, Nieuwezijds Voorburgwal and Nieuwezijds Achterburgwal (now Spuistraat) were created. The Oudezijds Achterburgwal was dug in 1367. After a dyke breach in 1380, a new dyke was constructed behind the OZ Achterburgwal, the Sint Antoniesdijk (1387).

Before the Alteratie (Alteration) in 1578 there were many monasteries in this neighborhood. There were 16 women's monasteries and three male monasteries in Amsterdam, most of them on Oudezijds Achterburgwal. The names of many side streets of the Achterburgwal OZ still recall this past, such as the Bethaniënstraat and Monnikenstraat .

The Spinhuis, a women's prison for vagrants and beggars, was also on the OZ Achterburgwal.

The OZ Achterburgwal was refurbished in 2006 by the municipality of Amsterdam. The municipality announced in December 2007 that window prostitution in the Red Light District will be drastically reduced. Pub owner and landlord Charles Geerts was more or less forced to sell 51 of his "windows" on the OZ Achterburgwal to the municipality. From January 7, 2008, 15 fashion subjects can live and work in the vacant buildings for a year. There will be a store at OZ Achterburgwal 121 where their designs will be sold.

The number of windows on the OZ Achterburgwal will be further reduced in the context of the Project 1012 by purchasing more properties. The OZ Achterburgwal and side streets, however, is one of the few areas where window prostitution will not completely disappear.

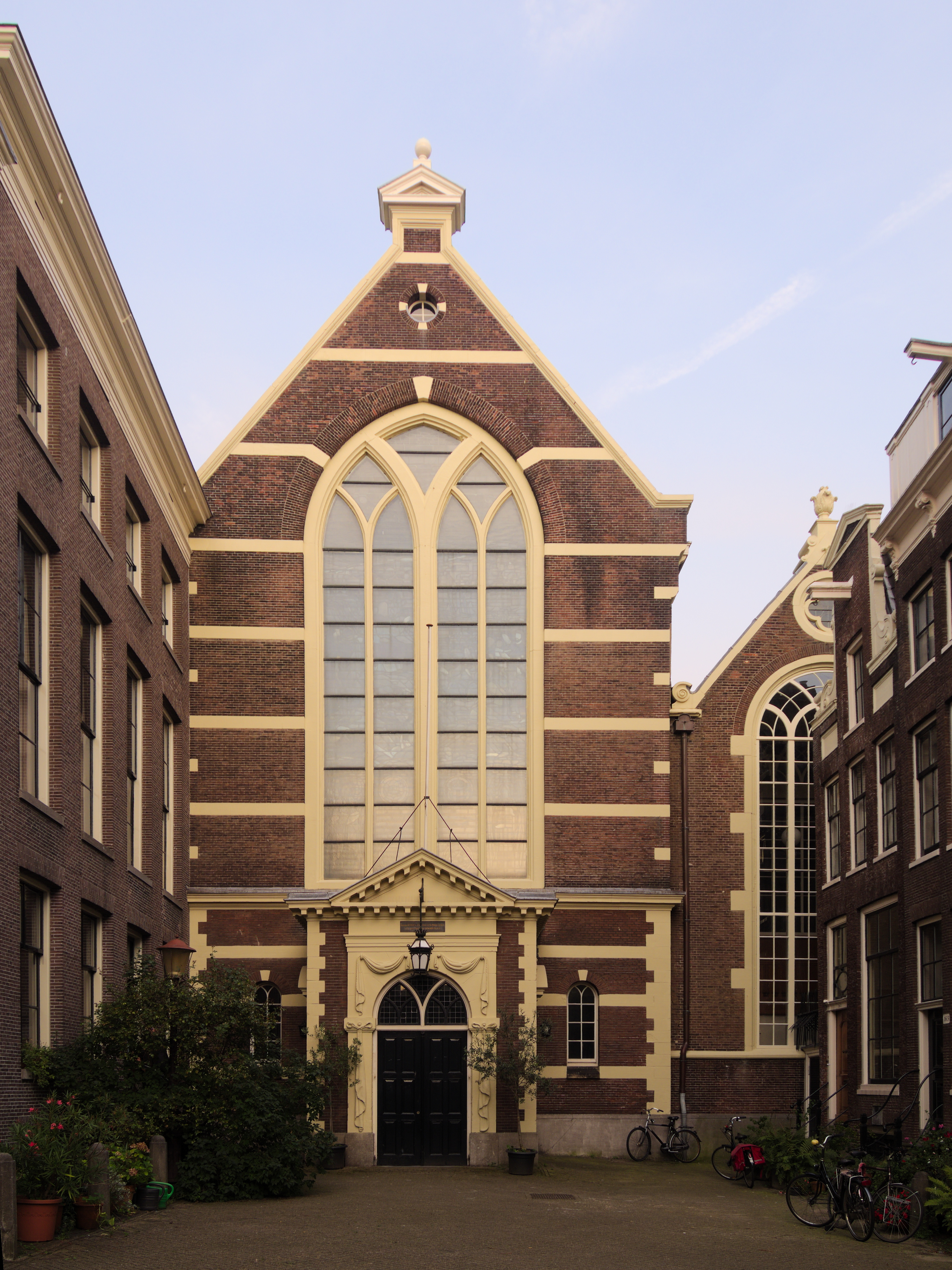
Walloon Church

== Notable buildings ==
Some well-known structures on the OZ Achterburgwal are:

- The Oudemanhuispoor, a covered passage between the OZ Achterburgwal and Kloveniersburgwal. A book market has been held in this for centuries . The Oudemanhuispoort complex is one of the main locations of the University of Amsterdam.
- The Walloon Church, originally the chapel of the Paulusbroedersklooster. This chapel, consecrated in 1496, replaced an earlier chapel that was probably destroyed in the town fire of 1452. The church is located on a small square, the Walenplein .
- De Gecroonde Raep, a canal house on the Oudezijds Voorburgwal with the rear house on the Oudezijds Achterburgwal (number 46A).

The OZ Achterburgwal has more than 100 national monuments, including monument 8, the building in which the Bananenbar is located.

== Bridges ==
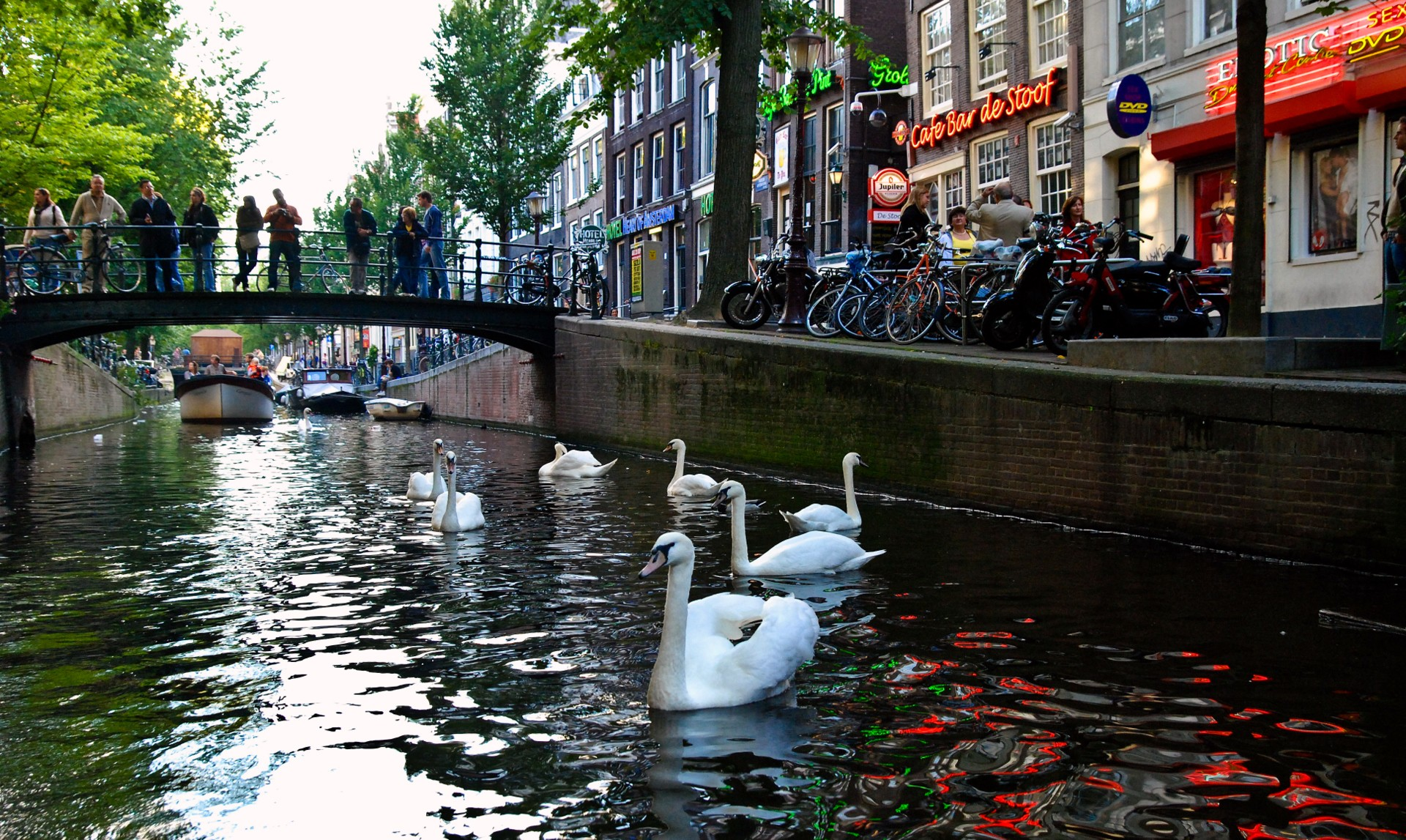
Swans on the canal

There are a number of bridges across Oudezijds Achterburgwal (from north to south):

bridge 209, the Vredenburger bridge, between Vredenburgersteeg and Spooksteeg
bridge 210, between Korte Niezel and Korte Stormsteeg
bridge 211, between Oudekennissteeg and Molensteeg
bridge 214, Stoofbrug, leads from Stoofsteeg over the canal
bridge 215, Paulusbroedersluis, between Oude Doelenstraat and Oude Hoogstraat
bridge 216, somewhat skewed bridge between Sint Agnietenstraat and Rusland
bridge 218, at the crossing with the Grimburgwal

From October 2015, an experimental bridge was started for this canal. The steel bridge was manufactured to a design by Joris Laarman from a 3D printer at a construction site on the NDSM wharf in Amsterdam-Noord. Work on the bridge started after the Amsterdam politician Kajsa Ollongren gave the go-ahead by cutting a ribbon. The bridge was supplied by a collaboration between Bouwbedrijf Heijmans NV and MX3D, a start-up company. At first it was thought that after a number of experiments the bridge could be printed on the spot, but that turned out to be a process that was not (yet) feasible. The insights had already partly changed in 2017, when it was hoped that the next bridge could be manufactured on site. The bridge was completed in 2021.

== See also ==
- Canals of Amsterdam
