= August Aimé Balkema =

Dutch publisher (1906–1996)

August Aimé (Guus) Balkema (6 October 1906, in Avereest – 4 September 1996, in Rotterdam), or A. A. Balkema, was a Dutch book trader and publisher active in Amsterdam and South Africa. He played a prominent role in the South African publishing world and was included in They shaped our century (1999), a list of the 100 most influential people in South Africa in the 20th century.

== Life and career ==
=== Early years ===
Balkema was born in Avereest in Overijssel, the son of Sijbrand Harkes Balkema and Antje Tjitske Gelderman. On 18 January 1936 in Zandvoort, he wed Anna Stehouwer.

=== Amsterdam ===
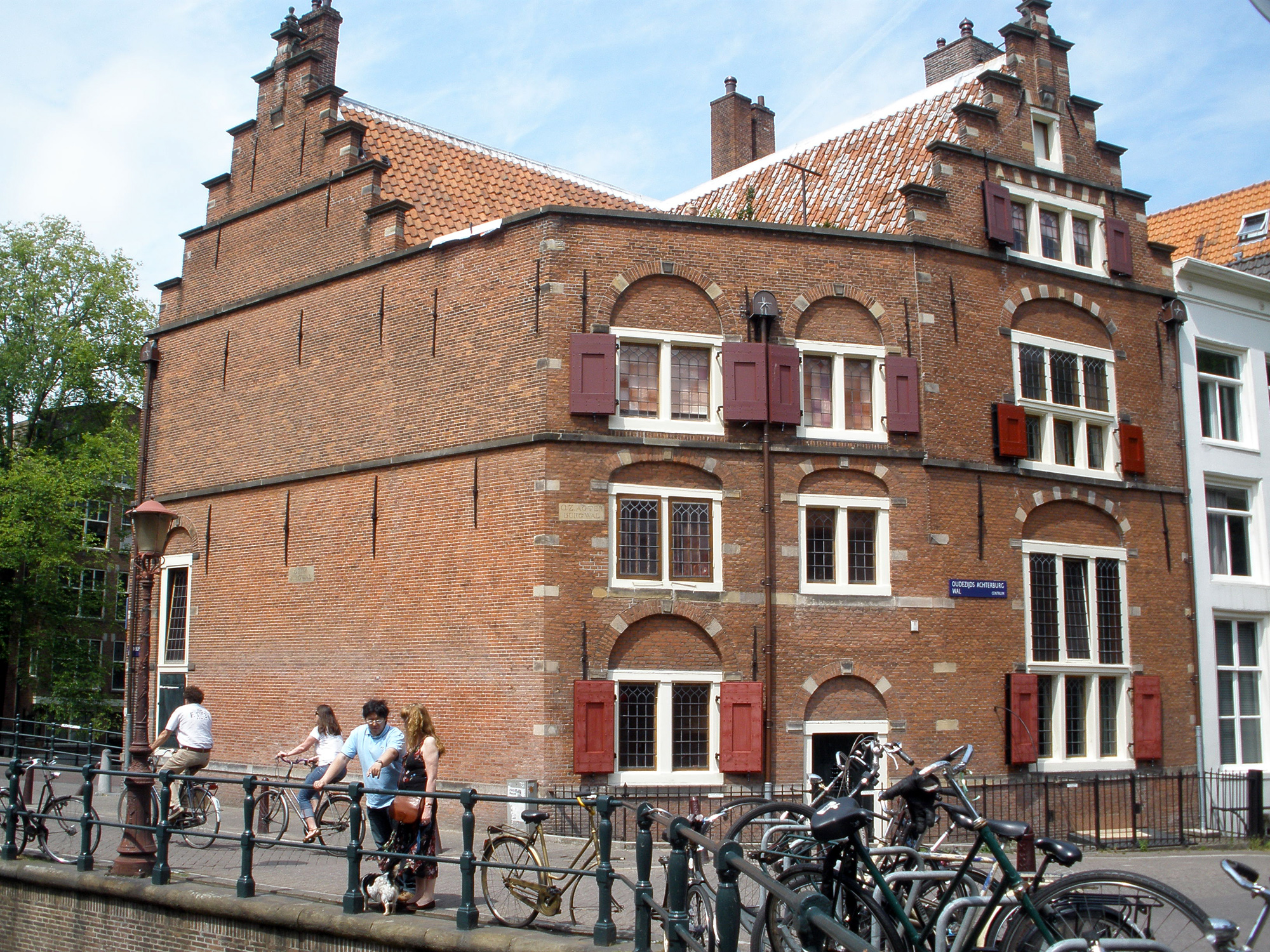
The Huis aan de Drie Grachten ('House on Three Canals') in Amsterdam

After studying French literature, in 1936 he opened a bookstore in the Huis aan de Drie Grachten ('House on Three Canals') in Amsterdam. During the Second World War, the bookstore was used to clandestinely print and publish works of poetry and other literature. In the series De Vijf Ponden Pers, which Balkema started in 1942, fifty works were published during the war, including works by Dutch poets like A. Roland Holst and Martinus Nijhoff as well as books in English and French, languages banned by the German occupiers. The prominent typographer Jan van Krimpen handled many of these publications. In 1945 Balkema published a catalogue of the series under the name Catalogus van vijftig boeken en boekjes zonder toestemming uitgeven in de jaren 1942−1945 ('Catalogue of fifty books published without permission in the years 1942−1945').

In 1943 Balkema, along with Adriaan Morriën en Fred Batten, started the series Het Zwarte Schaap. After the war, this series was taken over by the publishing house De Bezige Bij.

During renovations of the Huis aan de Drie Grachten in 2005, a hidden compartment was uncovered containing an archive of wartime documents, including manuscripts and correspondence. The compartment may also have served as a hiding place for (Jewish) onderduikers (people hiding from the Germans). The archive was donated in 2006 to the library of the Koninklijke Vereniging van het Boekenvak ('Royal Association of the Book Trade'), which is housed in the library of the University of Amsterdam.

=== South Africa ===
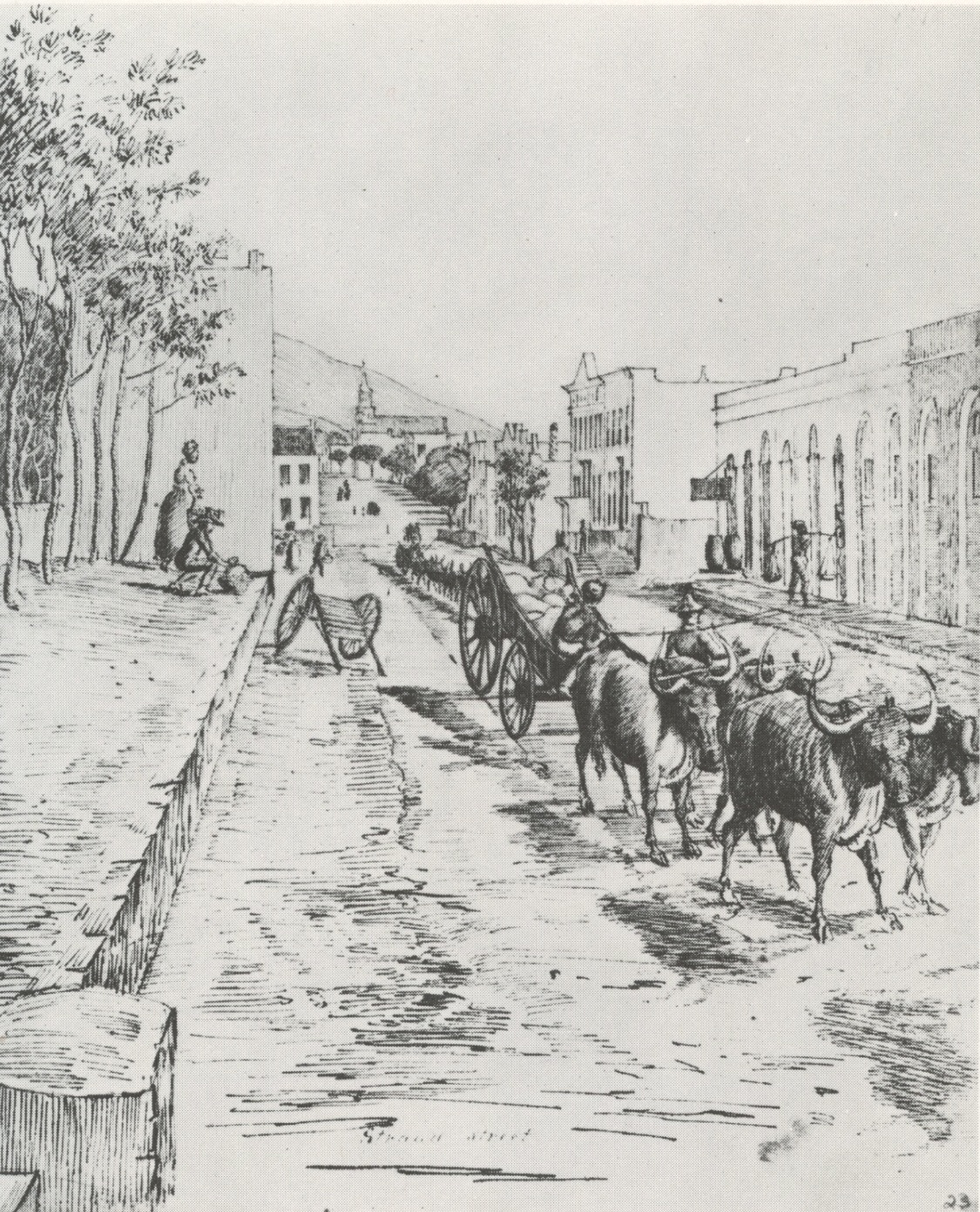
Pictorial Africana. Cape Town A.A. Balkema, 1975. Print

In 1946, after the end of the war, Balkema sold his bookstore in Amsterdam and left for South Africa to pursue a career as a publisher there. That same year, he published his first book in South Africa, Vyjtig Gedigte by the South African poet C. Louis Leipoldt.

Balkema quickly established his name by publishing specialist books which had often been refused by the more established publishing houses. These included such works as the Hertzog Prize-winning Die Vrou op die Skuit by Elise Muller (1957). Before long, many South African writers began to approach Balkema of their own accord to request that he publish their work. These included Jan Rabie whose Ons, die afgod was the first Afrikaans-language anti-apartheid novel, evoking much criticism and controversy when it was published in 1958. Balkema's status was definitely established when he was asked to handle the official publication of the Daghregisters (journals) of Jan van Riebeeck in 1952.

Balkema was known for the high quality of the books he published, in particular the typography and design. He was one of the first South African publishers to switch to an IBM typewriter for typesetting. He also introduced non-justified text to the country.

His perhaps greatest contribution was to Afrikaans-language nonfiction. A large number of books on South African nature, architecture, culture, and history were authored and published on his initiative, and are still considered standard works in their respective fields. He also published English-language literature and academic books and journals.

=== Later years ===
In the 1960s, Balkema decided to end his career as a publisher. During a visit to his family in the Netherlands in 1986, he fell severely ill. He and his wife Annie decided to re-settle in the Netherlands, where they remained until their deaths, hers in 1994 and his in 1996.

== Legacy ==
In 1984 a liber amicorum in his honour was published by Vriende van die S.A. Biblioteek, Liber amicorum pro A.A. Balkema.

Balkema was included in They shaped our century (1999), a list of the 100 most influential people in South Africa in the 20th century.

His son started a technical and scientific publisher in Rotterdam, naming it A A Balkema Publishers after his father. This imprint is now part of the Taylor & Francis Group as CRC Press / Balkema.

His son (also named A.A. Balkema) is a mathematician who proved, together with Laurens de Haan, the epynomous Pickands–Balkema–De Haan theorem.
