= Alteratie =

1578 political takeover in Amsterdam

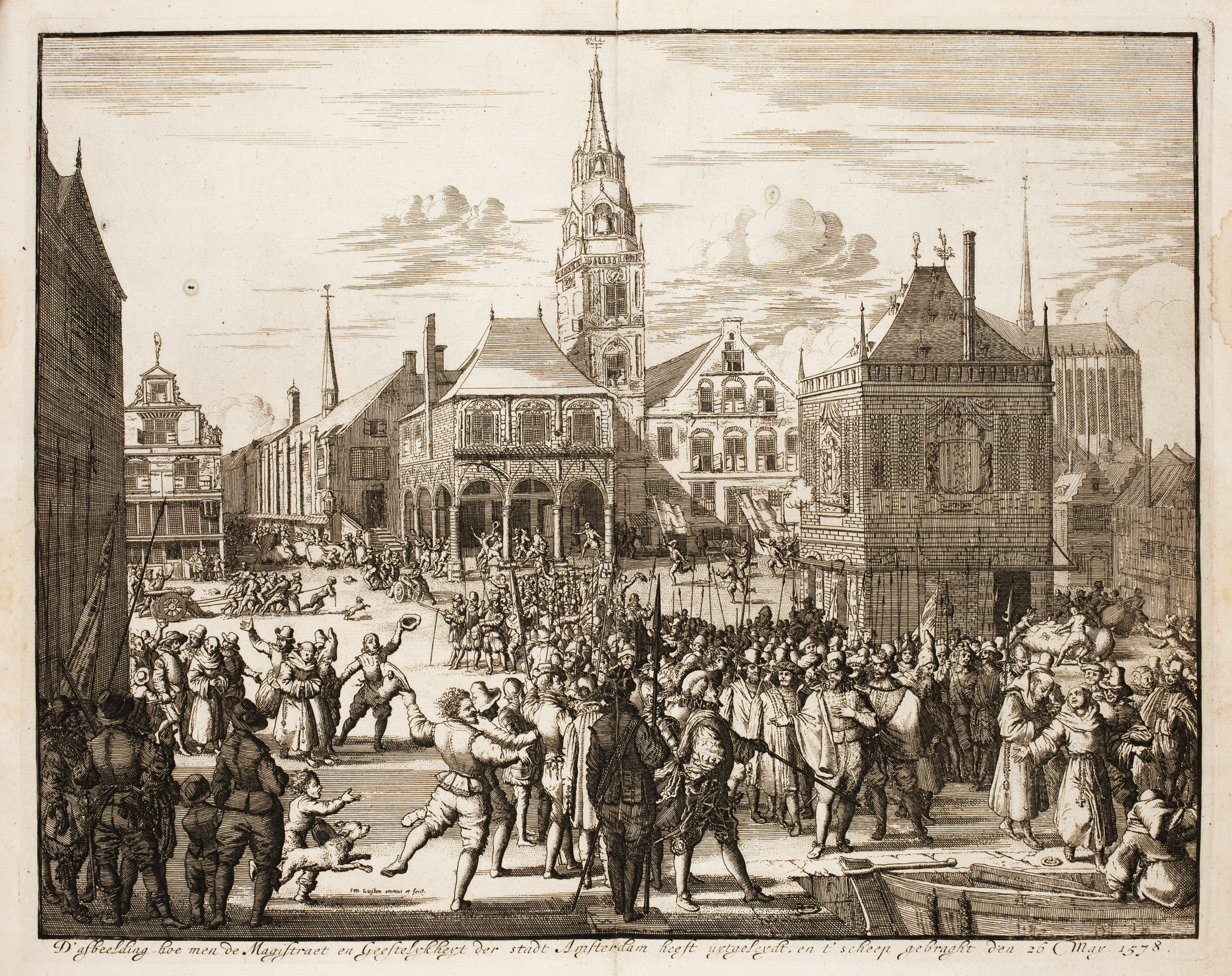
Alteratie of Amsterdam, in Pieter Corneliszoon Hooft and Geeraert Brandt: Nederlandsche historien.

The Alteratie (Eng: Alteration) is the name given to the change of power in Amsterdam on May 26, 1578, when the Catholic city government was deposed in favor of a Protestant one. The coup should be seen in the context of the greater Dutch Revolt that was breaking out in this time. Trade interests played an important role, because Amsterdam was becoming isolated as surrounding cities and towns joined the revolt, and other cities were threatening to take over its trade. No one was injured or killed during the coup. On May 29, a new city council was formed, consisting of 30 Calvinists and 10 Catholics. Already after a few months, plans were presented to expand the city and the harbor on the eastern side (Lastage), and to construct new defensive fortifications (Oude Schans).

== Conditions before the Alteratie ==
After the Pacification of Ghent in 1576, Amsterdam was forced to subject itself to the Prince of Orange and the States of Holland, but the city government wanted to stay loyal to King Philip II of Spain, and was opposed to adopting the Reformed church as the state religion. Only when the new regent John of Austria recognised the Pacification did Amsterdam follow his example. Lengthy negotiations followed about the Satisfactie (Eng: Satisfaction), a treaty that would put the city under the authority of the Prince of Orange and the States of Holland. After an incursion into the city by the Geuzen on November 23, 1577, the city government finally signed the treaty on February 8, 1578.

In 1578, Amsterdam was one of the most important cities that had not yet joined the Prince of Orange in his rebellion against King Philip II. The war was costly, and a number of cities threatened to defect to the side of the King. With the Satisfactie, Amsterdam joined the rest of the cities of Holland in joining the rebellion. Nonetheless, tensions increased when a conflict arose with the burgomasters of Amsterdam about the control over the schutterij. An important issue with all cities was the question of religious freedom: if at least one hundred Protestant families resided in a city, they had the right to gather for their own religious services. After a Hedge Preaching, the issue rapidly escalated.

== Rebellion ==
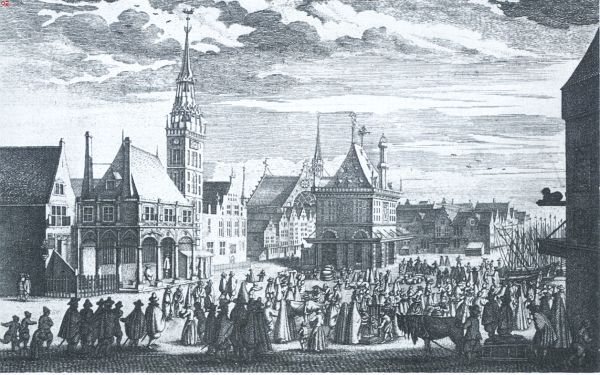
The old city hall on the Dam square in an engraving from the 17th century

A commission of old Geuzen and a large group of former exiled residents, many of whom owned land and warehouses on the Lastage, organised a gathering to plan their next move. The next day the Dam Square was closed off from the public. The catholic vroedschap (the city-council) was escorted to the Damrak, where barges had been prepared to take them out of Amsterdam. On May 26, 1578, 24 city-council members were forced to leave Amsterdam. They settled in Haarlem or Leiden or quietly returned later on.

The Franciscans, who were hated by the population, were also forced to leave. The remaining monks were allowed to remain in the city, and received a pension. The monks were rich and possessed much land; in some monasteries there were hardly any monks present.

== Consequences ==
As a result of the Alteratie, the parish-churches and chapels came into the hands of the Protestants, who renamed them. The oldest parish church of the city, the St. Nicolaschurch, was rechristened as the Oude Kerk, and the Heilige Stede became the Nieuwe Zijds Kapel. The New Church was taken over by the Calvinists after an iconoclastic movement in September. The large number of monasteries of the city came under the control of the new city-government, and were given new, non-religious purposes, such as orphanages or prisons. Valuable books were collected in the New Church.

Another consequence of the Alteratie was the reinforcement of the city walls.

== Sources ==
- Hooft, P.C. (1642) De Nederlandse Historiën in het kort. Dertiende boek, p. 236-42.
- Brugmans, H. (1972) De geschiedenis van Amsterdam. Deel 2: 80-jarige oorlog, p. 143-59.
- https://web.archive.org/web/20070710040344/http://gemeentearchief.amsterdam.nl/schatkamer/300_schatten/macht/willem_van_oranje/ (nl)
- (nl)
