= Mariska Majoor =

Former sex worker, activist and author in Amsterdam

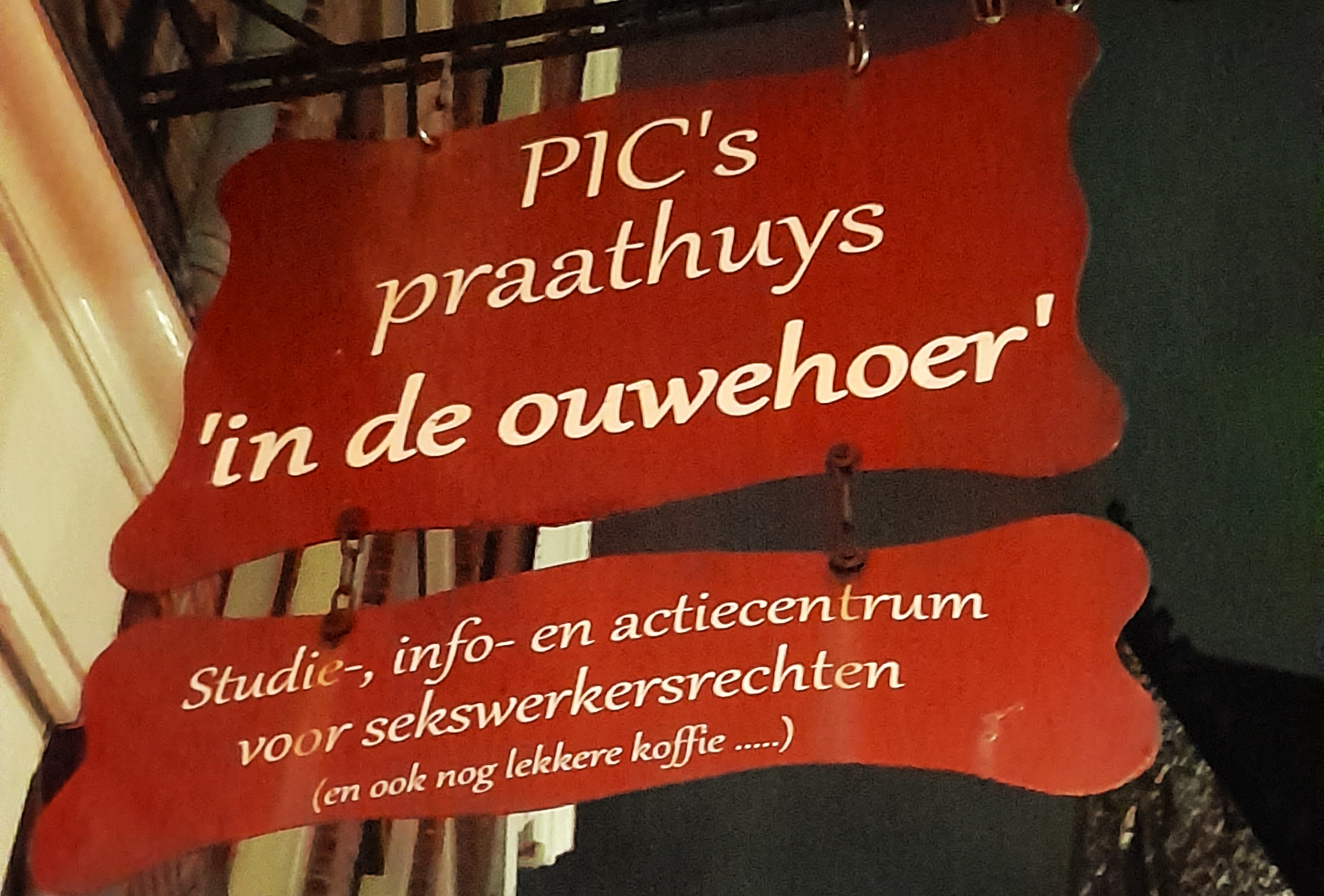
Majoor is best known for founding the Prostitution Information Center (PIC). Its sign reads: "Study, info and action centre for sex workers' rights (as well as nice coffee...)"

Mariska Majoor (Hilversum, 2 November 1968) is a Dutch writer, publicist, speaker, entrepreneur, and former sex worker. She founded the Prostitution Information Center (1994) and the labour union PROUD (2015) in Amsterdam to support (novice) sex workers and inform passers-by/tourists and the general public, answer questions and dispel misconceptions about everything involving sex work. Majoor gives lectures and presentations on sex work, and has written several books including Als sex werken wordt (1999; English When Sex Becomes Work, 2016), United Under a Red Umbrella: Sex Work Around the World (2018), and Amsterdam Red Light District: The future of our past (2023). In 2017, Mariska Majoor was knighted by the Mayor of Amsterdam in recognition of her contribution to sex workers' rights in the Netherlands.

== Biography ==
=== Sex worker ===
Mariska Majoor was born 2 November 1968 in Hilversum, and grew up in Laren, North Holland. By her own account, she had a protective Catholic upbringing in which she was absolutely not allowed to do certain things. As a 16-year-old, Majoor ran away from home and dropped out of school. She voluntarily chose a job as a sex worker a short while later. In hindsight, she had started "impulsively", for "a very idiotic reason" because she needed quick money for something, though she never regretted it. She said In 1994, she recounted that she had 'had an awful lot of fun, and also experienced some very unpleasant things', especially regarding social stigma and poor working conditions because it was still an illegal profession. Yet, she did think her best time was when she was behind the window and later worked in a private house because it was 'very exciting': 'You're having fun with your colleagues, which is very personal. You've got a certain sense of power when you're almost in your bare arse behind a window and the whole world can see you. (...) It's hard to explain.' When she decided to quit, she couldn't really find other work she liked: 'I did all sorts of shitty jobs: cleaning, making coffee. But working for a boss, with my big smart mouth, was not for me.'

After five years, she combined her plans for her own business with her knowledge and experience about sex work. From 1992, she published the bilingual English-Dutch magazine Pleasure Guide: informatief magazine over het betaalde liefdesleven ("informative magazine on the paid love life"), about which she was interviewed by NRC Handelsblad in August of that year. The first print run was 20,000 copies, and the issues distributed in Amsterdam sold out within two weeks. Majoor wanted to bring prostitution 'out of that eternal corner of damnation', inform clients and tourists about prevailing morals and legislation, and give clients practical advice on what can and cannot be done: 'I know how client and prostitute interact with each other, and it could be much better. Something had to be done about that.' She also noted that due to women's emancipation, more and more prostitutes were becoming self-employed rather than (still) seeking employment contracts with brothel operators: 'Women began making their own choices, and so did prostitutes. They became independent entrepreneurs.' Initially, the Pleasure Guide still depended on advertising revenue, which is why Majoor initially did not write about clubs that she found worthy of certain criticisms; critical articles were to be published once the magazine was taken seriously.

=== Prostitution Information Center ===
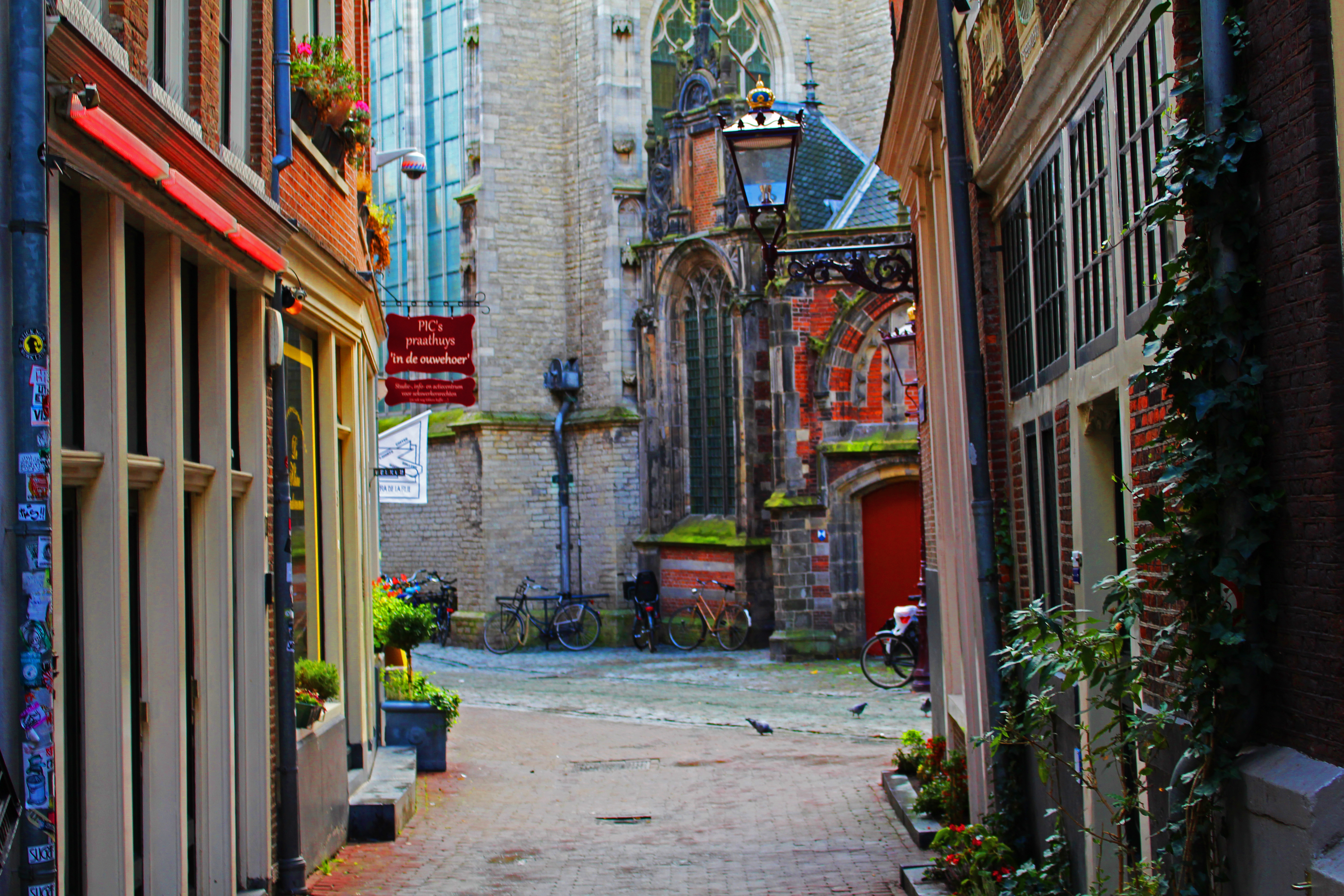
Enge Kerksteeg and the Old Church in Amsterdam, with Mariska Majoor's Prostitution Information Center (PIC) Praathuys 'in de ouwehoer' in the corner

In August 1994, Majoor founded the Prostitution Information Center in the De Wallen, Amsterdam's red-light district. In late January 1995, Majoor launched the first training course in the Netherlands for both women and men who wanted to become prostitutes, or were working in the sex trade already and wanted to learn more. Majoor told Trouw about the course: 'I'm launching this because so often in the trade you hear people say that prostitution is a real profession (...); well, then there should be an educational programme for it as well. Because there are plenty of things to learn about.' For 250 guilders, participants received explanations from Majoor, other (former) sex workers, sexologists and other experts on the history of prostitution, what types of sex work there are, health, money matters and personal well-being in six half-days spread over six weeks. With each trainee, Majoor first conducted an intake interview to ask why she or he wanted to do sex work and whether it was a good reason or not; besides earning money, the person must also like the job. She found it important to make a conscious choice for the profession and not end up there from a problematic situation, such as debts or drug addiction. On 9 July 1995, Majoor took the initiative to allow 16 male sex workers to work behind windows in the red-light district as an experiment. There were both positive and negative responses to the initiative; however, because it attracted so many camera crews and created a fuss among female sex workers in nearby premises, the experiment had to be suspended prematurely.

Over the years, the PIC has simultaneously functioned as an information desk, red-light district shop (including sex toys, books and pamphlets by Majoor on sex work-related frequently asked questions), library, mini-museum and art gallery. Majoor spoke to the press there, answered questions from passers-by, and gave tours of the red-light district. Because a sex worker from The Hague had come to her asking for more information in book form, which, however, was not available, she herself wrote the handbook Als sex werken wordt (When Sex Becomes Work) in 1999, with handy tips and checklists such as 'When is your boyfriend starting to look like a pimp' and '10 reasons to do/don't do it'.

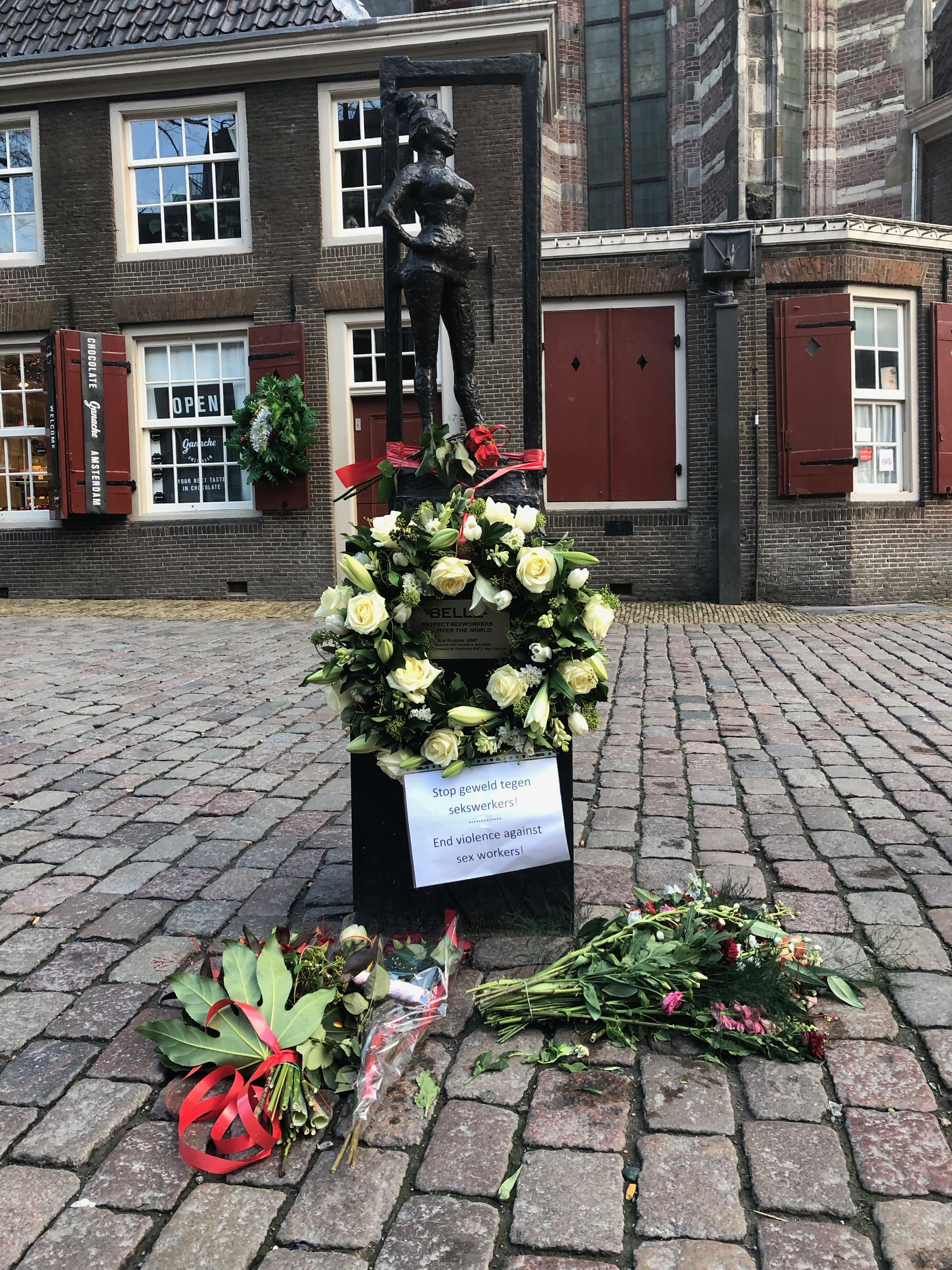
Belle statue. The wreath was laid on the occasion of the International Day to End Violence Against Sex Workers (annually on 17 December, here pictured in 2018).

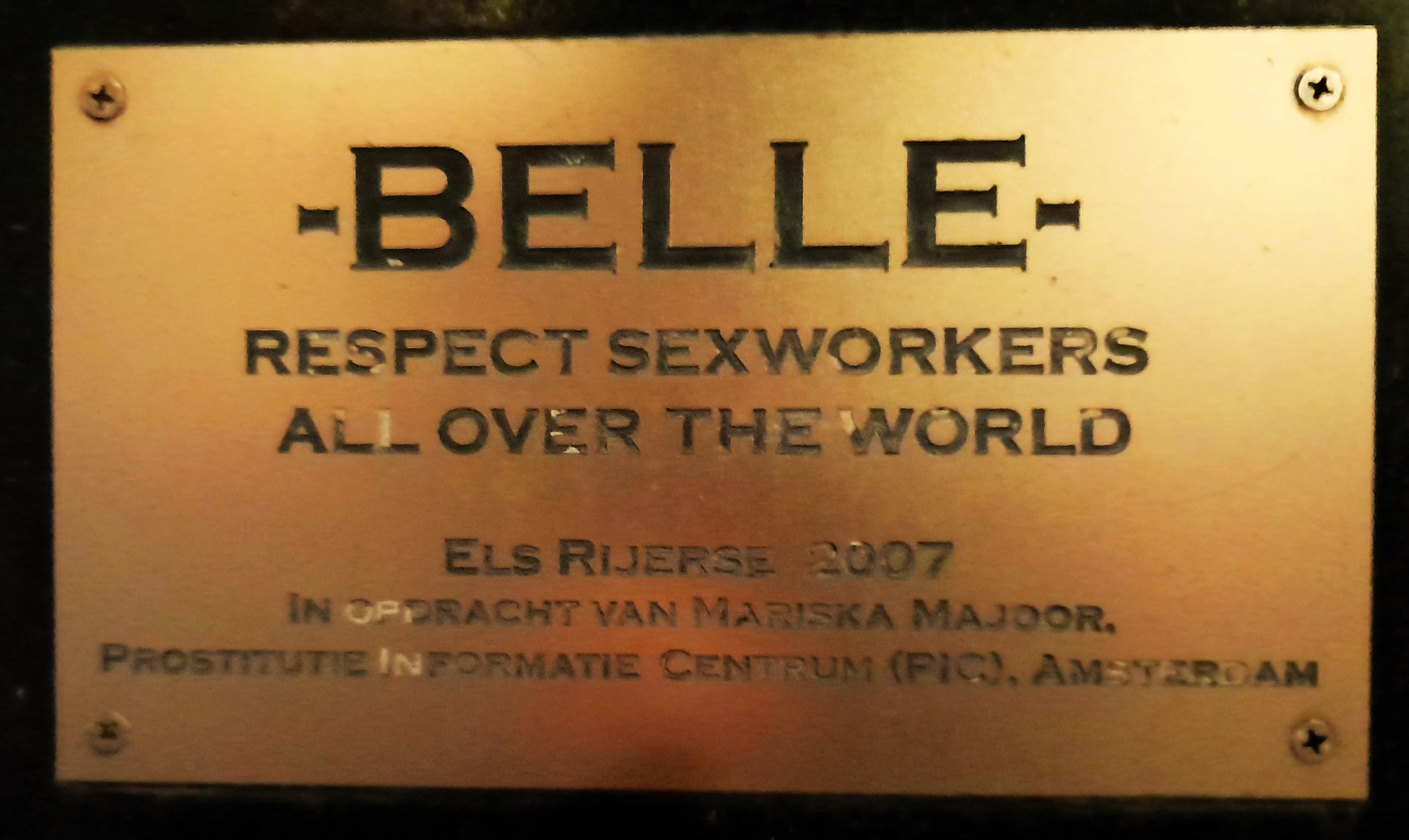
Plaque on Belle: "Respect sexworkers all over the world, Els Rijerse 2007, commissioned by Mariska Majoor, Prostitution Information Center (PIC), Amsterdam".

Majoor supported the abolition of the Dutch brothel ban in 2000 and considered it "a logical step" towards the decriminalisation of sex work. But she was sceptical about how it was being implemented: 'The government and brothel owners proclaim so easily that regulation is for the benefit of prostitutes, but if you look in practice, they have other priorities.' She pointed out that sex workers had been paying taxes since the 1950s, but that this was only now being formalised, there was a sudden crackdown on any form of prostitution that had not yet been legalised (with the aim of combating human trafficking, which everyone agreed with in principle, but not the means by which it was being implemented) and the new policy seemed to be enforced rather arbitrarily. Regardless, Majoor wrote a new tax leaflet for sex workers who wanted to follow the new legislation but did not know how.

After the brothel ban was lifted in 2000, the government stopped subsidising several organisations working for the interests of sex workers, including the Mr. A. de Graafstichting (1960–2005) and foundation The Red Thread (De Rode Draad), who ran into financial difficulties as a result. In December 2005, Majoor appeared on television channel Netherlands 3 in the talk show Woestijnruiters (precursor to Pauw & Witteman), where she got into a discussion with Karina Schaapman, another former sex worker who – unlike Majoor – had since turned against the trade.

An open day has been held in De Wallen red-light district several times since 2006. At the open day of 31 March 2007, for the second time at the initiative of Mariska Majoor, male prostitutes were behind the windows to have sex with either women or men in exchange for payment. The same day, on her initiative, a bronze statue called Belle by artist Els Rijerse was also unveiled on the Oudekerksplein as a tribute to sex workers. However, in 2007, the Amsterdam mayor's office (Note: Municipal executive, Dutch: college van burgemeester en wethouders. See Government of Amsterdam for more information.)) launched a campaign called Platform 1012, which aimed to buy out some window brothels and replace them with fashion and art shops. Following criticism of promotion of De Wallen red-light district on the government's tourism website, those web pages were removed, and in 2008 the mayor's office promised to remove all window prostitution and Majoor's Prostitution Information Center around the Oude Kerk. However, because the mayor's office systematically referred to the entire neighbourhood and all businesses located there as "criminal" or "criminogenic", the approach backfired and the affected window operators, coffee shop owners and other neighbourhood entrepreneurs jointly turned against it.

In 2012, the well-known Dutch sex workers foundation The Red Thread (De Rode Draad) went bankrupt. In response, Majoor founded the new sex workers' association PROUD as its successor in 2015. Sekswerk Nederland (SWN, "Sex Work Netherlands", active 2014–2015), a research organisation by and for sex workers founded by Yvette Luhrs, began cooperating with PROUD, and later merged into it (Luhrs later succeeded Majoor as its president). As president of PROUD, Majoor spearheaded a major demonstration of hundreds of sex workers on 9 April 2015, protesting against the plans of the Amsterdam mayor's office to close dozens of windows in De Wallen red-light district, without consulting the sex workers involved. She told the Associated Press: 'They [=the mayor's office of Amsterdam] say that they want to have more control over the sex industry because it is related often to human trafficking and abuse, but in our opinion they use that as an excuse only for the gentrification project.'

=== Further work and activism ===
In 2016, Majoor was diagnosed with lymphoma, forcing her to make the difficult decision to leave the red-light district after more than 30 years. In April 2017, she was honoured by the mayor of Amsterdam as a knight in the Order of Orange-Nassau for her many years of providing information on prostitution and advocacy for sex workers. In the meantime, however, she had already set up a new company called Koekje uit Amsterdam ("Biscuit from Amsterdam"), personally delivering boxes of biscuits by bike to catering businesses across Amsterdam. It was not very successful initially, partly because Majoor was not doing well physically, and she had to undergo many medical examinations.

In autumn 2017, Majoor and her daughter Robin made 13 trips to countries around the world to meet sex workers and collect their stories, which they compiled in United Under A Red Umbrella: Sex work around the world (2018), for which Robin did the photography. In the book, they describe major differences between how sex work is viewed around the world (with varying degrees of stigma), in what situations the work takes place and how safe it is, but the interviewees (including male sex workers, who, according to Majoor, have to fight "doubly" for acceptance) were keen to "talk to someone who comes from the profession themselves. This struggle creates solidarity.' Majoor was then also diagnosed with stomach cancer in late 2018, forcing her to undergo tougher treatments, and Robin cycled around the city delivering the orders whenever her mother was too ill.

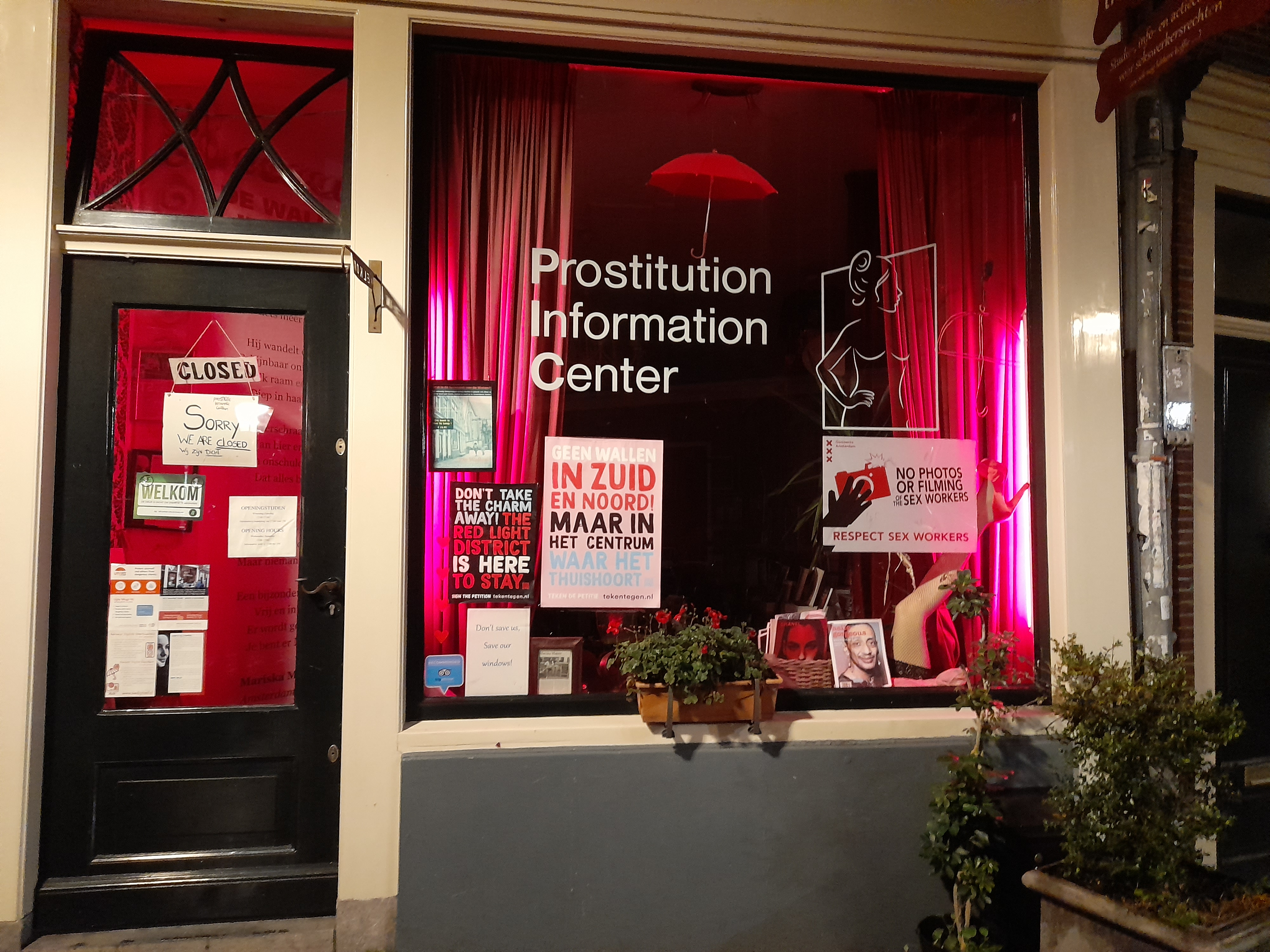
The Prostitution Information Center (PIC) as of 2023

When the horeca shut down in 2020 due to the COVID-19 pandemic, and Koekje uit Amsterdam was stuck without customers, Majoor donated many boxes to shelters for the homeless, which she had already been in solidarity with for years. After the pandemic, her biscuit business flourished and became a supplier to several prominent Amsterdam hotel and catering companies. In October 2023, Majoor initiated a protest march against the Amsterdam municipality's plans to relocate window brothels to an erotic centre; she handed the mayor the Manifesto for the Preservation of the Amsterdam Wallen.

== Works ==
=== Magazines ===
- Pleasure Guide: informatief magazine over het betaalde liefdesleven (from 1992). English/Dutch. Information and education for tourists and customers.
- De Rode Lantaarn (from 2005). Magazine for the sex trade.

=== Books ===
- Als sex werken wordt (1999). Later editions: Als seks werken wordt: Alles wat iedereen zou moeten weten over sekswerk.
  - English-language edition: When Sex Becomes Work (2016).
- 10 jaar PIC: een overzicht. Prostitutie Informatie Centrum 1994–2004. (2004)
- (with co-author Robin Haurissa) United Under A Red Umbrella: Sex work around the world (2018).
- De Wallen: toekomst van ons verleden (2020).
  - English-language edition: Amsterdam Red Light District: The future of our past (2023).

== Literature ==
- Kok, Zamarra (2006). Amsterdam Onder Vriendinnen. Amsterdam: Lannoo Uitgeverij. p. 55. ISBN 9789020966671.
- Mattson, Greggor (2016). The Cultural Politics of European Prostitution Reform: Governing Loose Women. London: Palgrave McMillan. p. 247. ISBN 9781137517173.
