= Majoor =

Majoor is a Dutch surname. Notable people with the surname include:

- Frank Majoor (born 1949), Dutch diplomat
- Martin Majoor (born 1960), Dutch typographer
- Mariska Majoor (born 1968), Former sex worker, activist and author in Amsterdam
