= Casa Rosso =

Sex theatre in Amsterdam Netherlands

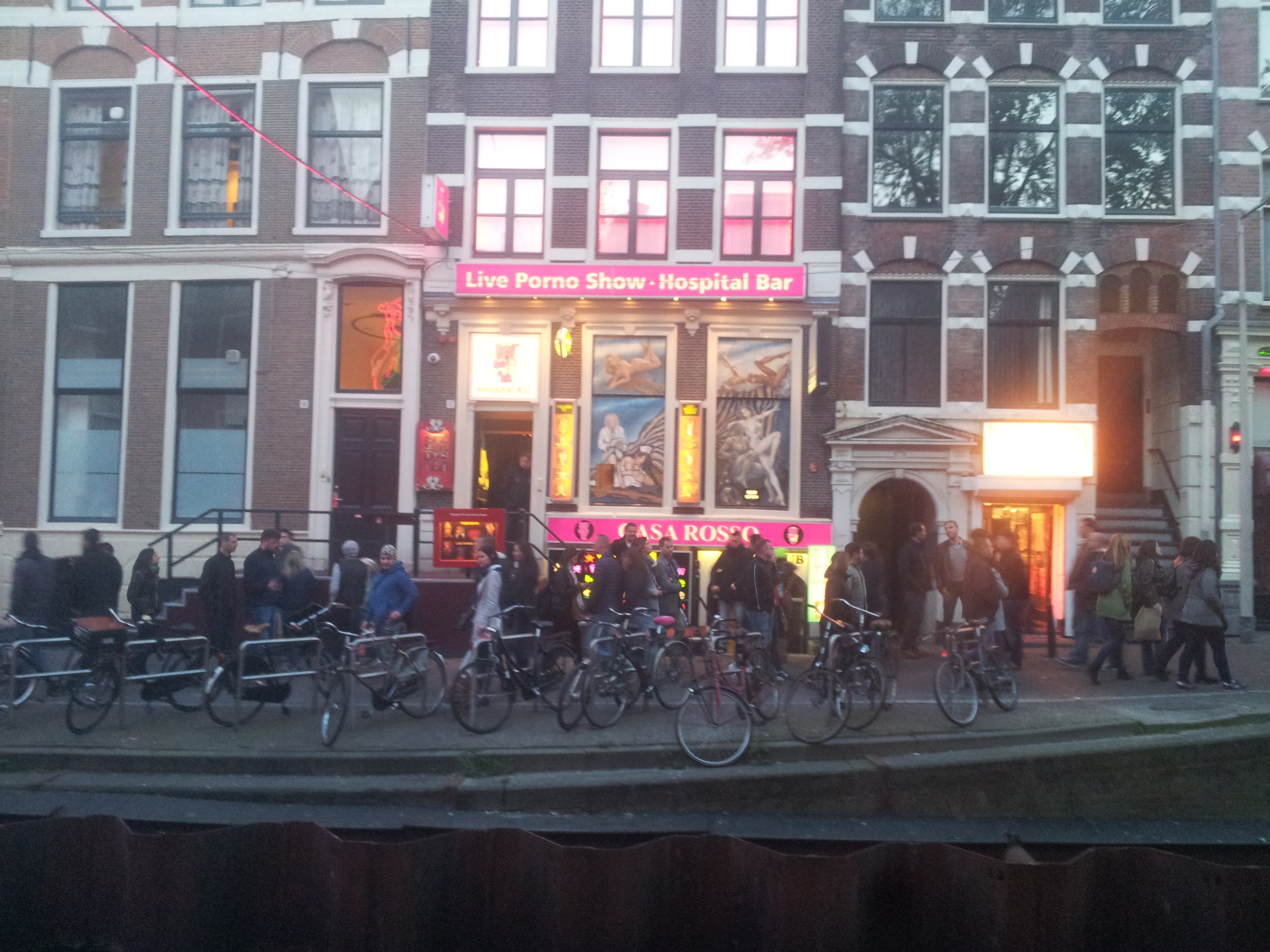

Casa Rosso is an erotic theatre located in De Wallen, the red-light district of Amsterdam, Netherlands. Opened in 1968, it is widely considered the world's first theatre to present live sex shows on stage and has become an iconic landmark of Amsterdam's adult entertainment industry.

== History ==
=== Founding and early years ===
Casa Rosso was founded in 1969 by Joop de Vries, a businessman known locally as "Joden Jopie" (Jewish Jopie) or "Zwarte Joop" (Black Joop), who had previously operated the jazz club Casablanca on the Zeedijk. The theatre quickly gained international notoriety as a pioneer in live erotic entertainment.

=== 1983 fire ===
On the night of 16–17 December 1983, Casa Rosso was devastated by an arson attack that killed 13 people and injured at least 25 others. The fire was started by Joseph Lan, a former employee who had been dismissed approximately two months earlier. Lan entered the building with a jerrycan of gasoline, which he sprinkled in the foyer and on the stairs before igniting it with gunshots. The blaze spread rapidly to two adjoining establishments, and all three venues were crowded at the time. More than 70 firefighters using 20 vehicles and a fireboat worked for over five hours to control the fire. All 13 victims died from smoke inhalation. Lan was arrested while attempting to flee the city and was subsequently convicted.

=== Ownership changes ===
In 1996, the theatre was sold to Kobloei Beheer, a company owned by Charles Geerts, a prominent figure in the red-light district. In early 1997, Geerts sold the business to Jan Otten, who had begun his career at Casa Rosso as a doorman in the 1980s. Otten became known as the "King of the Red Light District" and expanded his holdings to include several other establishments in De Wallen, including the Bananenbar, Hospitalbar, the Erotic Museum, Sex Palace Peepshow, and Theatre 97.

The sale to Otten prompted a BIBOB investigation by Amsterdam authorities, examining potential connections to money laundering. While the investigation took long, all suspicions were refuted, and financial transparency of the theater has increased ever since. In 2017, two masked men attempted to rob Otten in Amsterdam-Noord, resulting in his security guard being shot. Jan Otten died on 23 May 2024, at the age of 82.

== Threat of closure and modernisation ==
Around 2007–2008, Casa Rosso faced potential closure as part of Amsterdam's Project 1012, an urban renewal initiative aimed at reducing criminal activity and improving the quality of businesses in the red-light district. The project, named after the area's postal code, sought to replace sex-oriented businesses with upscale shops, restaurants, and galleries. However, authorities ultimately allowed Casa Rosso to continue operating.

Under Otten's management, the theatre modernised its operations and worked to distance itself from the area's historic associations with organised crime. The venue implemented stricter compliance measures and positioned itself as a legitimate tourist attraction rather than an underground establishment.

== The venue ==
Casa Rosso is located at Oudezijds Achterburgwal 106–108, in the heart of De Wallen. The theatre features approximately 180 seats arranged around a central stage, a full bar, a balcony section, and a lounge area furnished with red velvet seating. The venue's logo—a pink elephant wearing a green scarf—is displayed life-size on the building's exterior and has become a recognisable symbol in the Amsterdam streetscape.

== Neighbourhood influence ==
Casa Rosso has played a significant role in shaping the identity of De Wallen. As one of the largest and longest-operating erotic theatres in the district, it has served as both a tourist attraction and a lightning rod for debates about prostitution, urban renewal, and gentrification in Amsterdam.

During the Project 1012 era (2007–2018), the municipality closed approximately 130 brothels and 100 window prostitution locations in an effort to combat organised crime and diversify the neighbourhood's economy. Casa Rosso was among the businesses that survived this transformation, in part by adapting to new regulations and attracting a more mainstream clientele including tourists, business groups, and bachelor parties. Critics of Project 1012 argued that the initiative displaced sex workers into less safe working conditions while erasing the historic character of the neighbourhood. Supporters countered that the changes made De Wallen safer and more accessible to ordinary residents and visitors.

== See also ==
- De Wallen
- Prostitution in the Netherlands
- Red-Light district
