= Prostitution Information Center =

Resource for visitors to Amsterdam

Coordinates: 52.37475°N 4.89778°E

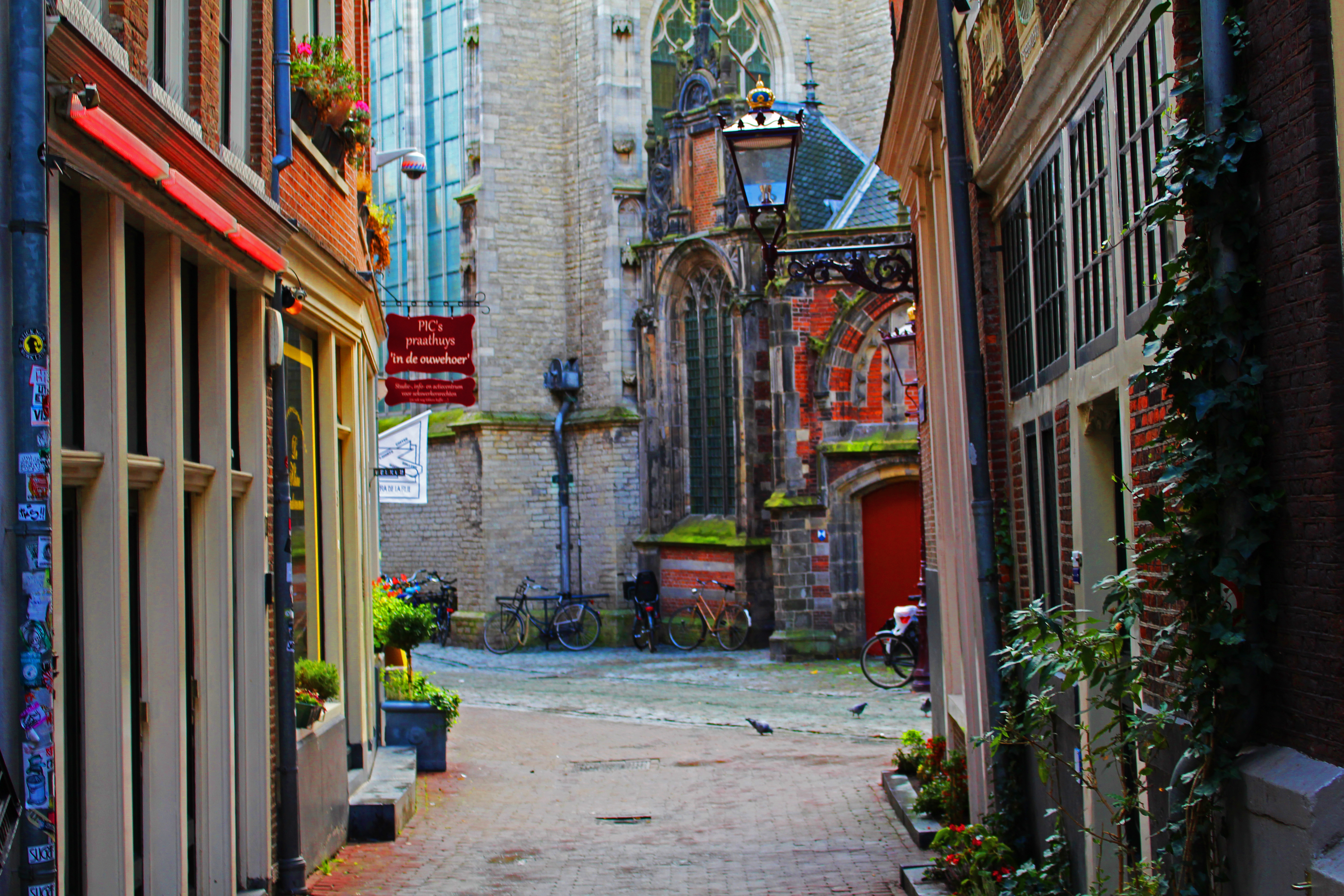
Enge Kerksteeg and the Old Church in Amsterdam, with Mariska Majoor's Prostitution Information Center (PIC) with the Praathuys 'in de ouwehoer' in the corner

The Prostitution Information Center (PIC, Dutch: Prostitutie Informatie Centrum) is located in the heart of Amsterdam in the red light district, near Amsterdam's Old Church. The PIC serves as an educational centre and resource for providing Amsterdam's visitors with information and advice about prostitution.

The practice of prostitution in the Netherlands was legalised nationally in October 2000. However, Amsterdam has long had a tolerant attitude towards prostitution, coupled with clear regulations that have been in force for many decades. Though prostitution is legal in Amsterdam, there is still a considerable amount of misunderstanding about it. The PIC's objective is to clear up some of that misunderstanding by providing visitors with accurate information regarding prostitution.

== Founding ==
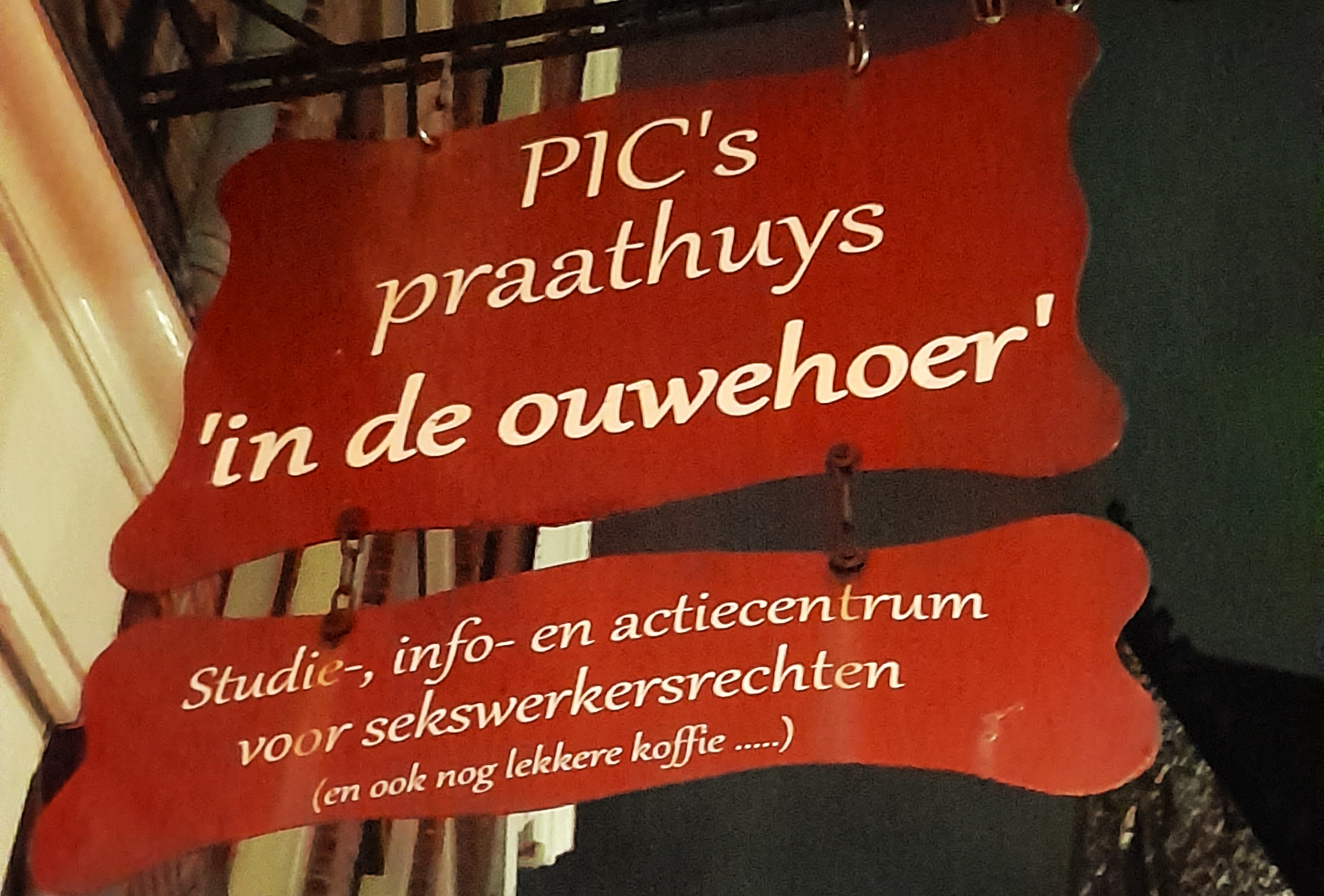
PIC sign: "Study, info and action centre for sex workers' rights (as well as nice coffee...)"

The PIC was founded in August 1994 by former prostitute Mariska Majoor. Majoor worked as prostitute from the age of 16 to 21, and quit, in her words, “because I feel different now about sex and relationships than a couple of years ago…but there are plenty of people, who like me, have made a well considered choice to work in prostitution, and they deserve our respect.”

She founded the PIC to inform the uneducated about prostitution. The PIC's purpose is to offer a freely accessible place where people who have questions about prostitution can get answers to almost any prostitution-related question, or can be referred to other knowledgeable organizations if necessary. Majoor strongly believes that prostitution is a profession that all countries should legalise. She has said, “Every country should legalise prostitution; it’s part of society. In our eyes it’s a profession, a way of making money; it’s important that we are realistic about this. Most people think legalising is approval but it can be a way to deal with it, to organise it and make it safer. Prostitution is not bad; it’s only bad if done against one’s will. Most women make this decision themselves.”

== Activities ==
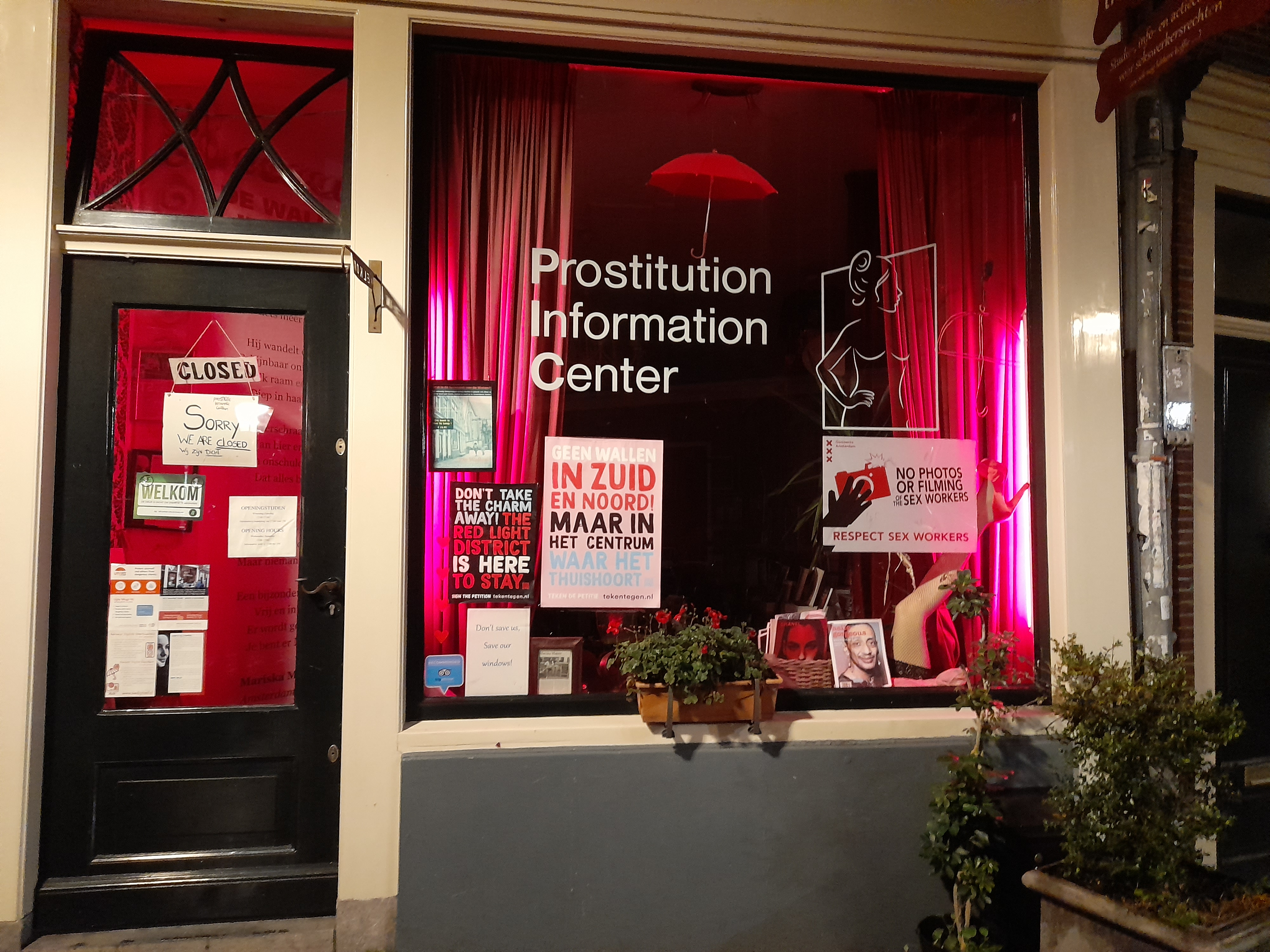
The Prostitution Information Center (PIC) in Amsterdam (2023)

Over the years, the PIC has simultaneously functioned as an information desk, Red Light District Shop (including sex toys, books and pamphlets by Majoor on sex work-related frequently asked questions), library, mini-museum and art gallery. Major spoke to the press there, answered questions from passers-by and gave tours of the red light district. Because a sex worker from The Hague had come to her asking for more information in book form, which, however, was not available, she herself wrote the handbook When sex becomes work in 1999, with useful tips and checklists such as 'When does your boyfriend start looking like a pimp', and '10 reasons to do/don't do it.'

By 2007, the PIC was run by Majoor and other former prostitutes, providing information to around 22,000 visitors a year. Visitors to the PIC can also find books about the red light district and sex works written in both Dutch and English. The PIC conducts lectures and slide presentations on prostitution and other sex-work related issues. Staff members of the PIC will also take interested visitors on a walking tour of the red light district.

The PIC operates as a charitable foundation. It receives no government subsidies and has only survived over the years with great difficulty. However, the objectives of the PIC have been proven to be of importance to sex workers, their clients, Amsterdam residents, and visitors to the area alike. Without any financial support the PIC was struggling to operate, but it claims to have played a valuable role and needed to find a way to survive. So in January 2004, the PIC's activities merged with those of De Wallenwinkel, or the Red Light District Store. The Wallenwinkel, located next to the PIC, now operates as the PIC shop and provides the main source of financial support for the Prostitution Information Center.

== Bibliography ==
- Kok, Zamarra (2006). Amsterdam Onder Vriendinnen (in Dutch). Amsterdam: Lannoo Uitgeverij. p. 55. ISBN 9789020966671.
- Mattson, Greggor (2016). The Cultural Politics of European Prostitution Reform: Governing Loose Women. Londen: Palgrave McMillan. p. 247. ISBN 9781137517173.
