= De Onbekende Beeldhouwer =

Anonymous Dutch sculptor

De Onbekende Beeldhouwer (the Anonymous Sculptor) is an artist or group of artists known for work on street sculptures in Amsterdam through the 1980s and 1990s. At least eight works that attracted public interest have been so attributed, including "The Violinist" (1991), which can be seen at the Stopera in Amsterdam.

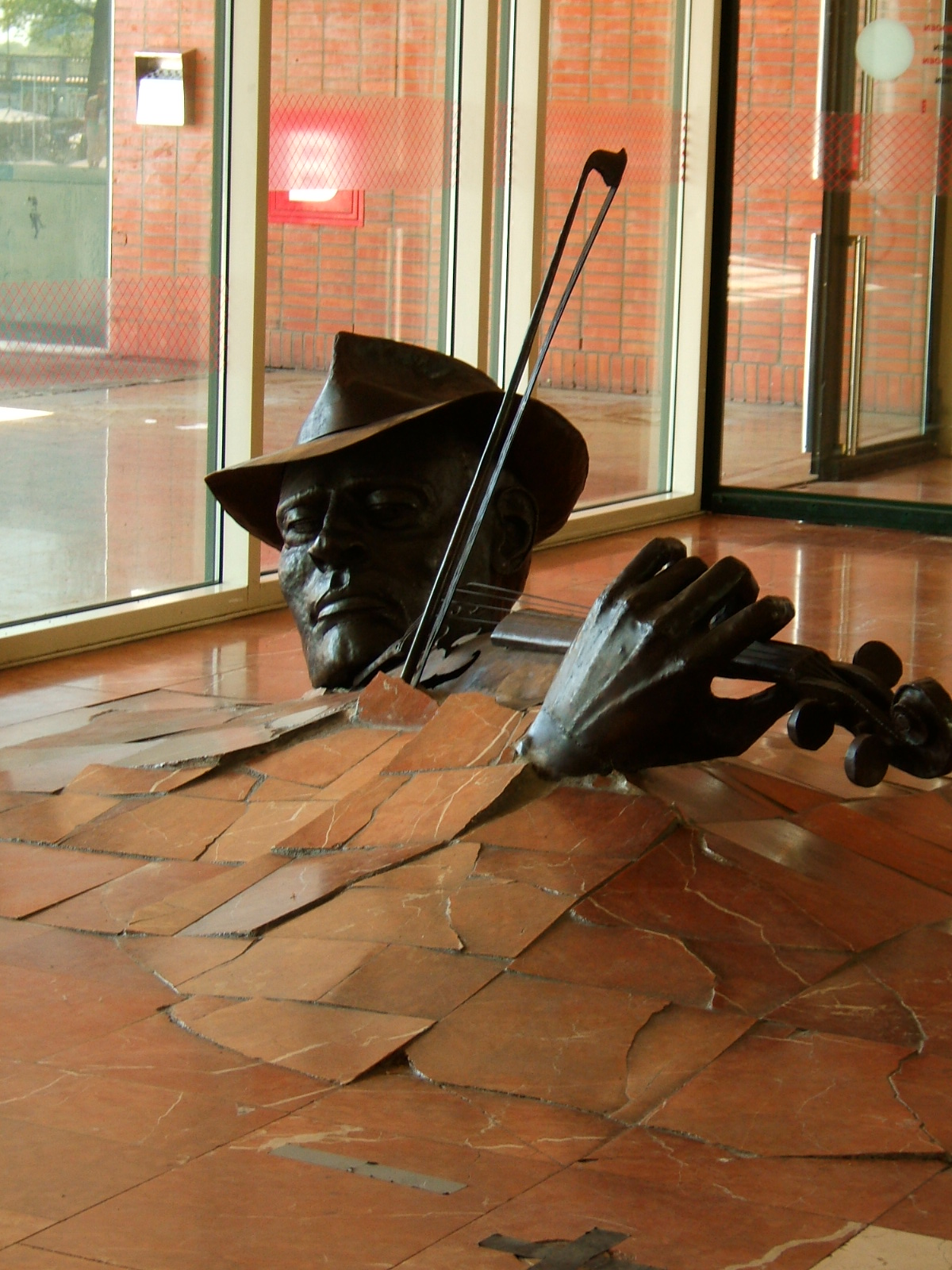
The Violinist, Stopera in Amsterdam

== Identity ==
The sculptor's identity (or possibly identities) has remained unknown. The suspects have included Gene Holt, an American sculptor, who denied his involvement in 2013, and the former Queen Beatrix of the Netherlands. It has been stated by the Government of Amsterdam that the sculptor is a medical person of note, who wishes to remain anonymous.

== The Breast Plate ==
"The Breast Plate" is a small sculpture of a hand on a woman's breast, located between the stones at Oudekerksplein. It is the fourth piece of art made by the anonymous artist and gives the best clue as to who this artist is. It appeared suddenly in the middle of the city at the end of February 1993, but within a week it was removed by the government. This turned out to be easier said than done, as the sculpture was fixed to one meter's depth of concrete. There were several reasons for the removal: the sculpture was causing a lot of noise when people stepped on it, there was no permit for its placement, and its subject was deemed "inappropriate" for the middle of the red light district. After a public announcement that the statue would not be replaced, the sculptor presented himself at the Amsterdam department of art. It was decided that the statue would be returned to its place with some additional insulation to decrease the noise. The city agreed to keep the identity of the sculptor secret, and since July 1993, the sculpture can be appreciated at its original location at Oudekerksplein.

== Main attributed works ==
- "The Blue Fiddler", 1982, Raampoort, Amsterdam
- "The Tree Saw", 1989, Leidseplein, Amsterdam
- "With Nose in Books", 1990, Velsen
- "The Violinist", 1991, Stopera, Amsterdam
- "The Breast Plate, or Streaked Breast", 1993, Oudekerksplein, Amsterdam
- "The Accordion Player", 1994, Anjeliersstraat 175, Amsterdam
- "Three Dandies in Conversation", 1995, Kinkerstraat, Amsterdam
- "The Nun", 1999, Amersfoort (since 2007, Stadhuisplein)
