= Frank Majoor =

Dutch diplomat

Frank Majoor (born 1 April 1949, Tilburg) is the Permanent Representative of the Kingdom of the Netherlands to NATO. He started in this position in 2009, from 2005 he was the Permanent Representative to the United Nations before which he was the secretary general of the Ministry of Foreign Affairs. He is a member of the Christian Democratic Appeal.

Diplomatic posts
Preceded by Dirk Jan van den Berg	Permanent Representative of the Kingdom of the Netherlands to the United Nations; 2005–present	Incumbent
