= Oude Kerk, Amsterdam =

Church building in Amsterdam, Netherlands

Oude Kerk
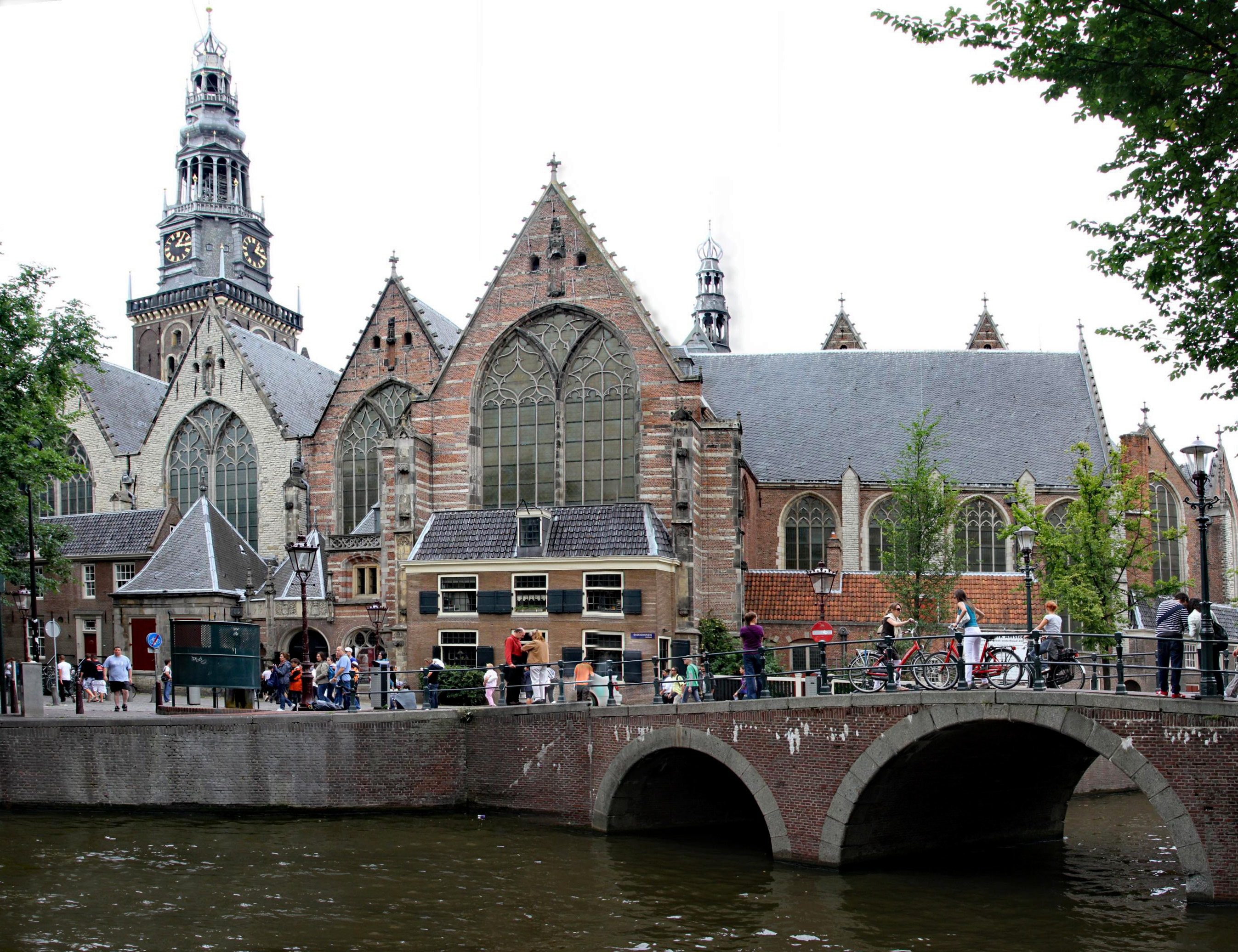
- Oude Kerk, viewed from across the Oudezijds Voorburgwal
- Oude Kerk
- 52.3744°N 4.8980°E
- Location: Oudekerksplein 23; Amsterdam, Netherlands
- Denomination: Protestant Church in the Netherlands
- Previous denomination: Roman Catholic
- Website: Website

The Oude Kerk (English: Old Church) is a Reformed church in Amsterdam, Netherlands, being the oldest parish church in the city. The oldest structure in Amsterdam, the building was founded around 1213 and consecrated in 1306 as a Roman Catholic church by the bishop of Utrecht with Saint Nicolas as its patron saint. After the Reformation in 1578, it became a Reformed (Calvinist) church, which it remains today. It is located in De Wallen and since 2012, the church has also housed contemporary art exhibitions. The square surrounding the church is the Oudekerksplein.

== History ==
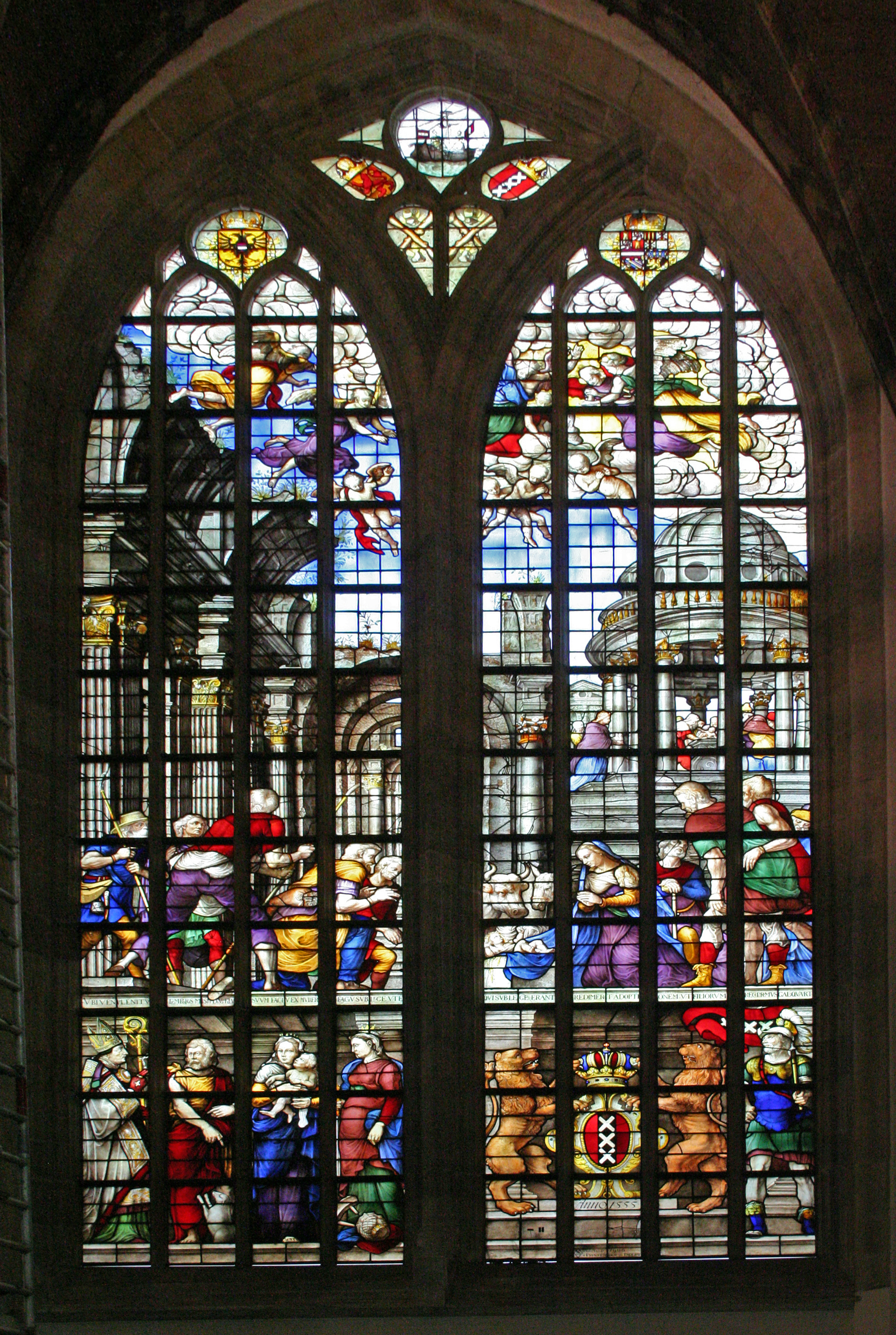
Church Window, Oude Kerk

By around 1213, a wooden chapel had been erected at the location of today's Oude Kerk. Over time, this structure was replaced by a stone church that was consecrated in 1306.

The church has seen a number of renovations performed by 15 generations of Amsterdam citizens. The church stood for only a half-century before the first alterations were made; the aisles were lengthened and wrapped around the choir in a half circle to support the structure. Not long after the turn of the 15th century, north and south transepts were added to the church creating a cross formation. Work on these renovations was completed in 1460, though it is likely that progress was largely interrupted by the great fires that besieged the city in 1421 and 1452.

Before the Alteratie, or Reformation in Amsterdam of 1578, the Oude Kerk was Roman Catholic. Following William the Silent's defeat of the Spanish in the Dutch Revolt, the church was taken over by the Calvinist Dutch Reformed Church. Throughout the 16th-century battles, the church was looted and defaced on numerous occasions, first in the Beeldenstorm of 1566, when a mob destroyed most of the church art and fittings, including an altarpiece with a central panel by Jan van Scorel and side panels painted on both sides by Maarten van Heemskerck. Only the paintings on the ceiling, which were unreachable, were spared.

The church also functioned as a public gathering space for churchgoers to socialize, vendors to sell their goods, and the poor to seek shelter. This was not tolerated by the Calvinists, however, and the homeless were expelled. In 1681, the choir was closed off with an oak screen. Above the screen is the text, The prolonged misuse of God's church, were here undone again in the year seventy-eight, referring to the Reformation of 1578.

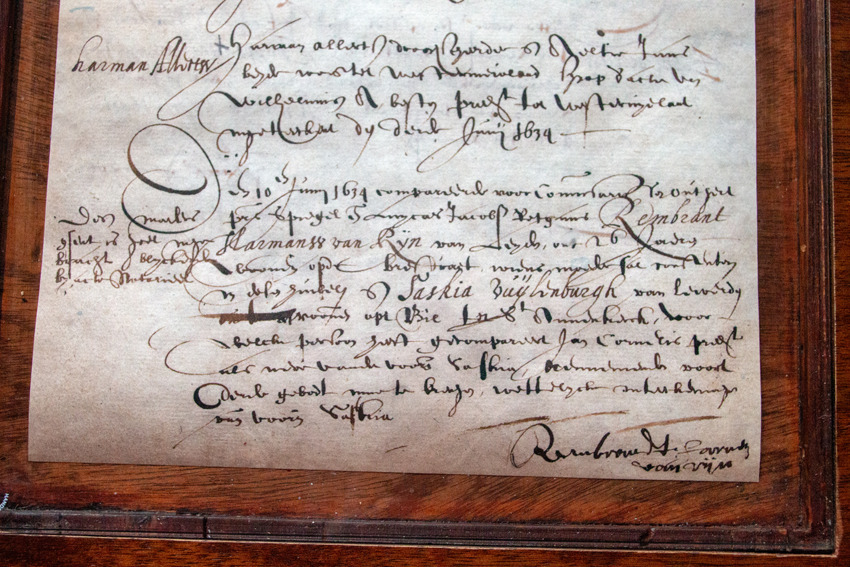
Rembrandt's marriage record on display in the church

In that same year, the Oude Kerk became home to the registry of marriages. It was also used as the city archives; the most important documents were locked in a chest covered with iron plates and painted with the city's coat of arms. The chest was kept safe in the iron chapel.

Rembrandt was a frequent visitor to the Oude Kerk and his children were all christened here. The Oude Kerk is one of the historic buildings in Amsterdam associated with Rembrandt. In the Holy Sepulchre is a small Rembrandt exhibition, a shrine to his wife Saskia van Uylenburgh who was buried here in 1642. Each year on 9 March (8 March in leap years), at 8:39 am, the early morning sun briefly illuminates her tomb. An early spring breakfast event is held annually.

== Structure ==
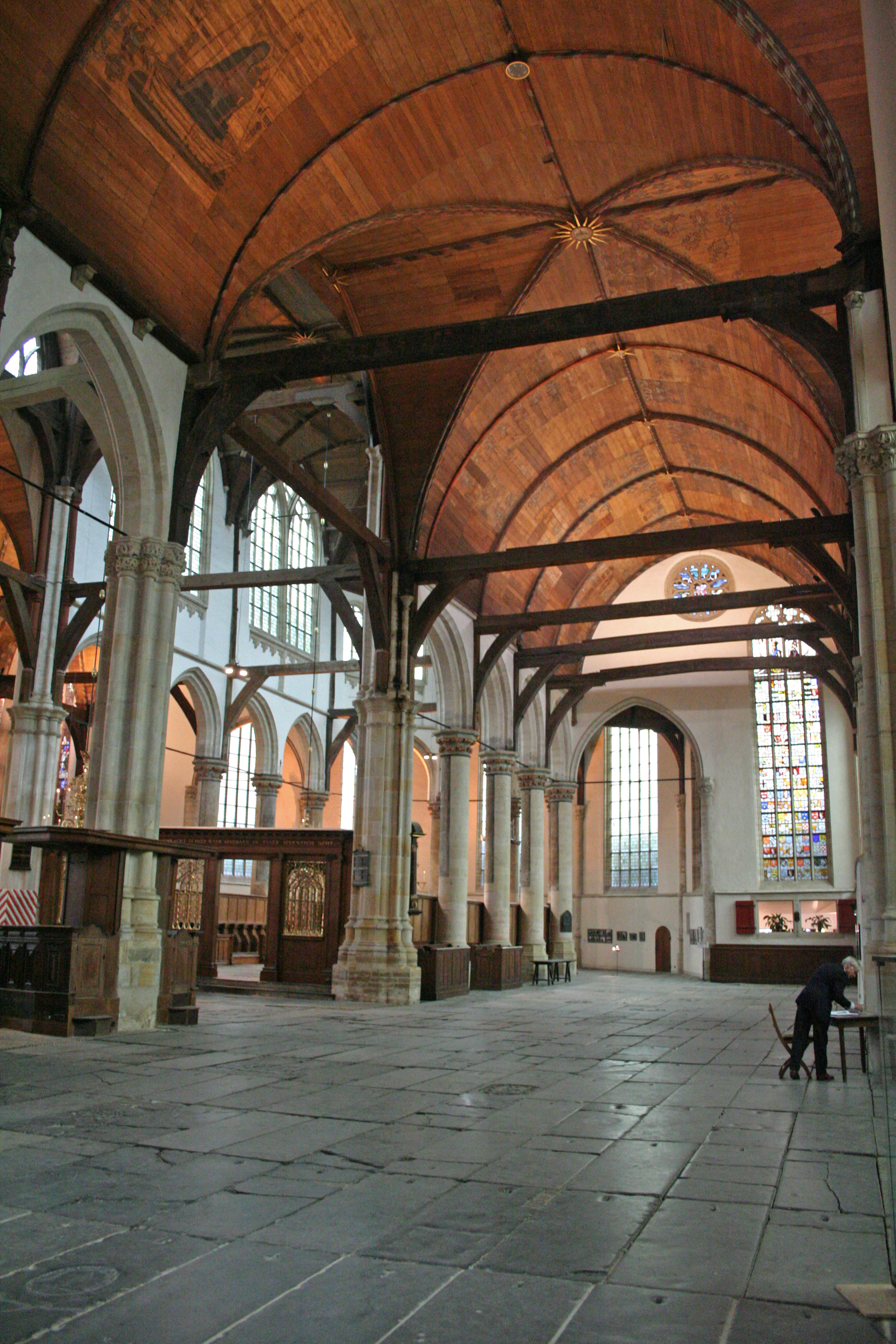
Wooden ceiling and floor paved with gravestones

The church covers an area of some 3,300 m^{2} (36,000 sq ft). The foundations were set on an artificial mound, thought to be the most solid ground of the settlement in this marshy province.

The ceiling of the Oude Kerk is the largest medieval wooden vault in Europe. The Estonian oak planks date to 1390 and are noted for their acoustics.

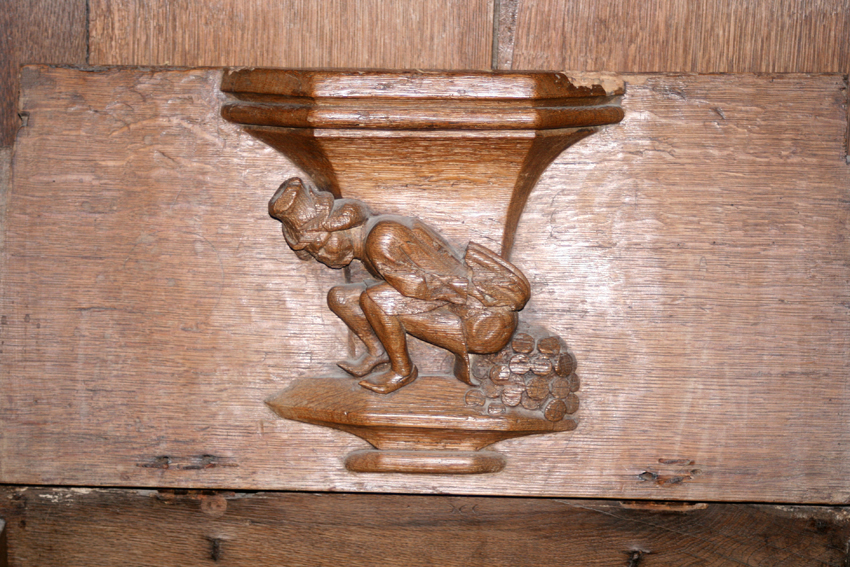
Misericord

The Oude Kerk contains 12 misericords, leaning posts installed under the folding seats of the choir stalls.

=== Graves ===
The floor consists entirely of gravestones. The reason for this is that the church was built on a cemetery. Local citizens continued to be buried on the site within the confines of the church until 1865. There are 2,500 gravestones in the Oude Kerk, under which are buried 60,000 Amsterdam citizens, including:

- Jacob van Heemskerck, naval hero
- Jan Pieterszoon Sweelinck, composer and organist
- Adriaen Block, trader and explorer
- Catharina Questiers, poet and dramatist
- Jacob de Graeff Dircksz., Amsterdam regent
- Andries de Graeff, Amsterdam regent
- Cornelis de Graeff, Amsterdam regent
- Catharina Hooft, woman of the Dutch golden age
- Pieter Lastman, painter
- Willem van der Zaan, Admiral
- Laurens Bake, poet
- Abraham van der Hulst, Admiral
- Saskia van Uylenburgh, Wife of Rembrandt
- Cornelis Hooft, statesman
- Jan Jacobszoon Hinlopen, merchant
- Kiliaen van Rensselaer, owner of the only successful patroonship in New Netherland, Rensselaerswyck.
- Frans Banninck Cocq, burgomaster (mayor) of Amsterdam and central figure in Rembrandts masterpiece The Night Watch
- Nicasius de Sille, Ambassador
- Caspar Commelijn, botanist
- Jan van der Heyden, painter and print maker
- Johannes Hudde, burgomaster of Amsterdam and mathematician
- Lucretia Wilhelmina van Merken, dramatist and poet
- Jacob Beeldsnyder, the only enslaved person so far identified

=== Organs ===
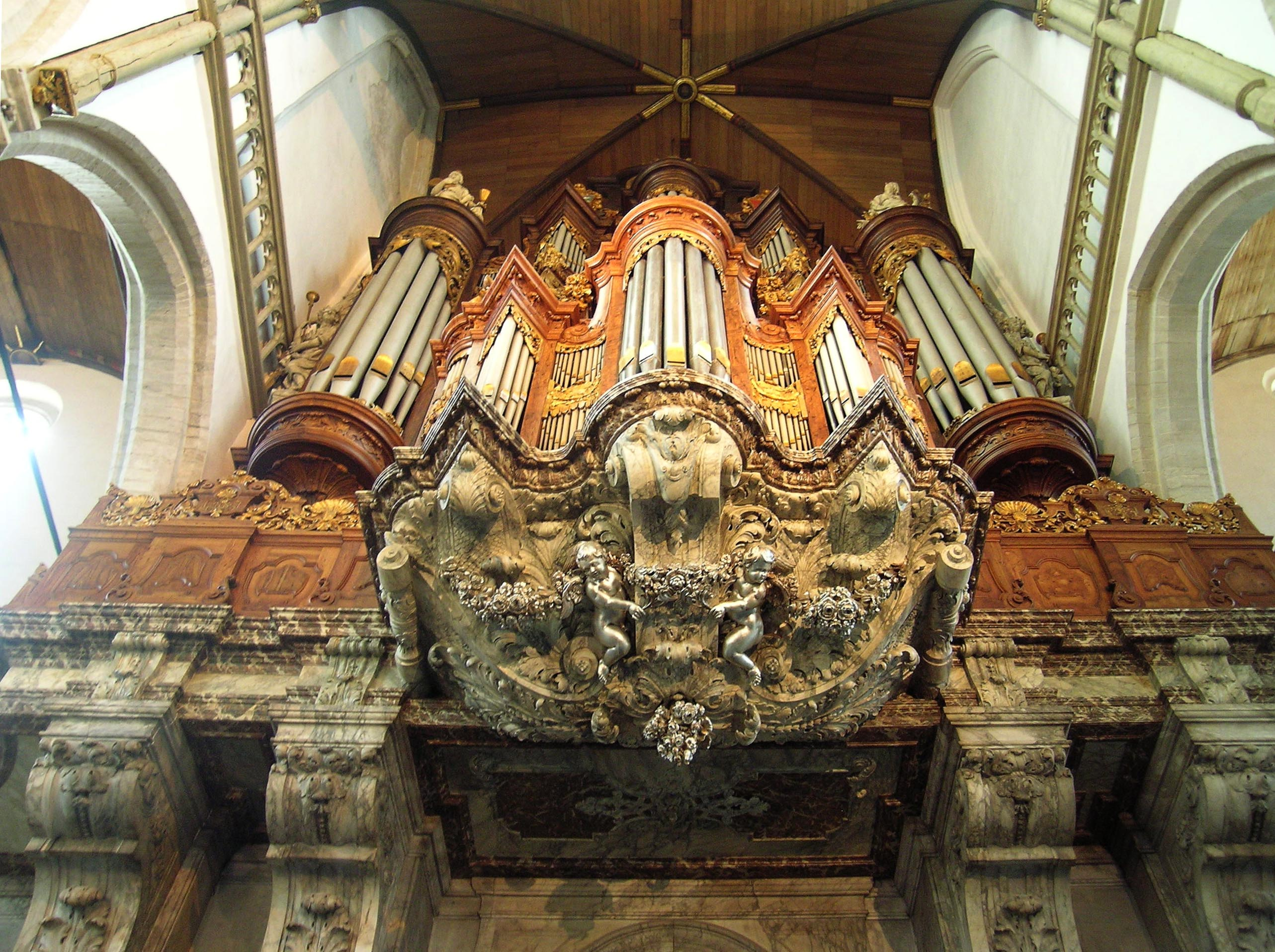
The baroque underside of the Vater-Müller organ

The Oude Kerk holds four pipe organs, the old church organ built in 1658 and the cabinet organ built in 1767. The third was built by the German Christian Vater in 1724 and is regarded as one of the finest Baroque organs in Europe. It was acknowledged by the church Commissioners as "perfect". The organ was dismantled whilst renovations were made to the church tower in 1738, and upon reassembling it, Casper Müller made alterations to give the organ more force. It became known as the Vater-Müller organ, to acknowledge the improvement of sound. The organ underwent a complete restoration between 2014 and 2019. The fourth was constructed for the church by Organi Puccini of Pisa in 2010.

A bust of the organist and composer Jan Pieterszoon Sweelinck (1562–1621) celebrates the lifetime he spent playing in the church. His early career began at the age of fifteen when he succeeded his deceased father Pieter Swybertszoon as the Oude Kerk's organist. He went on to compose music for all 150 Psalms and secured an international reputation as a leading Dutch composer. His music would also be played over the city from the church's bell tower. He is buried in the church.

== Today ==
Oude Kerk holds church services on the Lord's Day (Sunday) at 11 am, as well as vespers at 6:30 pm.

The Oude Kerk includes a centre for contemporary art and heritage. Artists including Nicolas Jaar, Marinus Boezem, Christian Boltanski, Janet Cardiff and George Bures Miller were commissioned by the Oude Kerk to create site-specific installations. The church also has a permanent exhibit on its history and that of the city of Amsterdam.

In mid-March each year, Catholics arrive at the Oude Kerk to celebrate the "Miracle of Amsterdam" that occurred in 1345. After taking communion, a dying man vomited the Host. When his vomit was thrown into a fire, the Host did not burn and was proclaimed a miracle. The Host was put in a chest and installed at the Oude Kerk; however, it disappeared during the Reformation.

== See also ==
- 16th-century Western domes

== Gallery ==
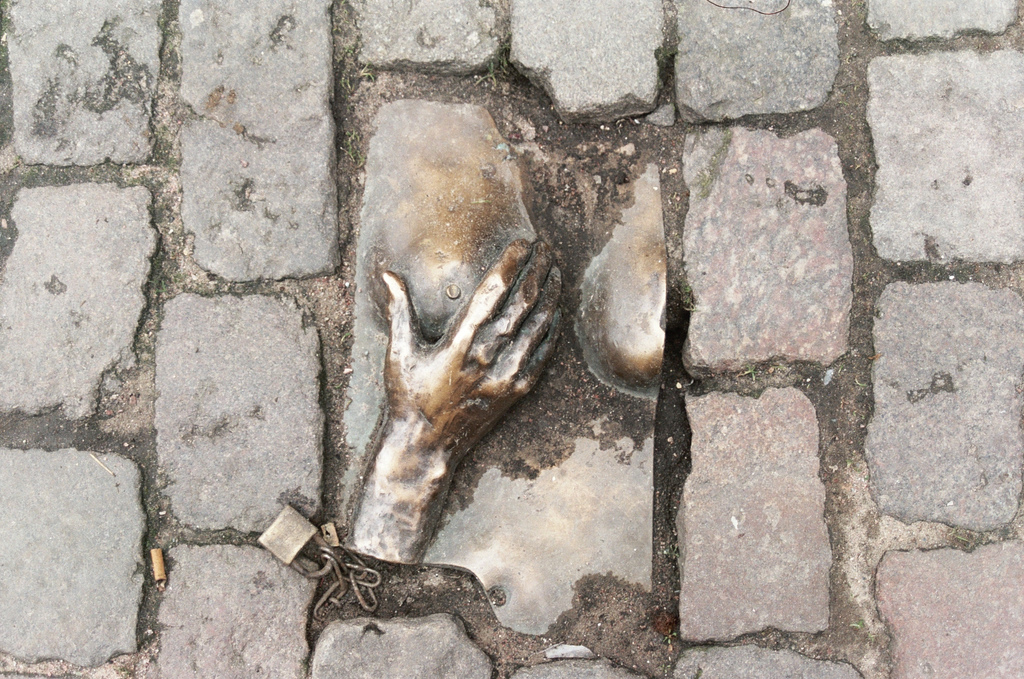
Bronze relief in the cobblestone of Oudekerksplein.

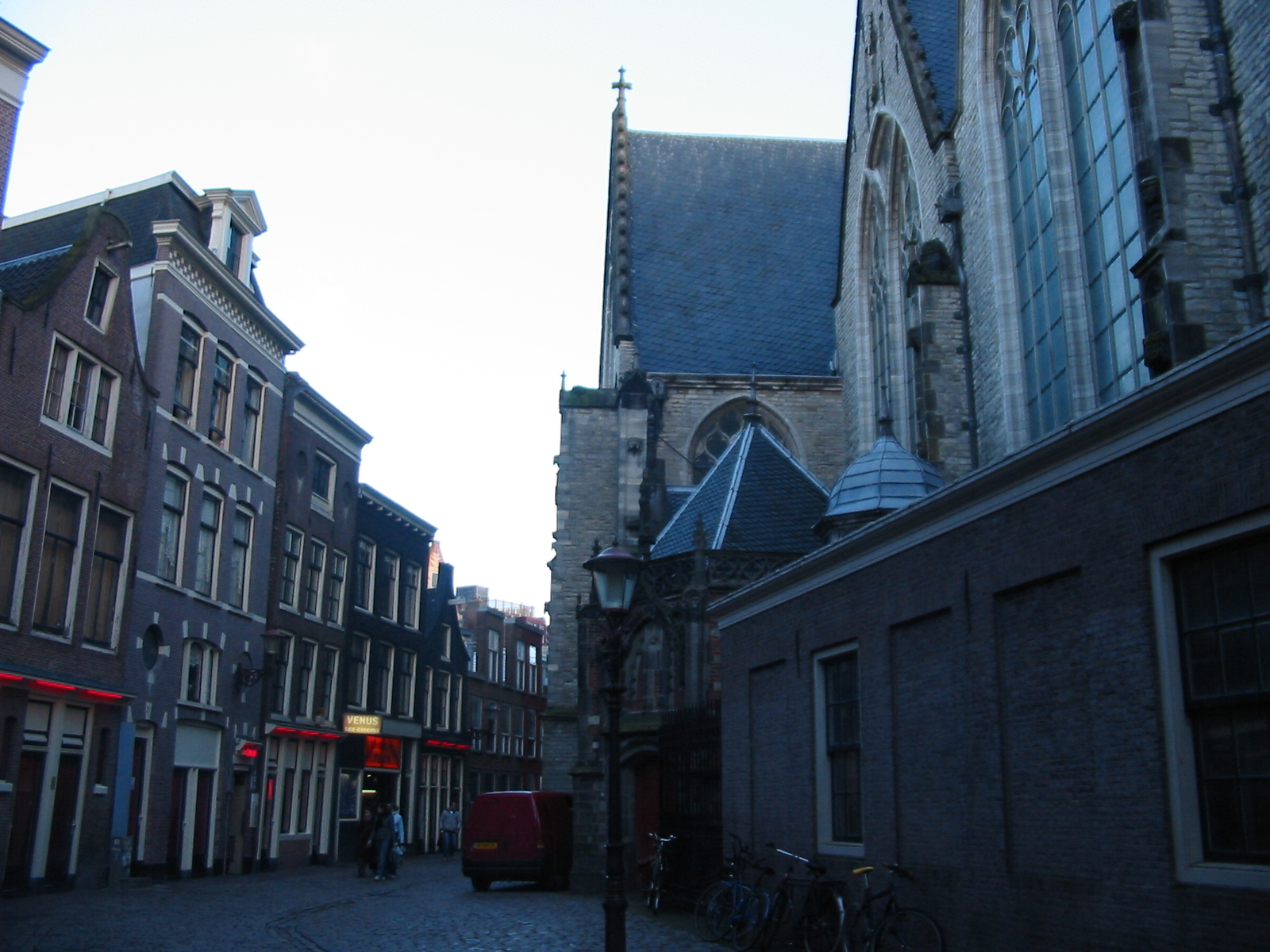
Prostitutes' windows on the Oudekerksplein behind the Oude Kerk.

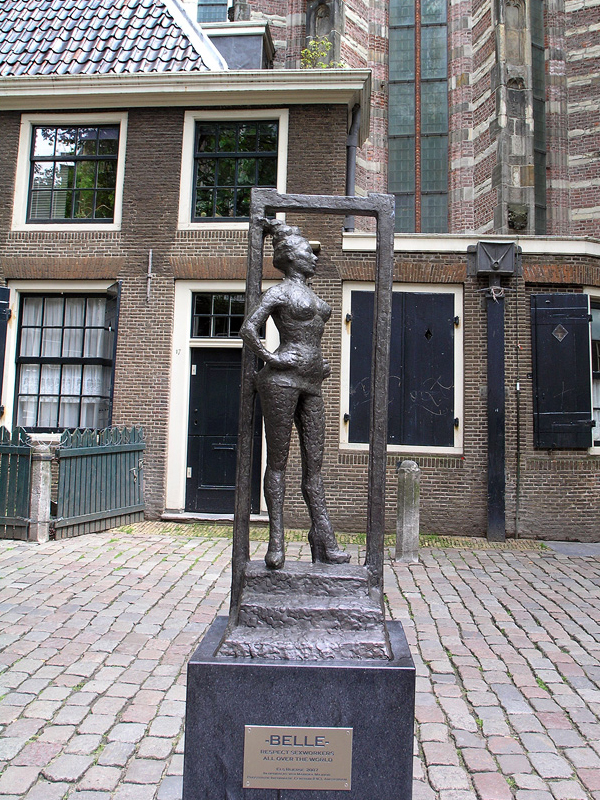
Bronze statue Belle in front of the Oude Kerk. Inscription says "Respect sex workers all over the world."

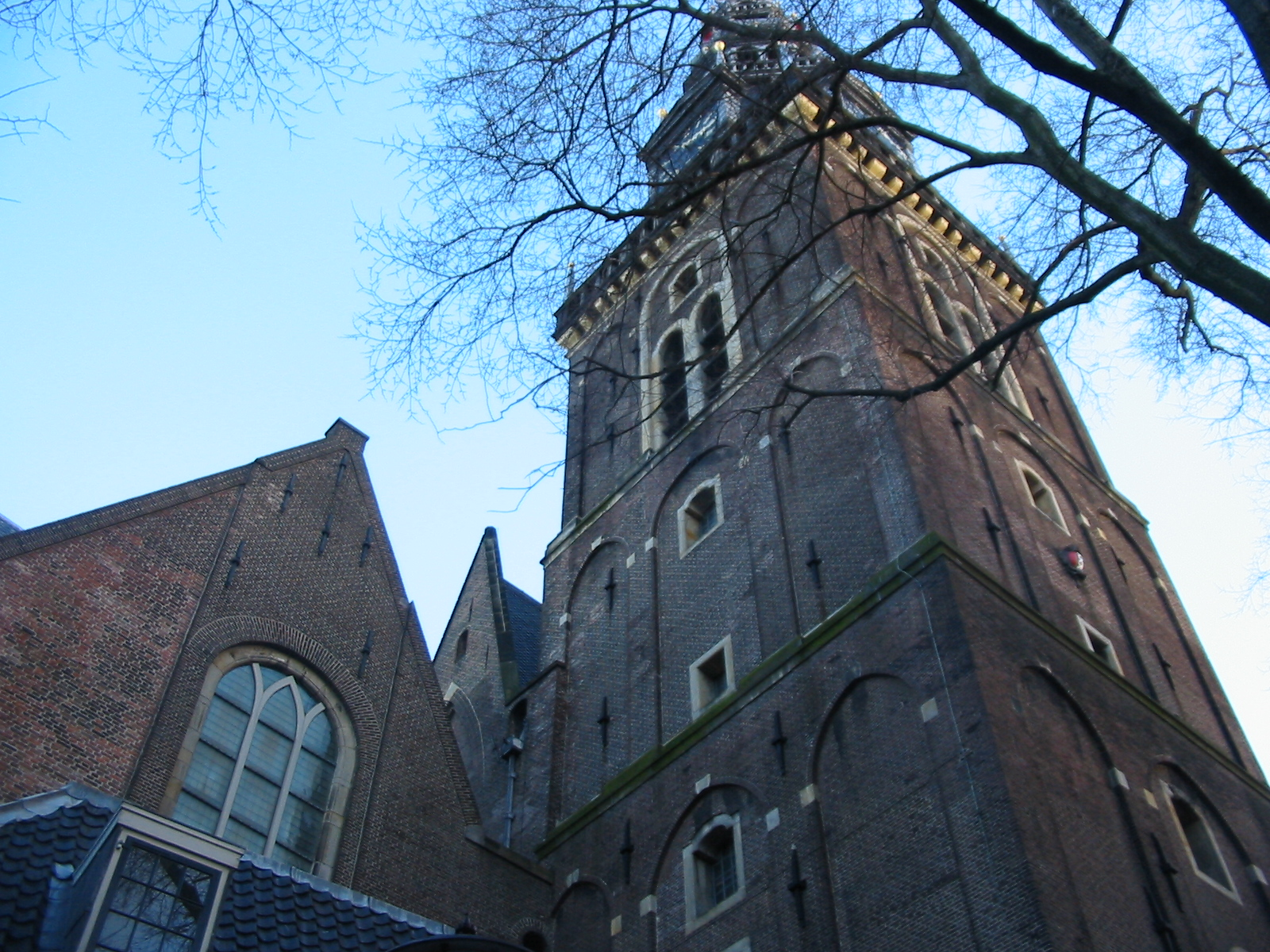
Tower

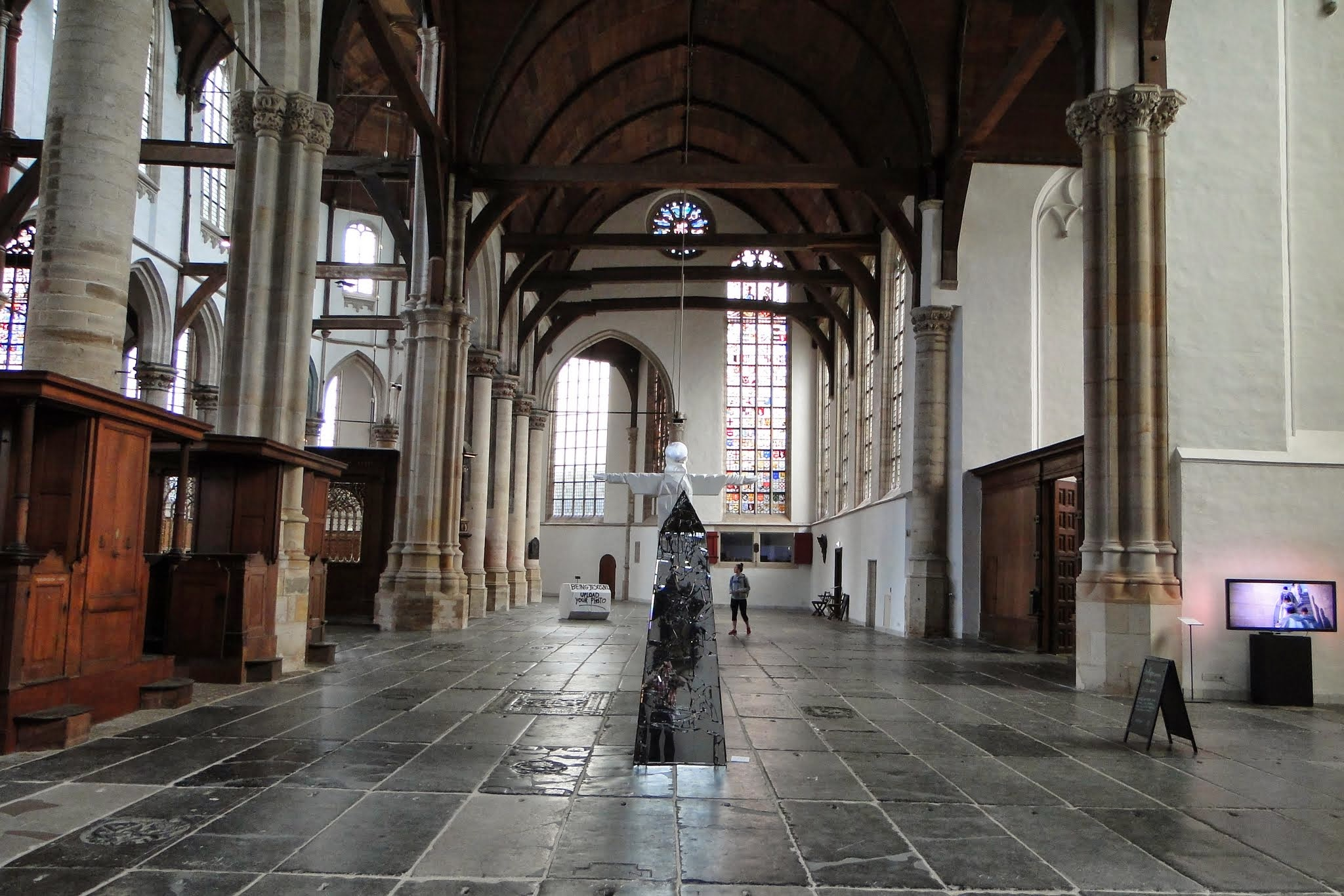
Interior of the Oude Kerk.

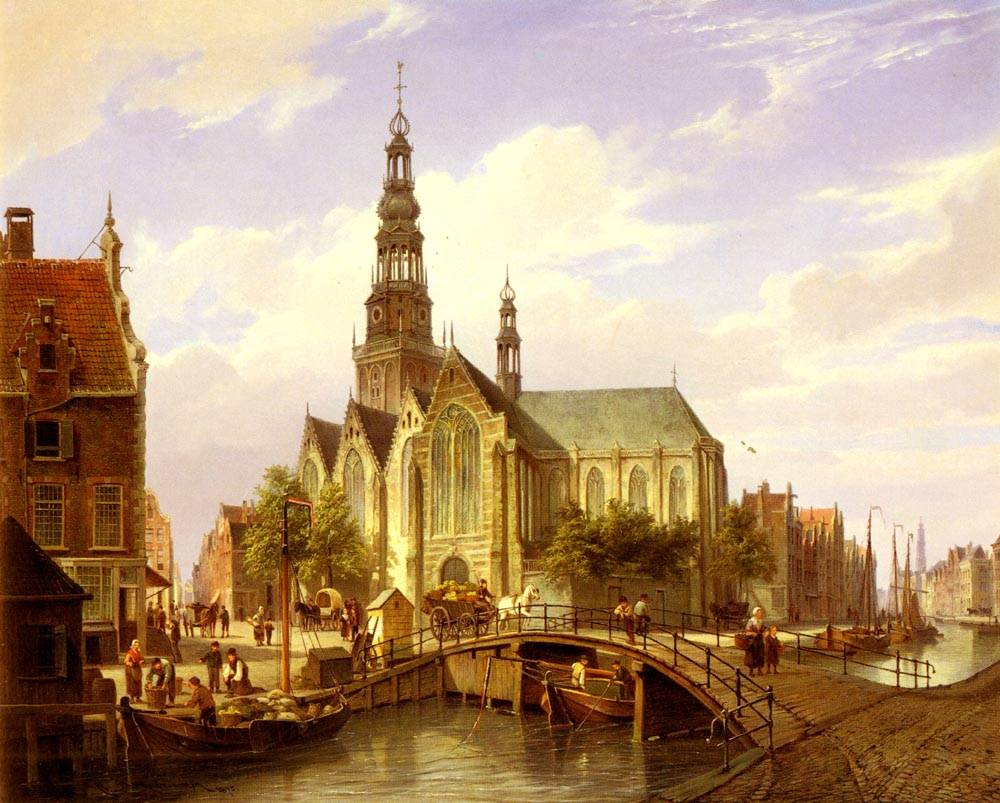
Cornelis Christiaan Dommersen a Capriccio view of Oude Kerk, 1875.
