= De Wallen =

Largest and best known red-light district in Amsterdam

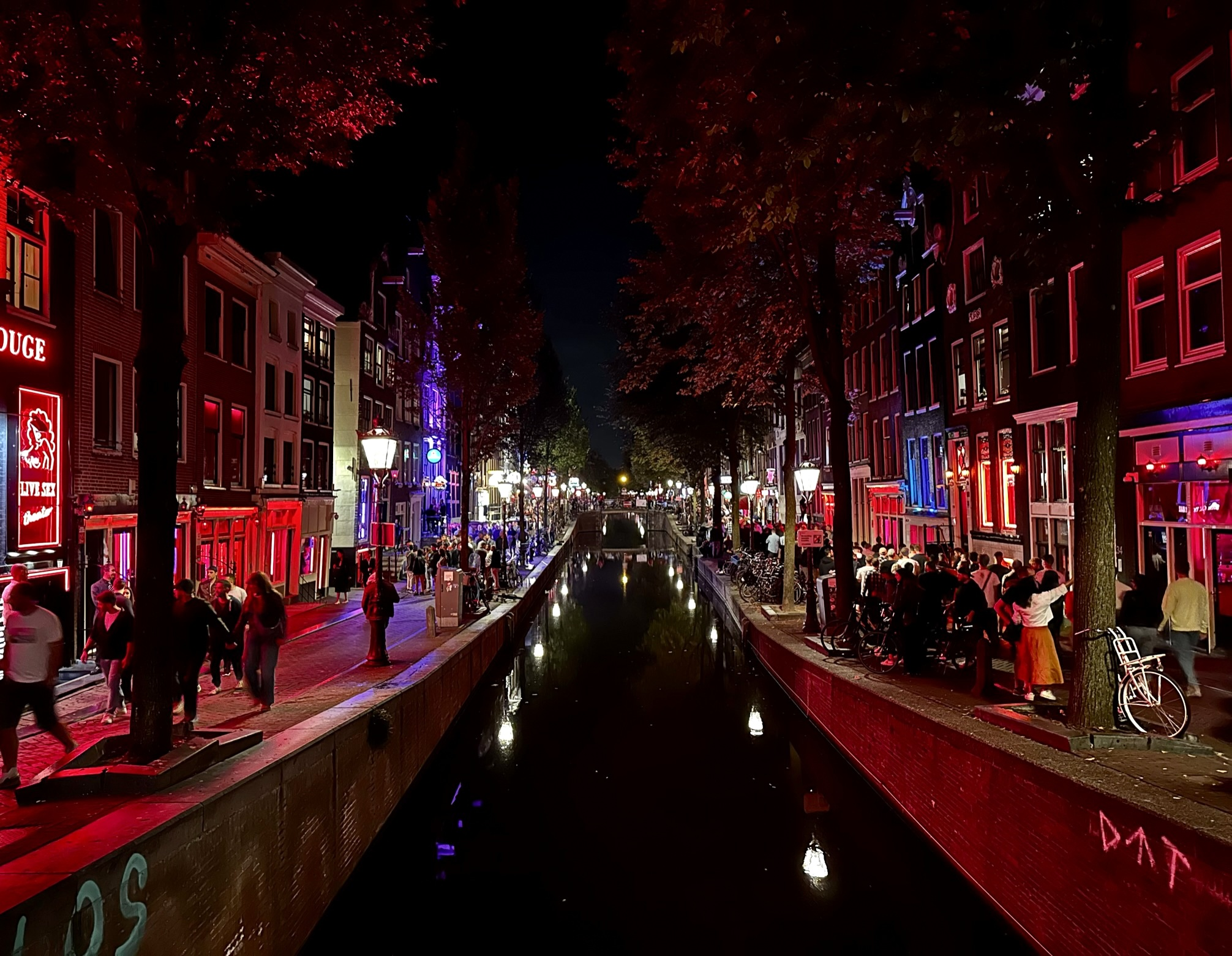
- Crowds walking past window prostitution and other sex businesses along the Oudezijds Achterburgwal canal in De Wallen

- De Wallen in Amsterdam
- Coordinates: 52°22′24″N 4°53′53″E
- Country: Netherlands
- Province: North Holland
- Municipality: Amsterdam

De Wallen (Dutch pronunciation: [də ˈʋɑlə(n)]) is the largest and best known red-light district in Amsterdam. It consists of a network of alleys containing approximately 300 one-room cabins rented by prostitutes who offer their sexual services from behind a window or glass door, typically illuminated with red lights and blacklight. Window prostitution is the most visible and typical kind of red-light district sex work in Amsterdam.

De Wallen, together with prostitution areas Singelgebied and Ruysdaelkade, form the Rosse Buurt (red-light areas) of Amsterdam. Of these, De Wallen is the oldest and largest area. It is one of the city's major tourist attractions. Thursday through Sunday access to De Wallen is restricted at 1:00 am, with bars and restaurants closing at 2:00 am and brothels at 3:00 am.

The area also has a number of sex shops, sex theatres, peep shows, a sex museum, a cannabis museum, and a number of coffeeshops that sell cannabis.

== History ==
The Rokin and Damrak run along the original course of the river Amstel. These two roads meet in Dam Square which marks the spot where a bridge was built across the river in 1270. It had doors which were used to dam the river at certain times to avoid flooding. The Damrak then became a harbor and it was around this area that the red-light district first appeared. The walled canals led to the names De Wallen and Walletjes (little walls).

Historically because of proximity to the harbor the area has attracted both prostitution and migrant populations and these are the features it is best known for today.

From late medieval times, the trade started to be restricted. Married men and priests were forbidden to enter the area. In 1578, during the Dutch Revolt against Spanish rule, a Protestant city board was formed with fornication deemed punishable. Sex workers were banned and forced underground. They would work for a madam who provided room and board, protection and advice. Often the madam and girls would venture out at night visiting pubs and inns to pick up clients. Parlours remained illegal but tolerated if kept hidden. Trade remained small-scale though spread across the city. Well-known areas were De Haarlemmerdijk, De Houttuinen, Zeedijk and around the harbor.

In the 18th century, wealthy men would meet prostitutes at gambling houses on De Gelderskade and Zeedijk. The women would then take the men back to the parlors where they came from. However, these were often unappealing to a gentleman of means. A solution to this problem was for the gambling houses to provide board for the women. This suited everyone including the authorities. The gambling houses invested in luxury furnishings and gradually they became brothels employing up to 30 women. Famous brothels included De Pijl in Pijlstraat, De Fonteyn in Nieuwmarkt and Madame Therese on the Prinsengracht. For those who could not afford entry to these houses, there were still women to be found around Oudekerksplein and unofficial policies of tolerance remained, although prostitution was technically illegal.

In 1811, the ban on prostitution was lifted. In this Napoleonic era, men from the French Imperial Naval Corps were the main clients for prostitutes in De Wallen. Regulation was introduced and there were compulsory health checks to protect soldiers from venereal diseases. They were given a red card which was a permit to work. If found to be infected the card was taken until they could prove they were disease free. Because there was no reliable treatment for syphilis at this time this led to dangerous treatments such as mercury baths to ease symptoms.

In the early 20th century, religious organizations ran campaigns to try to end prostitution. In 1911, a law was passed banning brothels and pimping, but prostitution was not outlawed. Once again it was driven underground and tolerated as long it did not cause a disturbance. With the closure of many parlors in De Wallen, some women moved to De Pijp. In 1935, it was estimated that there were around 150 disguised parlors. Fronts included massage, pedicure, manicure, and beauty treatments. Sex workers continued to work around the Oudekerksplein. Instead of being as visible as they are today, they would stand behind closed curtains and peer through a small crack looking for customers. If they stood in the doorway, they would be arrested.

== Location ==
The total area is approximately 6,500 square metres (1.6 acres), limited by the Niezel in the north, the sea dike/Nieuwmarkt in the east, the Sint Jansstraat in the south and the Warmoesstraat in the west. Prostitution takes place within this area in the following streets: Barndesteeg, Bethlehemsteeg, Bloedstraat, Boomsteeg (now closed), Dollebegijnensteeg, Enge Kerksteeg, Goldbergersteeg, Gordijnensteeg, Molensteeg, Monnikenstraat, Oudekerksplein, Oudekennissteeg, Oudezijds Achterburgwal, Oudezijds Voorburgwal, Sint Annendwarsstraat, Sint Annenstraat, Stoofsteeg, and Trompettersteeg.

Between Sint Jansstraat and Sint Annenstraat and running parallel to them are Leidekkerssteeg, Gooijersteeg, Blaauwlakensteeg, and Zwartlakensteeg. At least three of these had red light windows which were closed in the 1970s. Today these alleys are blocked by locked gates although the remains of some bricked over windows can be seen in the architecture. In the 1990s Slapersteeg was also closed and a gate now blocks the alley.

In the 1990s parts of Sint Annenstraat and Sint Annendwarsstraat were demolished. The rooms in Goldbergersteeg were opened after this time.

== Sex work ==
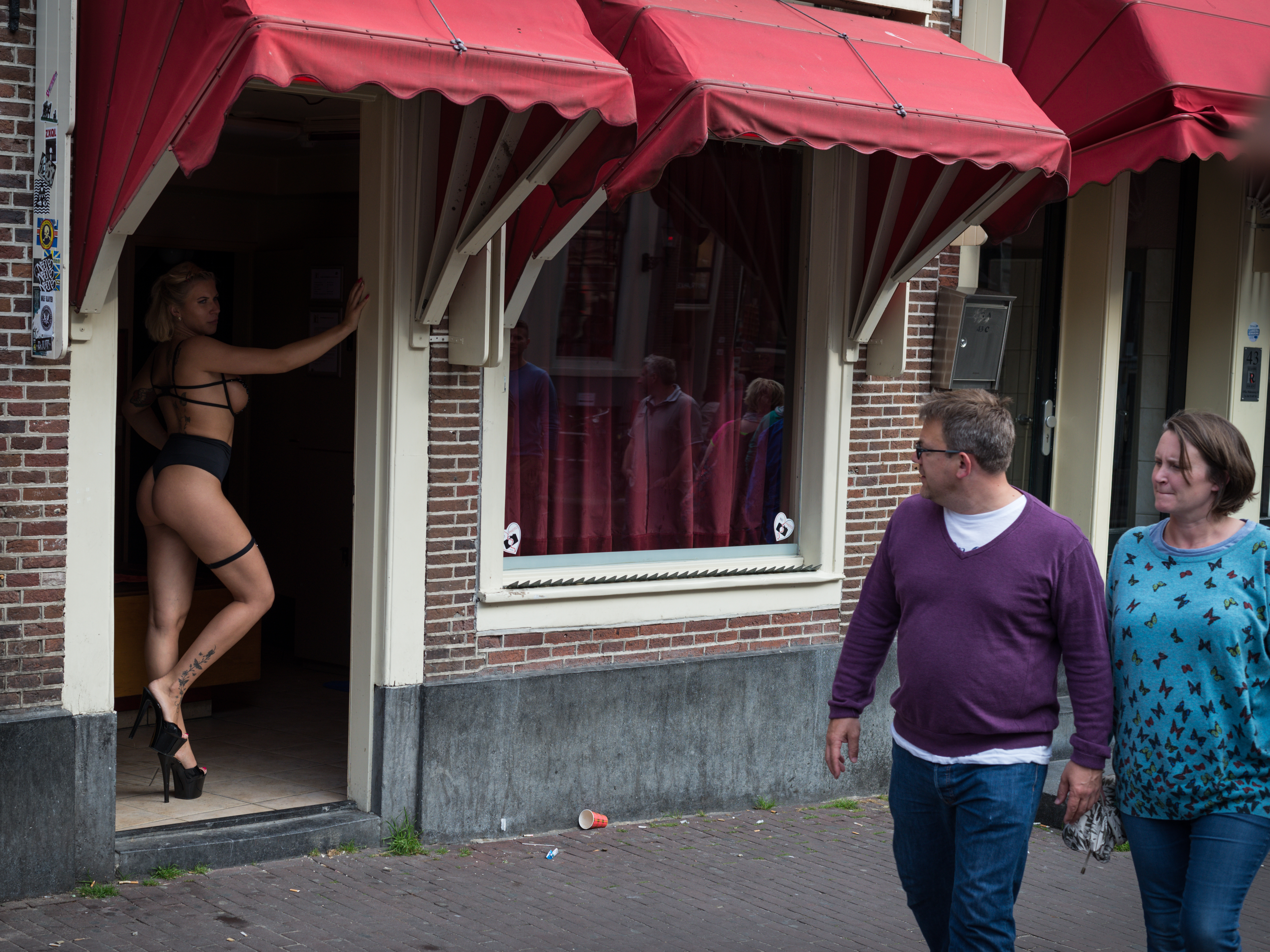
Sex worker at a door

Prostitution is legal in the Netherlands, with the exception of street prostitution, but work permits are not issued in the form of a green card for prostitution; therefore legally working in the trade is limited mostly to EU citizens or foreign permanent residents. A non-EU citizen can work legally in the Netherlands without a work permit in certain circumstances, for instance, if they are the spouse of a local citizen. From January 2013 the legal working age of a prostitute in the Netherlands was raised from 18 to 21.

There is no compulsory requirement for sex workers to undergo sexually transmitted disease (STD) or HIV testing in the Netherlands. RIVM, the National Institute for Public Health and the Environment, recommends that sex workers be tested four times a year. Some brothels and clubs have their sex workers screened at a regular basis, but no formal guidelines exist. Brothel owners and room operators often require health certificates such as the SERVSAFE test before employing or leasing rooms.

To counter negative publicity, Mariska Majoor, founder of the Prostitution Information Center, organized two "open days" in February 2006 and March 2007, allowing visitors access to some window brothels and peep shows and informing them about the working conditions there. Majoor was also instrumental in having the world's first monument to sex workers installed in the red light district. The bronze statue was unveiled on the Oudekerksplein in front of the Oude Kerk at the open day in March 2007 and shows a woman standing in a doorway.

=== Red lights and blue lights ===
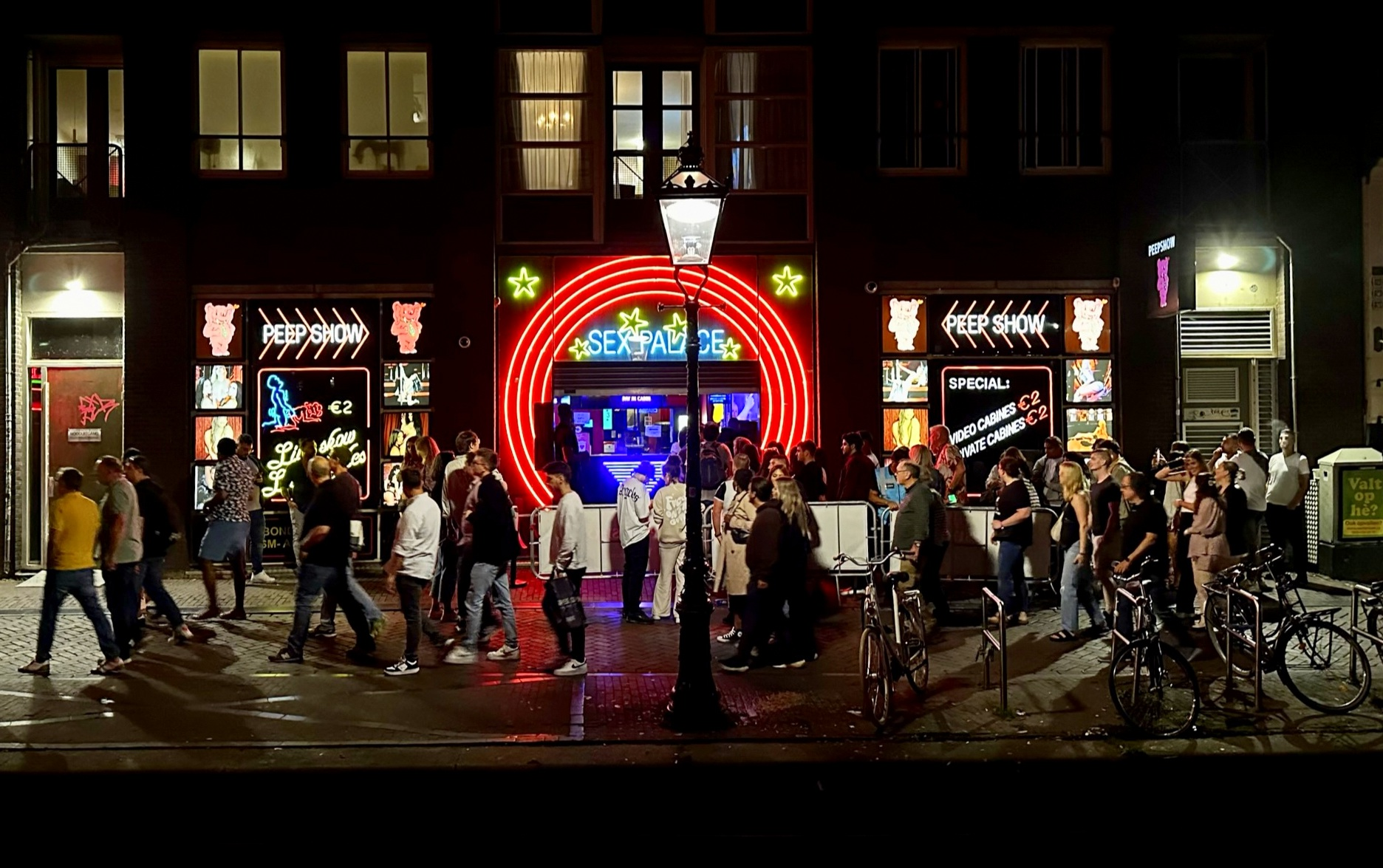
Red lights are also used by businesses such as peep shows.

In De Wallen, cisgender women sex workers illuminate their windows with red lights, while transgender women sex workers use blue lights. This is to help customers differentiate between the two. Bloedstraat, a street in De Wallen, has numerous transgender women working in it using blue lights.

The police close down several male brothels each year, so it is difficult to determine how many still operate in the country. However, there is only one legal brothel still in use, called "Club 21".

== Cannabis coffeeshops ==
Cannabis coffeeshops in the RLD and elsewhere in the Netherlands are licensed to sell cannabis and serve soft drinks. Some may serve small packaged food, or even whole meals infused with cannabis. The sale of tobacco on its own is not permitted, but many offer pre-rolled joints filled with a mix of cannabis and tobacco. Alcoholic beverages are not permitted inside of coffeeshops.

Before the onset of coffeeshop licensing, some began openly selling cannabis. The first coffee shops opened in the 1970s. These faced trouble from police and the local councils with frequent closures. In 1976, the government of the Netherlands began to take steps to decriminalize the use and possession of cannabis by changing the law so that possession of up to 30 grams (1 oz) of cannabis was no longer a criminal offense.

The "gedoogbeleid" or tolerance policy gave rise to coffeeshop licensing which meant that as long as coffeeshops did not sell hard drugs, they were allowed to operate. Coffeeshops were not allowed to operate in certain cities near the borders of Germany and Belgium because it was felt soft drug use might raise crime there.

The government of Netherlands has continually been under pressure from different western countries to rein in coffeeshops, leading to several coffeeshops being shut down for flouting rules, with no licenses issued to new operators. This approach has continued since 1995. In the 1990s, the coffeeshop owners organized themselves into a union, the Bond van Cannabis Detaillisten or BCD, set up to represent the interests of the coffeeshops which were under constant pressure from local councils.

A recent policy meant that 26 coffeeshops in the De Wallen area had to close their doors between 1 September 2012 and 31 August 2015.

== Crime, human rights abuse, and human trafficking concerns ==
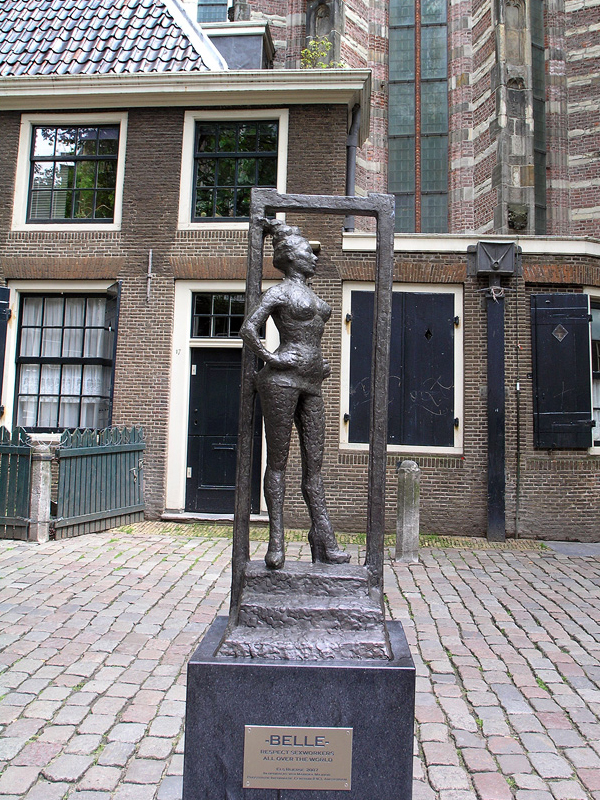
Bronze statue Belle in front of the Oude Kerk by Els Rijerse

Netherlands has been listed by a report of the UN Office on Drugs and Crime as a top destination for victims of human trafficking.

According to Job Cohen, the former mayor of Amsterdam, "We've realized this is no longer about small-scale entrepreneurs, but those big crime organizations are involved here in trafficking women, drugs, killings, and other criminal activities".

Groups of sex workers have also worked to raise awareness of their rights. The Prostitute Information Centre, founded in the 1990s, is a prostitute-led organisation offering tours of the area and information concerning safety and the rights of the people involved. While sex workers in brothels currently have to register, it has been suggested making escorts and kamer workers register, which has been opposed by some sex worker groups out of concern it would favor pimps over the workers themselves. Jan Fisher of Red Thread commented: "The ones who want to work know how devastating the stigma could be, and will be. They will try to work outside this system and they'll be vulnerable when they're detected by the police and tax office, and the ones who are trafficked may be forced by their pimps to register so they have a kind of legal status."

In 2007, a statue called "Belle" was unveiled on the Oudekerksplein with the inscription "Respect sex workers all over the world".

About 75% of Amsterdam's prostitutes are from Eastern Europe, Africa, and Asia, according to a former prostitute who produced a report about the sex trade.

European citizens of the 27 member EU states have the legal right under internal market to employment in the Netherlands in any work. Citizens of other countries must already have a valid residence permit (not visitor visa) to work legally in the sex trade as work permits are not issued for the jobs.

TAMPEP research into the origin of migrant sex workers records 60% of workers in the Netherlands are foreign-born, with the highest proportion of these (43%) from elsewhere in Europe. This represents a decrease from 70% migrants in sex work as recorded in 2006. The report cites high internal mobility within the EU as the reason for this decrease.

In 2004, Amsterdam authorities commissioned research into pimping and human trafficking in Amsterdam. The Willem Plompe institution took up that job. The researchers, under the leadership of professor Frank Bovenkerk, found that women under the control of a pimp can be easily put to work in the legal brothels with the brothel owners being aware that the women are controlled by pimps. The general setup of window prostitution was said to be helpful to pimps, as it facilitates the direct control of the women by their pimp.

A Christian organization of aid workers named the 'Scharlaken Koord' (in English, Scarlet Cord) has set up a special 'pal'-program for prostitutes in which the pals help the women build a new social network.

In September 2007, the city council of Amsterdam at the behest of mayor Job Cohen, concerned about trafficking and pimping in the area, forced the owner Charlie Geerts to close 51 prostitution windows, reducing the total number of windows in De Wallen by a third. Amsterdam authorities bought 18 properties from Geerts, with the aim of developing the area with fashion designers and other upscale businesses.

Mariska Majoor of the Prostitution Information Center and representatives of the sex workers' rights group The Red Thread (De Rode Draad) have decried the decision, claiming it would not reduce crime but would only lead to higher rent and more competition for the remaining windows.

In January 2008, the city council announced plans to close the Rosso live sex theatre and the Banana bar strip club in the area. Local business owners formed the group "Platform 1012" (named after the zip code of the area) to oppose the efforts of the Amsterdam government. Ultimately, the actions of the city government resulted in the closure of the Yab Yum brothel.

At the end of 2008, mayor Job Cohen announced plans to close half of the city's 400 prostitution windows, as well as some of the city's 70 cannabis cafes and sex clubs, because of suspected criminal gang activity, stating,: "It is not that we want to get rid of our red-light district. We want to reduce it. Things have become unbalanced and if we do not act we will never regain control".

In 2009, the Dutch justice ministry announced plans to close 320 prostitution "windows" from Amsterdam.

Karina Schaapman, a former Amsterdam prostitute who is now a city councilor said, "There are people who are really proud of the red light district as a tourist attraction. It's supposed to be such a wonderful, cheery place that shows just what a free city we are. But I think it's a cesspit. There's a lot of serious criminality. There's a lot of exploitation of women, and a lot of social distress. That's nothing to be proud of."

But in 2013 Metje Blaak, who worked in the sex trade for 25 years before turning to filmmaking, says closing legal brothels will push women out onto the streets, explaining, "In the window is safe, open. You can see your clients. You can see everything."

=== 2019 ===
In July 2019, more than ten years after Asscher's efforts to bring change to the Red Light District, Mayor Femke Halsema announced a different approach.

She proposed several different options for residents, sex workers, business owners and everyone else involved. A report called "The Future of Window Prostitution in Amsterdam" outlined four changes to the district that would become under serious consideration. "We must dare to think big – also about ending prostitution in the Red Light District", said Mayor Femke Halsema. "Unacceptable situations have arisen, and the council is ready to consider far-reaching solutions."

The Red Light District, in general, has been controversial since its existence. The internal struggles have differed from the desire to increase inclusion & LGBTQ+ influence into the district & therefore promote safe sex work for all types of people & all types of identities, to those who want to end sex work in general. Some argue that sex work is the reason for Amsterdam's rising sex trafficking issues. According to a 2019 article representing this problem, no one is aware just how many women are in the industry, and it is described as a "dark number". They also say that many of these girls are doing so against their will: "Some researchers say 4,000, others say 8,000. Some say 10% are trafficked, others say 90%. Even with that lowest figure, 400 girls are selling sex against their will." It raises questions about whether or not it is a positive idea to try to bring different types of people into an industry that keeps a lot in the dark.

== See also ==
- Hash, Marihuana & Hemp Museum
- Prostitution in the Netherlands
