= Oudekerksplein =

Square in Amsterdam, Netherlands

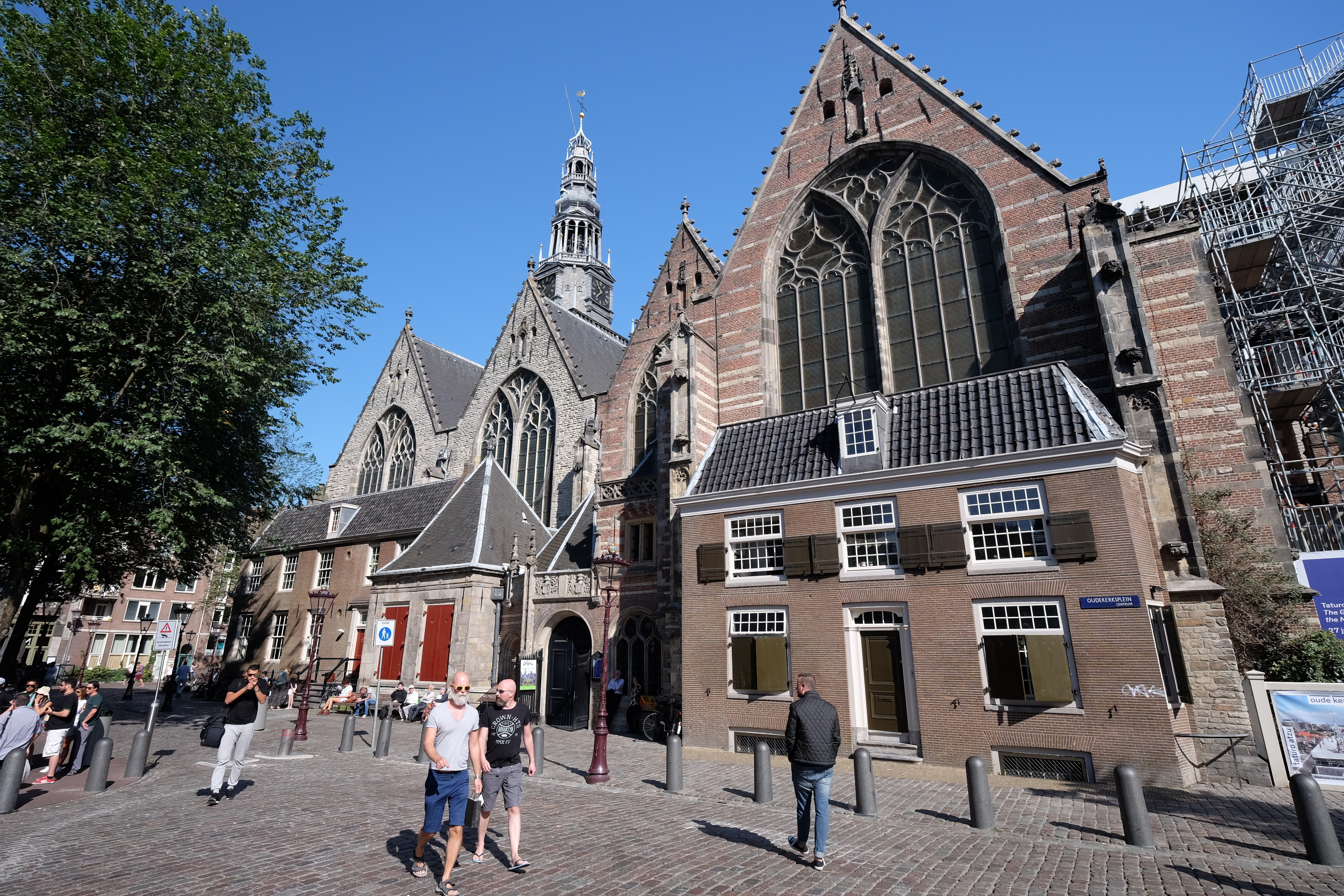
- The square with the Oude Kerk in 2015

- Location within Amsterdam
- Namesake: Oude Kerk
- Location: Centrum, Amsterdam, Netherlands
- Nearest metro station: Nieuwmarkt
- Coordinates: 52°22′27″N 4°53′52″E

The Oudekerksplein (English: Old Church's Square) is a square in the centre of Amsterdam. It is named after the 14th-century church Oude Kerk which dominates the square. The Oudekerksplein is wedged between the Warmoesstraat street and Oudezijds Voorburgwal canal. From the square, the Oudekerksbrug bridge crosses the Oudezijds Voorburgwal canal and continues eastwards, through the Oudekennissteeg and Molensteeg alleys, towards the Oudezijds Achterburgwal and Zeedijk.

Originally the Oudekerksplein was a graveyard. In 1655, the graveyard was cleared and moved to a new location beyond the city limits, creating the present square.

The Oudekerksplein lies at the heart of the red-light district of De Wallen. Along the square are some 35 windows from behind which prostitutes offer their services. As part of the so-called Project 1012 (first presented in 2007), the Amsterdam city government is trying to reduce the number of prostitutes on Oudekerksplein. The city wants to remove all brothels from the square and replace them with restaurants, shops, artists' workshops, and such. As part of the plans, the cannabis coffee shop on Oudekerksplein would also be closed. In March 2019, it was announced that the city is to ban guided tours of the red-light district from January 2020. There are reported to be over 1,000 such tours passing through Oudekerksplein each week.

A statue titled "Belle", honouring the prostitutes of the world, was placed on the square in 2007. The plaque on this statue reads (in English): "Respect sex workers all over the world". The street also has a bronze relief of a hand caressing a female breast. The sculpture was set in the cobblestone in February 1993 by an anonymous artist.

The 1968 Dutch documentary film Rondom het Oudekerksplein ("Around the Oudekerksplein") gave an impression of what life in the red-light district was like in the 1960s.

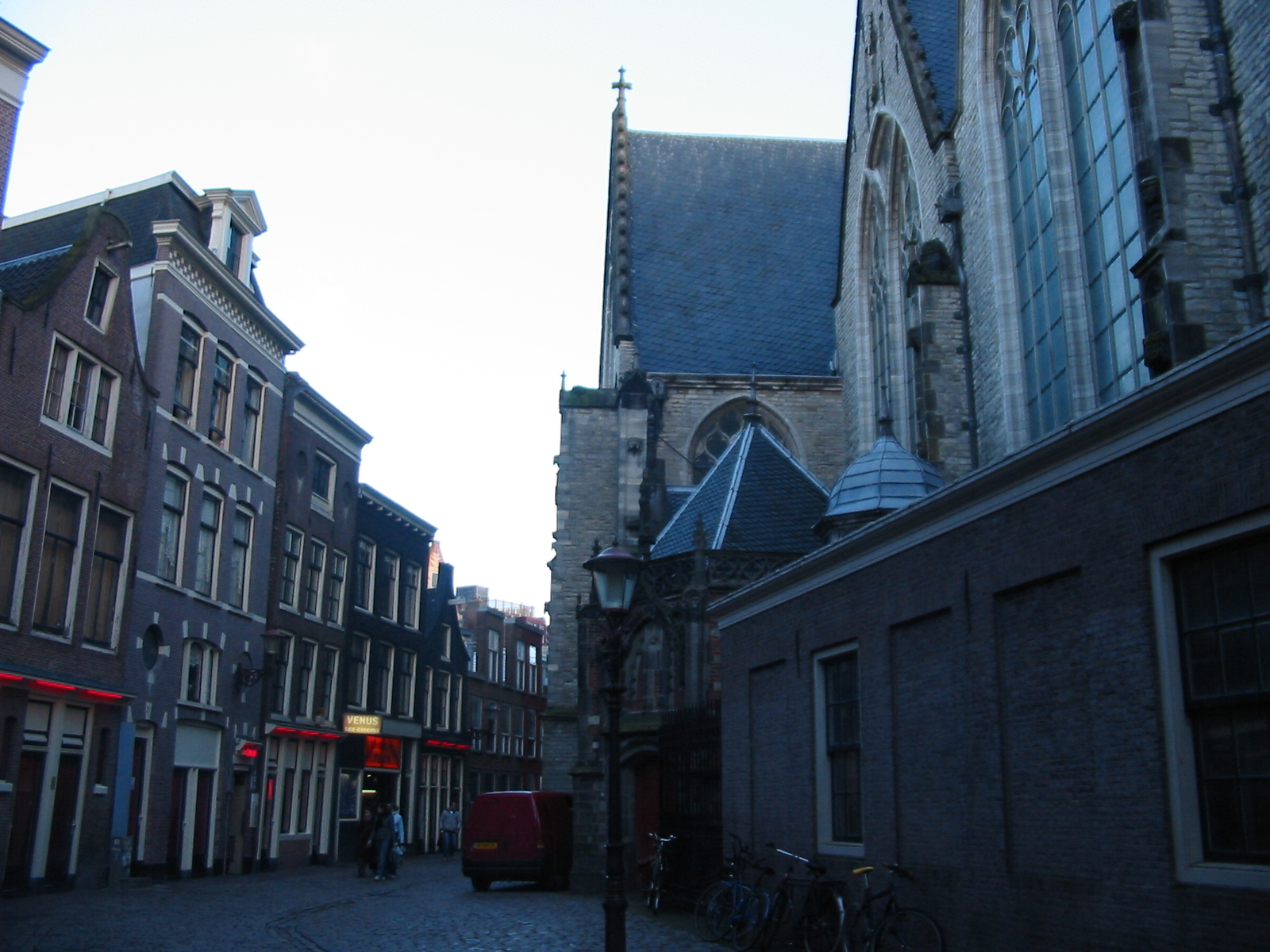
Oudekerksplein

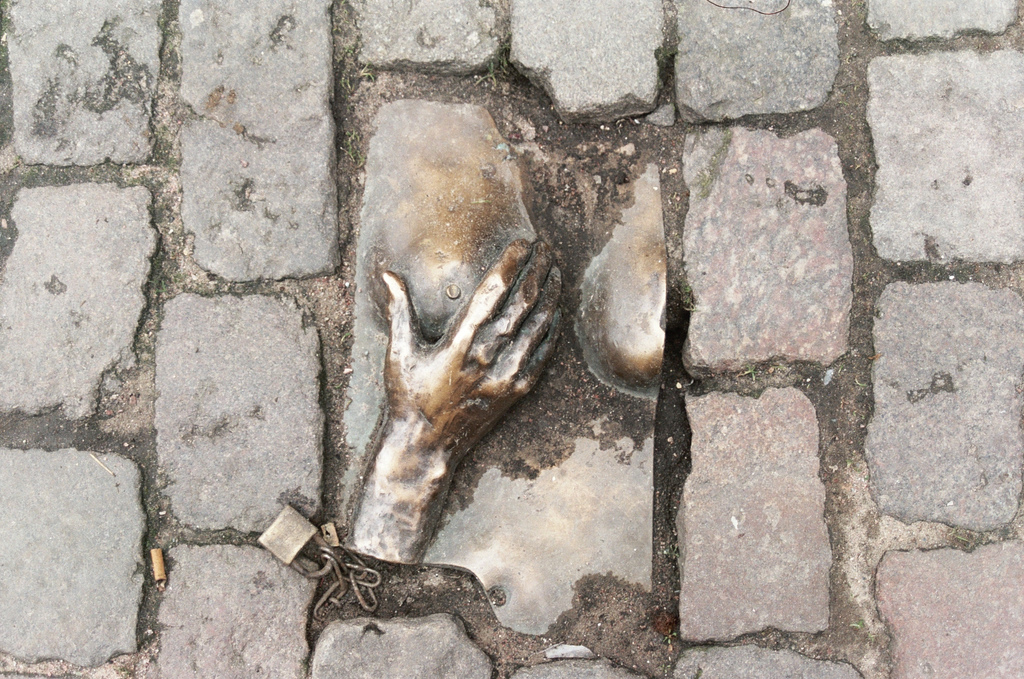
Relief by anonymous artist on the Oudekerksplein

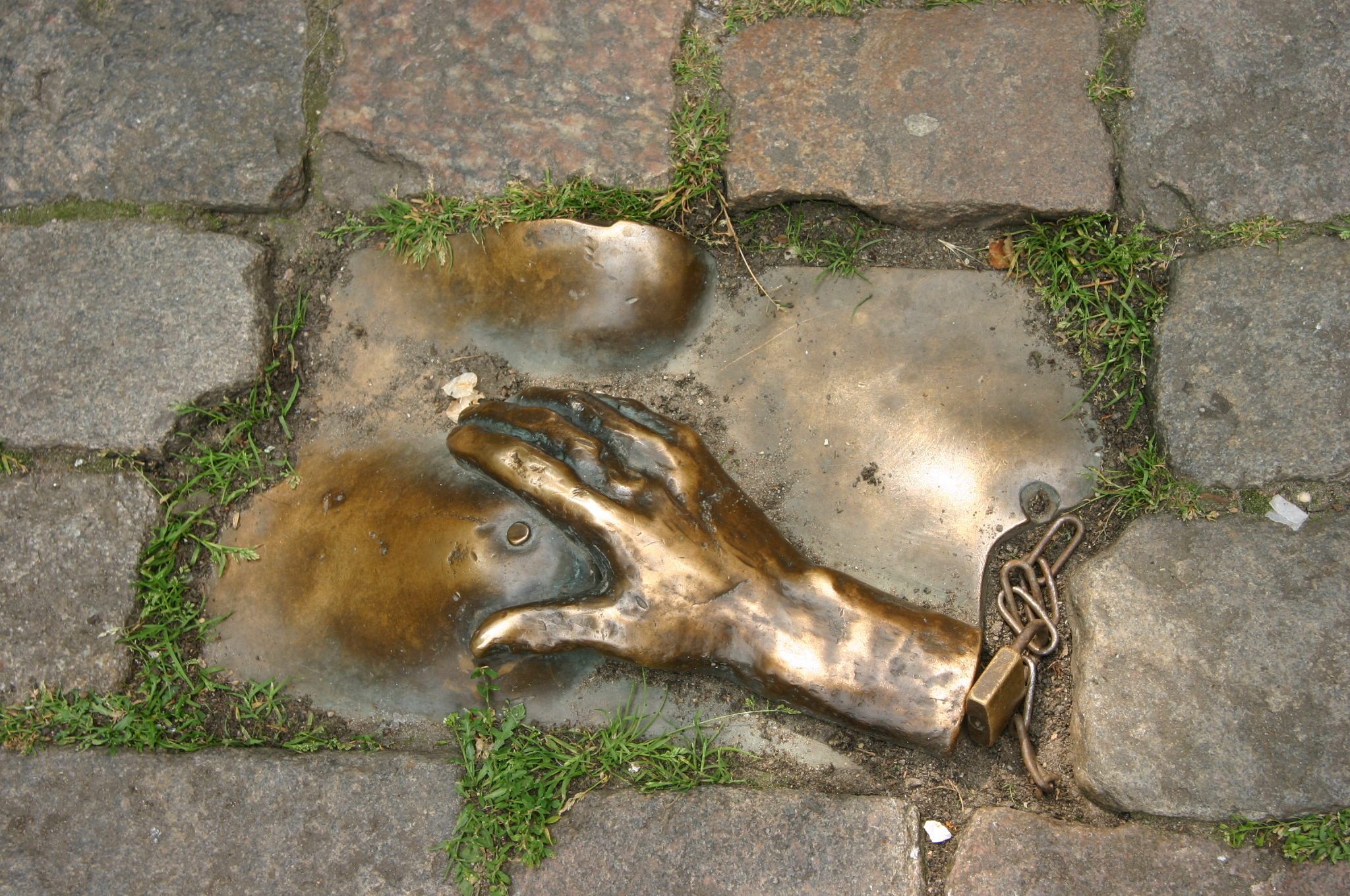
The same sculpture

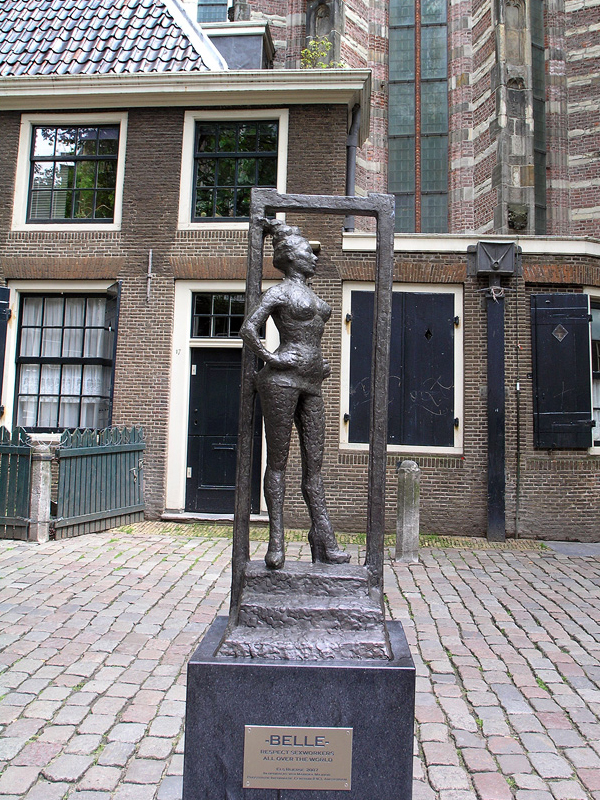
The statue "Belle", the plaque reads: "Respect sex workers all over the world."
