= ELS =

ELS or Els may refer to:

== Education ==
- Emerson Literary Society, a social society at Hamilton College
- Empirical legal studies
- English Language School, Dubai
- Europeesche Lagere School, a school system in the colonial Dutch East Indies
- Expeditionary learning schools, in the United States

== Medicine and science ==
- Early Life Stage test, a chronic toxicity test
- Eaton–Lambert syndrome, a muscle disease
- Editor in the Life Sciences, a professional certification
- ELS cotton (Gossypium barbadense), a species of cotton
- Encyclopedia of Life Sciences, an online encyclopedia

== People ==
- Els (given name), a feminine given name short for Elisabeth
- Ernie Els (born 1969), South African golfer
- Jurie Els, South African singer

== Technology ==
- Effortless loading system, proprietary name for a Tip-up barrel on offer from Beretta in models such as the Beretta 30X
- Electrophoretic light scattering
- Engineered Lifting Systems & Equipment, a Canadian manufacturing company
- Ensemble de Lancement Soyouz, a launch pad at Guiana Space Centre
- Extreme Loading for Structures, structural analysis software
- Emergency Light System, emergency lighting installed on emergency vehicles

== Other uses ==
- Els (Streu), a river in Germany
- El Salvador, UNDP country code
- East London Airport, in South Africa
- Edinburgh Labour Students, a student wing of the Labour Party of the United Kingdom
- Elsternwick railway station, Melbourne
- Equidistant letter sequence, a bible code method
- Escanaba and Lake Superior Railroad, in the United States
- Evangelical Lutheran Synod, a US-based Protestant Christian denomination
- Liberation Army of the South (Spanish: Ejército Libertador del Sur), an armed group active during the Mexican Revolution
