= Amsterdam-Centrum =

Coordinates: 52°22′23″N 4°53′32″E

- Borough of Amsterdam
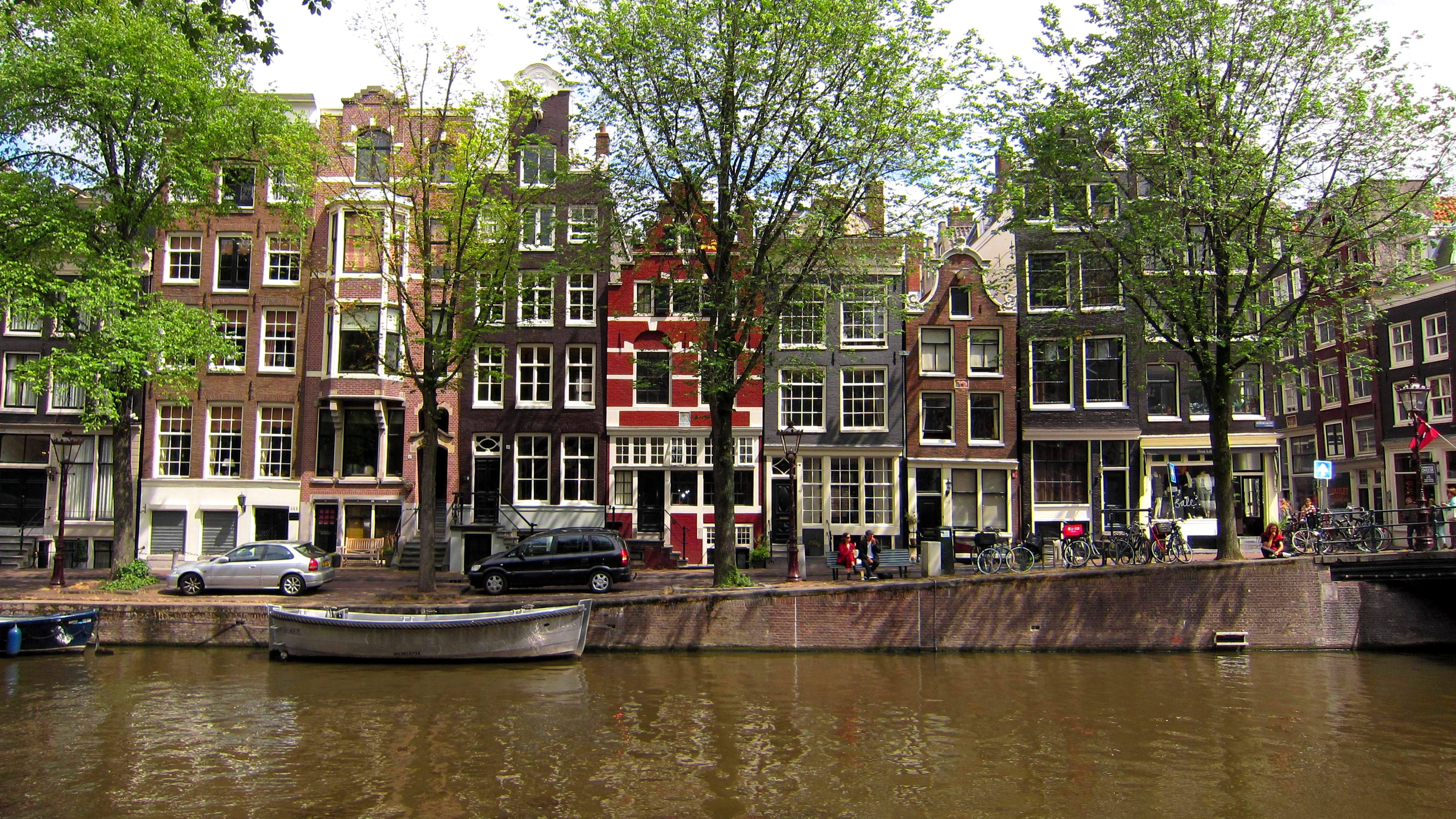
- Amsterdam's Grachtengordel, listed as a UNESCO World Heritage Site since 2010

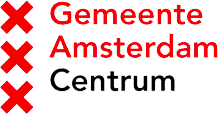
- Brandmark

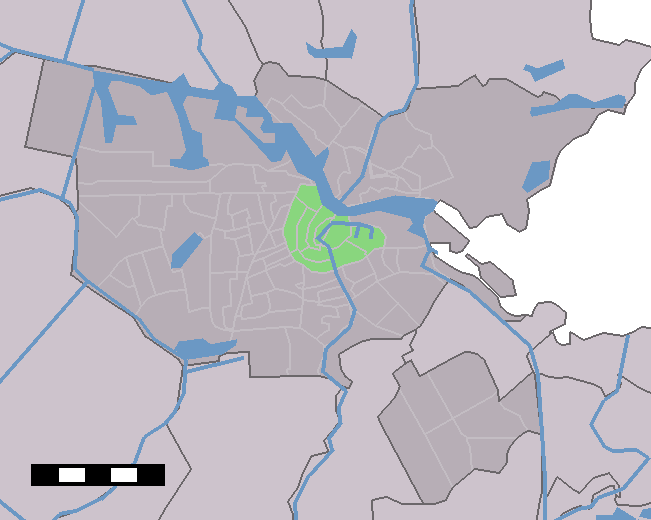
- Amsterdam-Centrum (green) as part of Amsterdam
- Country: Netherlands
- Province: North Holland
- Municipality: Amsterdam

Area
  - Total: 8.04 km^{2} (3.10 sq mi)

Population (1 January 2019)
  - Total: 86,862
  - Density: 10,800/km^{2} (28,000/sq mi)
- Time zone: UTC+1 (CET)
- Area code: 020
- Website: https://www.amsterdam.nl/stadsdelen/centrum/

Amsterdam-Centrum is the inner-most borough and historical city centre of Amsterdam, Netherlands, containing the majority of the city's landmarks. Established in 2002, Amsterdam-Centrum was the last area in the city to be granted the status of self-governing borough. The borough is 8.04 km^{2} and covers the UNESCO-listed Amsterdam canal belt. In 2013, the borough had approximately 85,000 inhabitants, who on average had the second-highest income per household in the city (after Amsterdam-Zuid) and one of the highest in the country.

== Neighborhoods ==
Amsterdam-Centrum consists of fourteen neighborhoods: Binnenstad (comprising the Burgwallen Oude Zijde and Burgwallen Nieuwe Zijde areas), Grachtengordel (including the Negen Straatjes district), Haarlemmerbuurt, Jodenbuurt, Jordaan, Kadijken, Lastage, Oosterdokseiland, Oostelijke Eilanden (including the Czaar Peterbuurt), Plantage, Rapenburg, Uilenburg, Westelijke Eilanden and Weteringschans.

Neighborhoods are largely traditional divisions of the inner city rather than strictly defined administrative units; as such, they have no level of autonomy, administrative privileges or governing bodies of their own.

== Borough government ==
Until 2014, the Amsterdam boroughs, called stadsdelen (also known as urban districts in English), were governed by a directly elected district council (deelraad) as well as a separate district executive board, the members of which were appointed and controlled by the council. Since the 2014 municipal elections, the district councils have been abolished and replaced by smaller, but still directly elected district committees (bestuurscommissies). The district committees are elected every four years, on the same day as the city's central municipal council. Each district committee elects three of its members to form an executive committee (dagelijks bestuur). The district committees' jurisdiction is determined by the central municipal council. Responsibilities delegated to the 2014 district committees include parks and recreation, streets and squares, refuse collection, permits and events, preparation of zoning plans, passports and drivers licenses, and welfare work.

The former district council of Amsterdam-Centrum originally had 27 members but was enlarged in 2006 with two extra members. The last district executive board president was Jeanine van Pinxteren (GL, 2010–2014), who succeeded Els Iping (PvdA, 2006–2010) and Anne Lize van der Stoel (VVD, 2002–2006).

District council seats
| | PvdA | VVD | GL | SP | D66 | AA/DG | Opheffen.nu | CDA | Mokum Mobiel | Total |
| 2002 | 7 | 7 | 6 | – | 3 | 2 | – | 1 | 1 | 27 |
| 2006 | 7 | 6 | 6 | 5 | 2 | 2 | 1 | – | – | 29 |
| 2010 | 5 | 6 | 8 | 3 | 7 | – | – | – | – | 29 |

The new district committee of Amsterdam-Centrum consists of 13 members. It was elected on 19 March 2014 with five national political parties represented in the committee. On 7 April 2014, the committee elected its executive board. Executive committee chair was Boudewijn Oranje (D66), and the other members were Jeanine van Pinxteren (GL) and Roeland Rengelink (PvdA).

For the period 2018-2022 is Dehlia Timman (succeeded Mascha ten Bruggencate in July 2021) chair (both D66), the two other members are Micha Vos and Ilse Griek (both GreenLeft).

District committee seats
| | GL | D66 | VVD | PvdA | SP | Total |
| 2014 | ? | ? | ? | ? | ? | 8 |
| 2018 | 3 | 2 | 2 | 1 | – | 8 |

The borough office (Dutch: stadsdeelkantoor; English: district office; also known as stadsloket in Dutch) of Amsterdam-Centrum is located at the central city hall, housed in the Stopera building.

== Landmarks ==
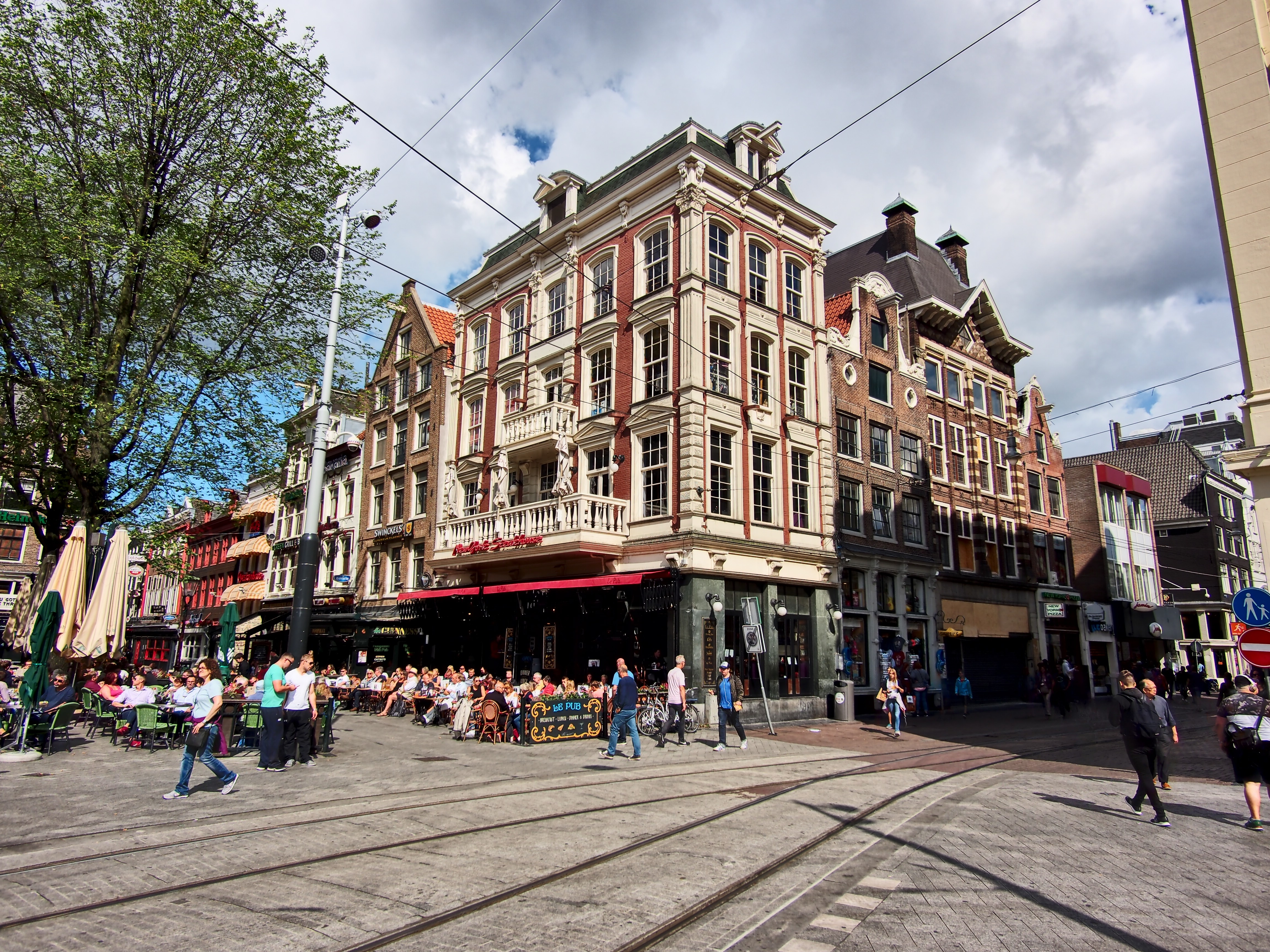
Leidseplein, Weteringschans

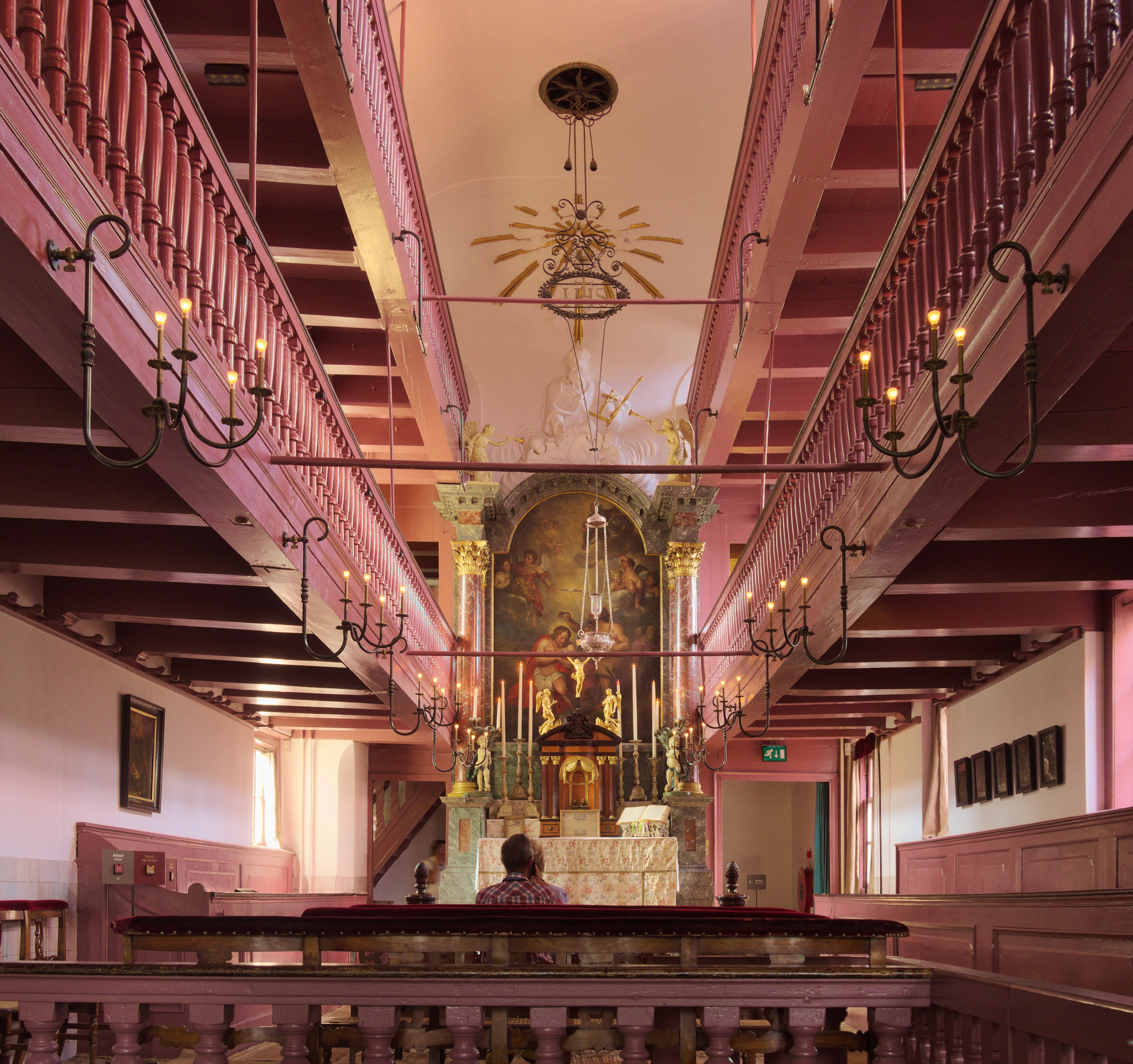
Ons' Lieve Heer op Solder, Burgwallen Oude Zijde

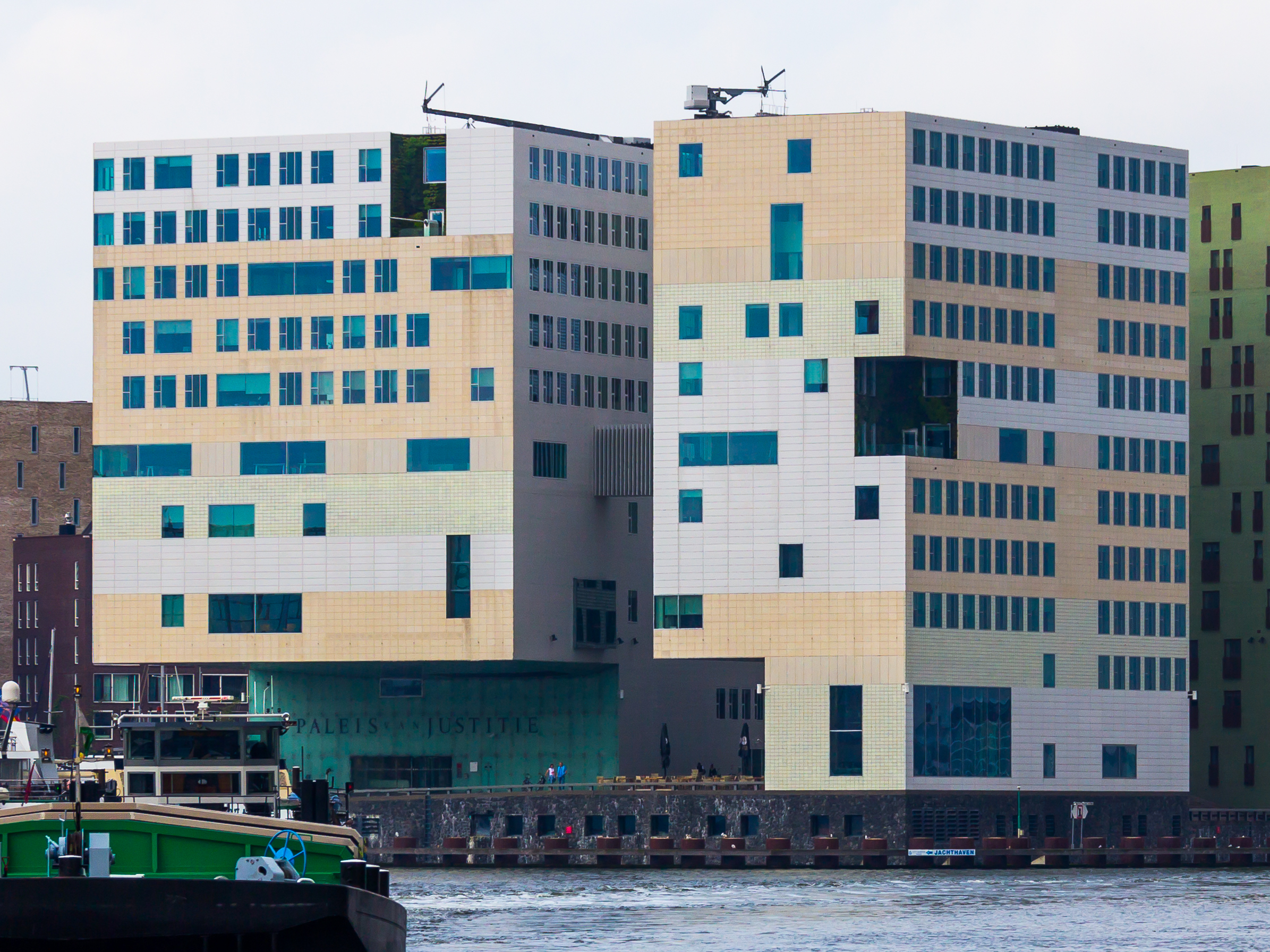
Paleis van Justitie seen from the north, Haarlemmerbuurt

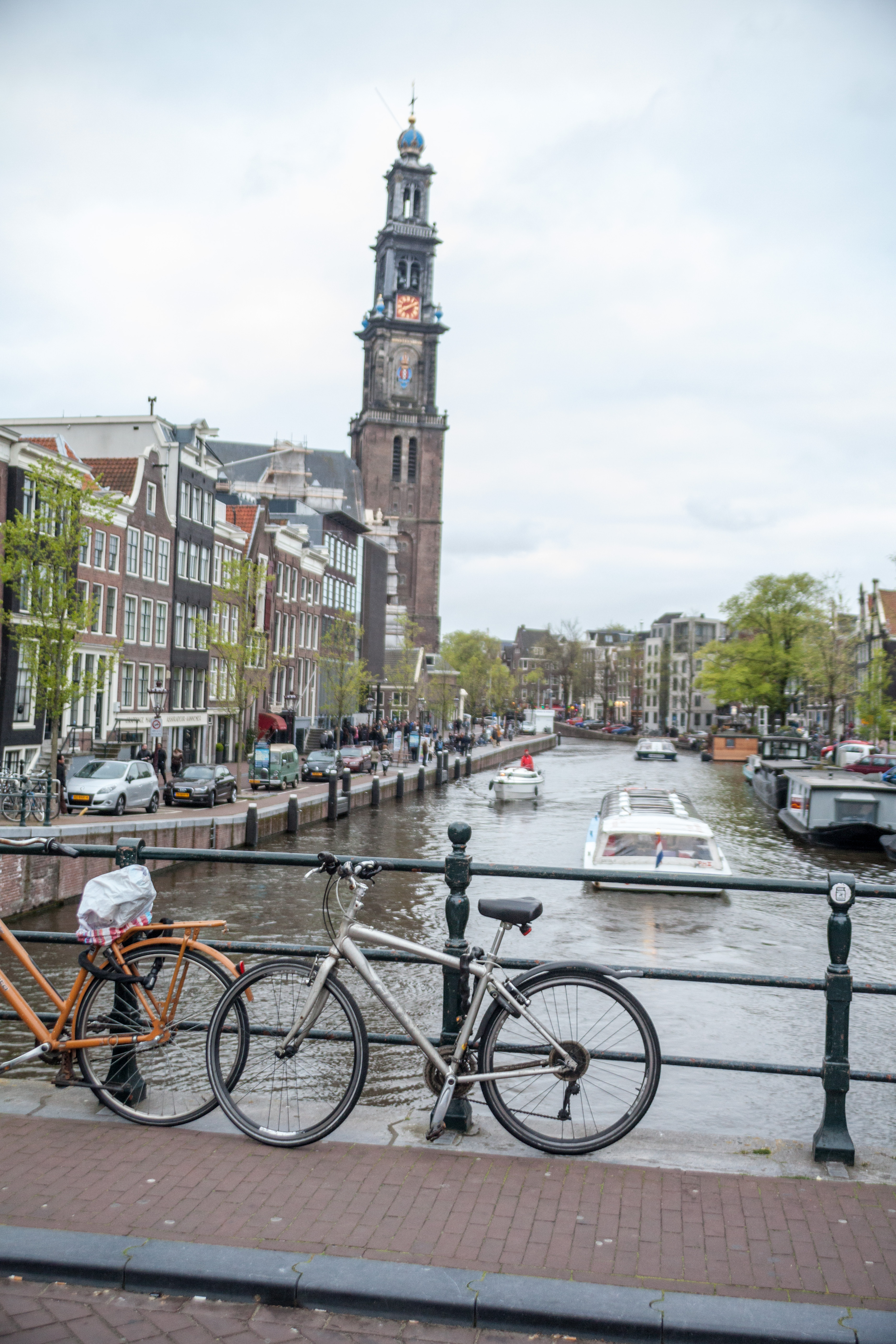
Westerkerk and Prinsengracht, Grachtengordel

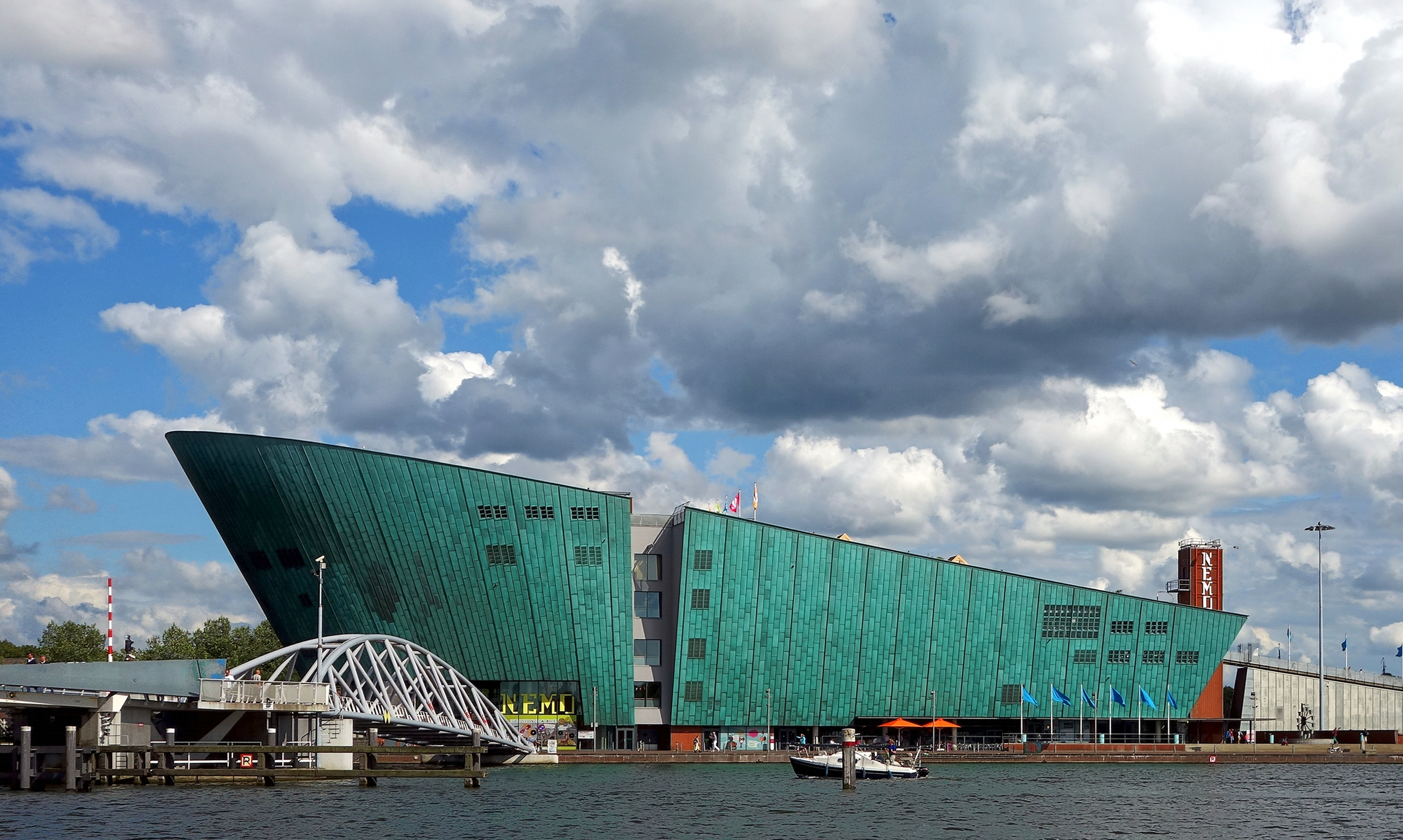
NEMO Science Museum, Oosterdokseiland
