= Els (given name) =

Els is a Dutch-language feminine given name, usually a short form of Elisabeth. People with the name include

- Els Aarne (1917–1995), Estonian composer and pedagogue
- Els Beerten (born 1959), Flemish writer of children's literature
- Els Belmans (born 1983), Belgian track cyclist
- Els Bongers (born c.1966), Dutch soprano
- Els Borst (1932–2014), Dutch government minister
- Els van Breda Vriesman (born 1942), Dutch sports executive
- Els Callens (born 1970), Belgian tennis player
- Els Coppens-van de Rijt (born 1943), Dutch artist and author
- Els de Schepper (born 1965), Flemish actress, comedian and writer
- Els De Temmerman (born 1962), Belgian journalist
- Els Decottenier (born 1968), Belgian racing cyclist
- Els Demol (born 1958), Belgian politician
- Els Dietvorst, Belgian artist, filmmaker and shepherd
- Els van Doesburg (born 1989), Dutch-Belgian politician
- Els Dottermans (born 1964), Belgian actress
- Els von Eystett, 15th-century German prostitute
- Els Goulmy (born 1946), Dutch biologist
- Els de Groen (1949–2025), Dutch author and politician
- Els van den Horn (1927–1996), Dutch diver
- Els Iping (born 1953), Dutch politician
- Els Mertens (born 1966), Belgian racing cyclist
- Els Moor (1937–2016), Dutch literary historian
- Els van Noorduyn (born 1946), Dutch shot putter
- Els Pelgrom (born 1934), Dutch children's writer
- Els Pynoo (born 1968), Belgian pop singer
- Els Rens (born 1983), Belgian long-distance runner
- Els Schelfhout (born 1967), Belgian politician
- Els Smekens (born 1986), Belgian dancer
- Els Vader (1959–2021), Dutch sprinter
- Els Vandesteene (born 1987), Belgian volleyball player
- Els Vanheusden, Belgian physician
- Els Witte (born 1941), Belgian historian

== Fiction ==
- Els, an angora goat and minor character in Beastars
