= Binnenstad, Amsterdam =

Coordinates: 52.372°N 4.896°E

Binnenstad
- Neighbourhood of Amsterdam
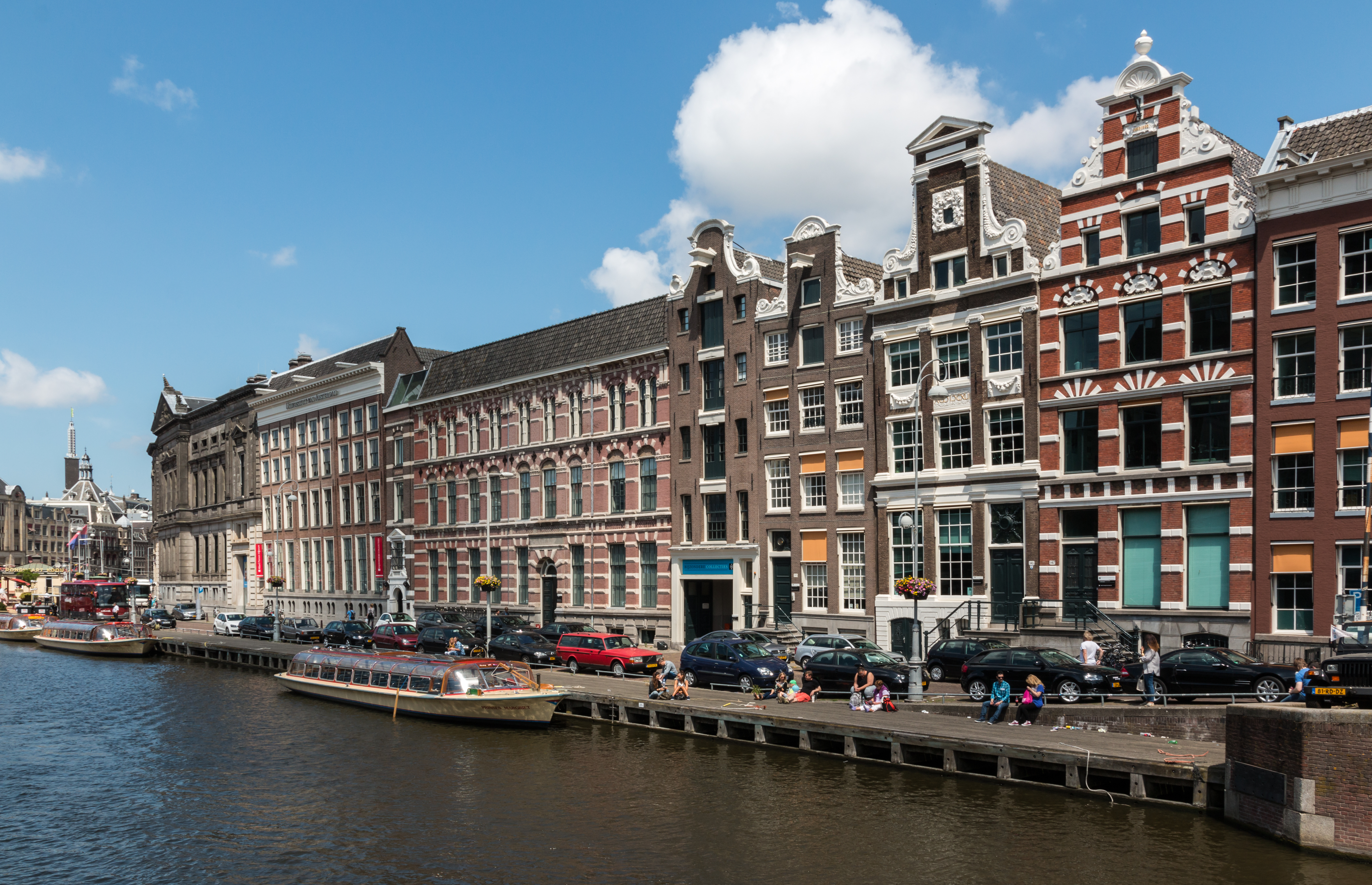
- View of the Rokin, Binnenstad

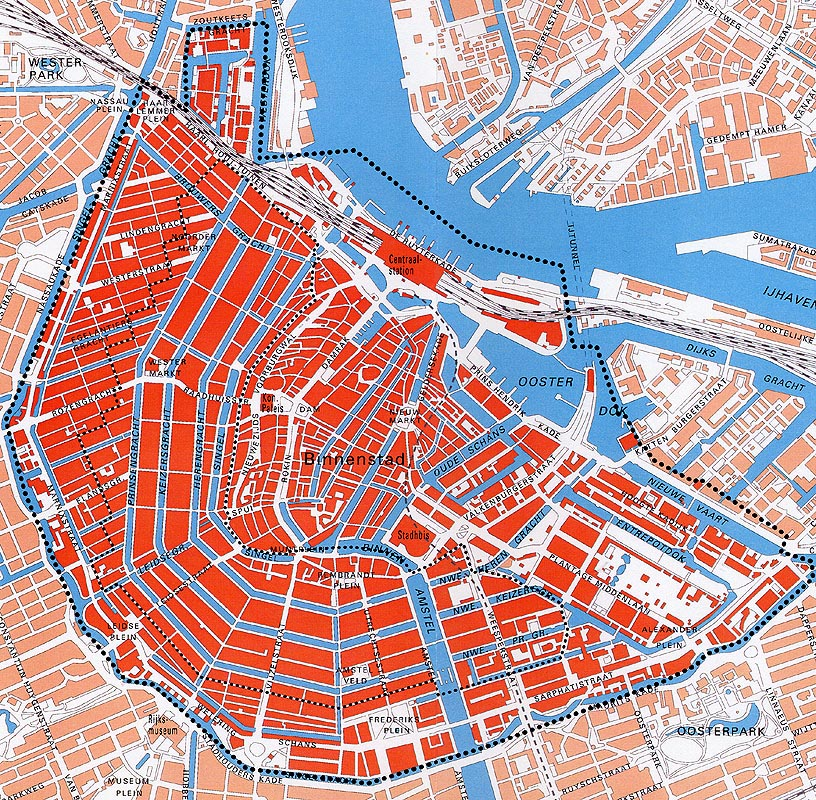
- Binnenstad is the part comprised between the Singel and Nieuwmarkt
- Country: Netherlands
- Province: North Holland
- Municipality: Amsterdam
- Borough: Centrum
- Time zone: UTC+1 (CET)

Binnenstad (English: Inner city) is a neighborhood of Amsterdam, Netherlands located in the Centrum borough. It is divided between the Burgwallen Oude Zijde (east) and Burgwallen Nieuwe Zijde (west) areas.

== Landmarks ==
It is the most central part of the municipality, comprising the Amsterdam Centraal station, Nieuwe Kerk, Basilica of St. Nicholas, Portuguese Synagogue, Waterlooplein, Openbare Bibliotheek Amsterdam, Dam Square, Begijnhof, Ons' Lieve Heer op Solder, Spui, Muntplein, Beurs van Berlage, Damrak, Oude Kerk, Magna Plaza and Royal Palace of Amsterdam.

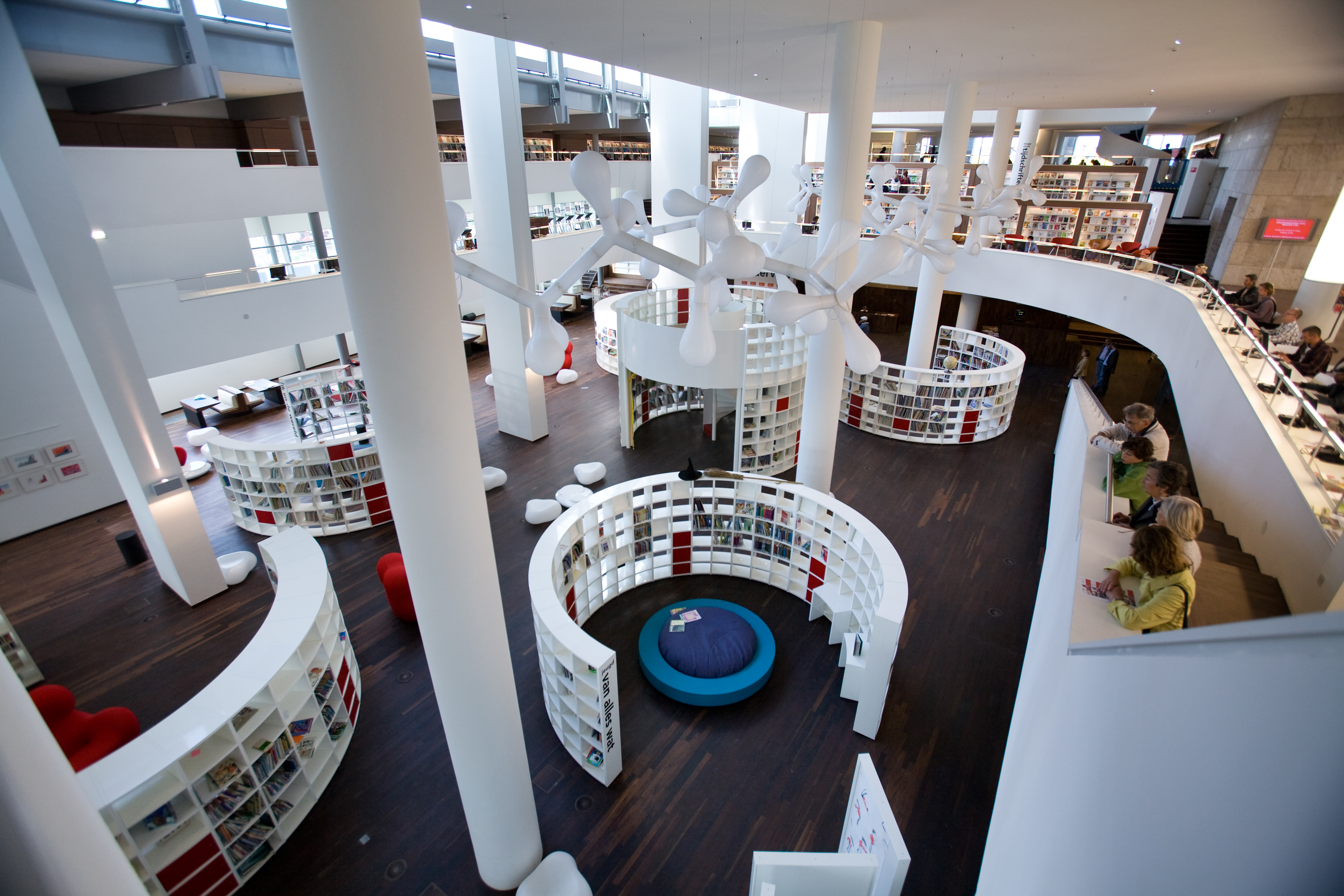
Openbare Bibliotheek Amsterdam

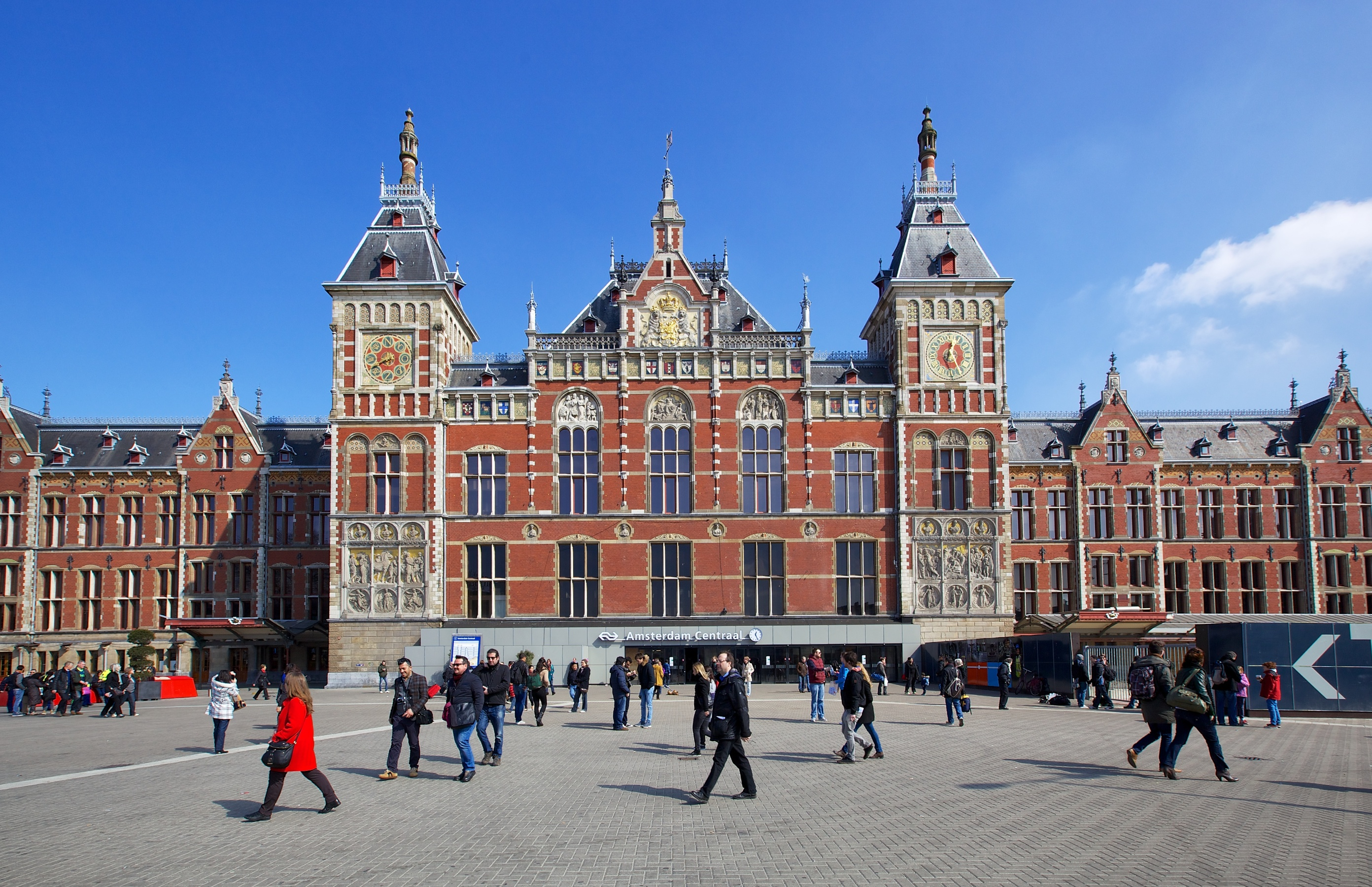
Amsterdam Centraal station

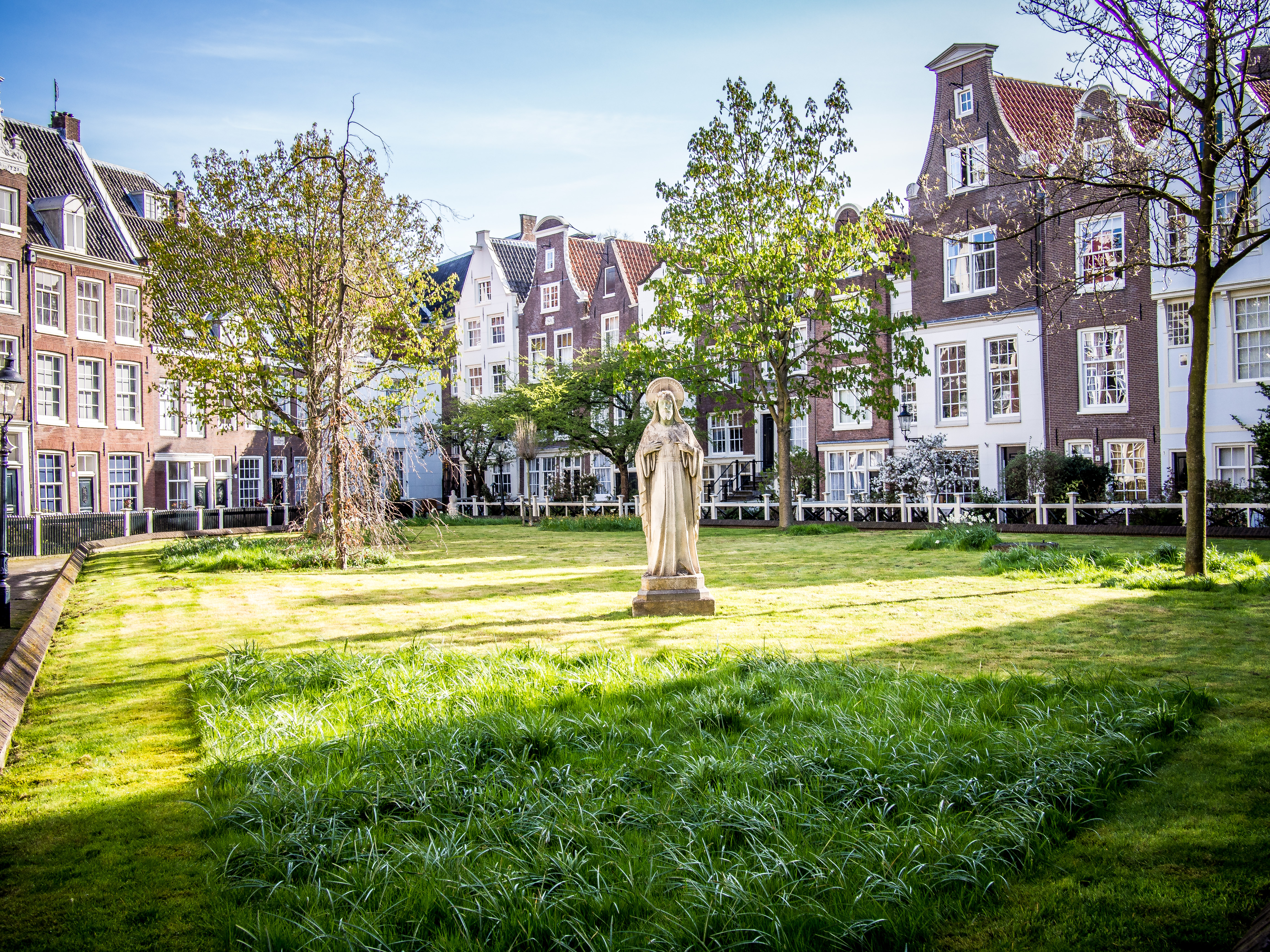
Begijnhof

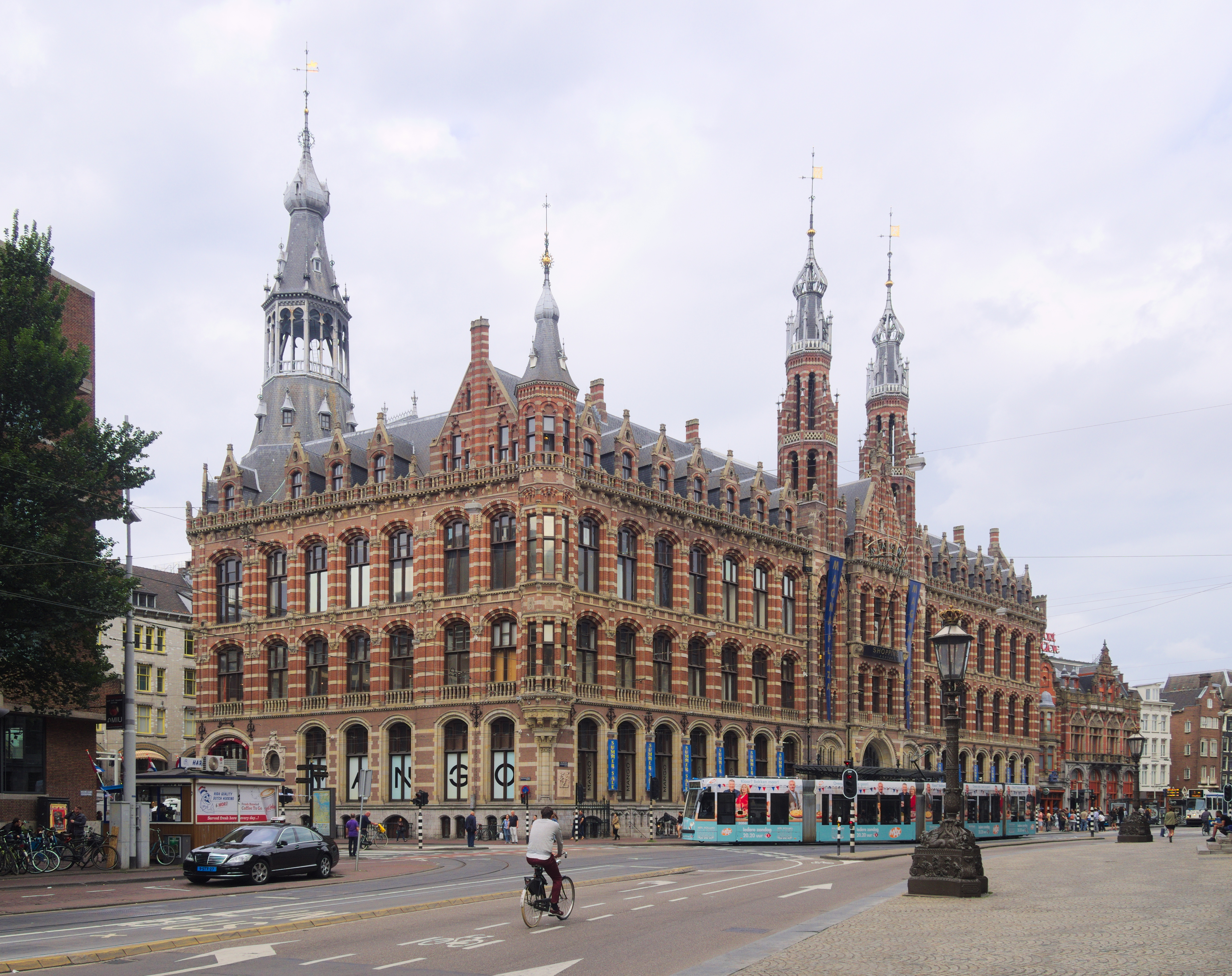
Magna Plaza
