= Van Heusden =

van Heusden or Vanheusden is a surname. Notable people with the surname include:

- Arjan van Heusden (born 1972), Dutch footballer
- Els Vanheusden, Belgian physician and businesswoman
- Wout van Heusden (1896–1982), Dutch graphic artist
- Zinho Vanheusden (born 1999), Belgian footballer
