= Negen Straatjes =

Coordinates: 52°22′12″N 4°53′09″E

- Neighborhood of Amsterdam
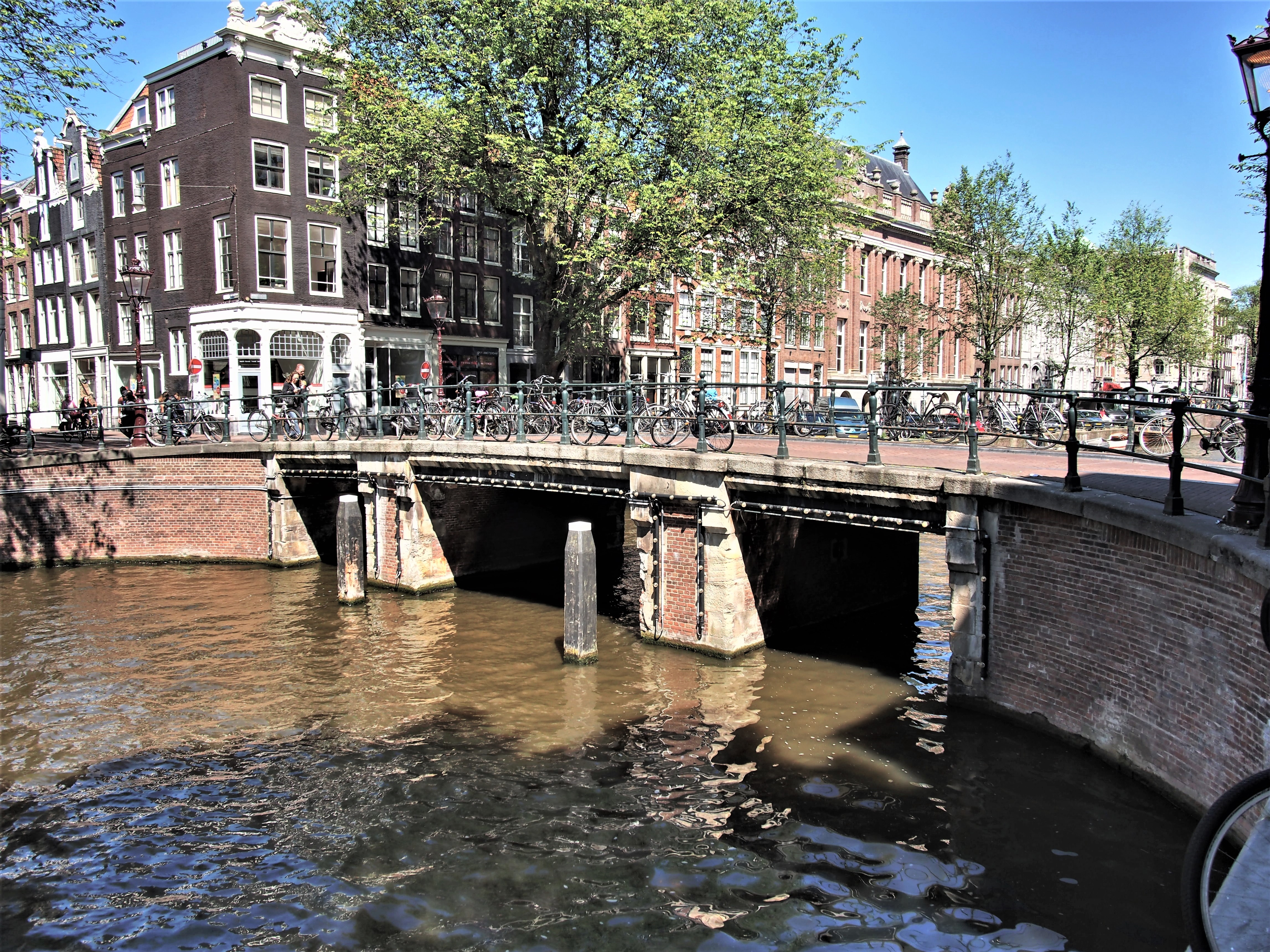
- Hartenstraat bridge over the Herengracht
- Interactive map of Negen Straatjes
- Country: Netherlands
- Province: North Holland
- COROP: Amsterdam
- Borough: Centrum
- Time zone: UTC+1 (CET)
- Area code: 1016
- Website: https://de9straatjes.nl/en/home

Negen Straatjes (Dutch pronunciation: [ˈneːɣə(n) ˈstraːtɕəs]; English: "Nine Little Streets") is a neighbourhood of Amsterdam, Netherlands located in the Grachtengordel, a UNESCO World Heritage Site.

== Overview ==
Negen Straatjes comprises nine side streets off the Prinsengracht, Keizersgracht, Herengracht and Singel in central Amsterdam which have been promoting themselves with that name since the 1990s. Together they form a sub-neighborhood within the larger western Grachtengordel (English: Canal Belt), one with many small and diverse shops and restaurants. The construction in this area goes back to the first half of the 17th century. Negen Straatjes is bordered on the north by the Raadhuisstraat and on the south by the Leidsegracht. In between, the Prinsengracht, Keizersgracht, Herengracht and Singel are intersected by three cross streets - but each of the cross streets has different names in each of its sections between the canals.

From the Prinsengracht towards the Singel and beginning with the northernmost streets, the streets are:

- Reestraat (English: Roe Deer Street) – Hartenstraat (English: Hearts Street) – Gasthuismolensteeg (English: Inn Mill Alley)
- Berenstraat (English: Bears Street) – Wolvenstraat (English: Wolves Street) – Oude Spiegelstraat (English: Old Mirror Street)
- Runstraat (English: Cow Street) – Huidenstraat (English: Skins or Pelts Street) – Wijde Heisteeg (English: Wide Heath Street)

The names are reminders of many of the types of work that were carried out here in centuries past, especially the processing of skins (cow, bear, wolf and roe deer skins).

Negen Straatjes
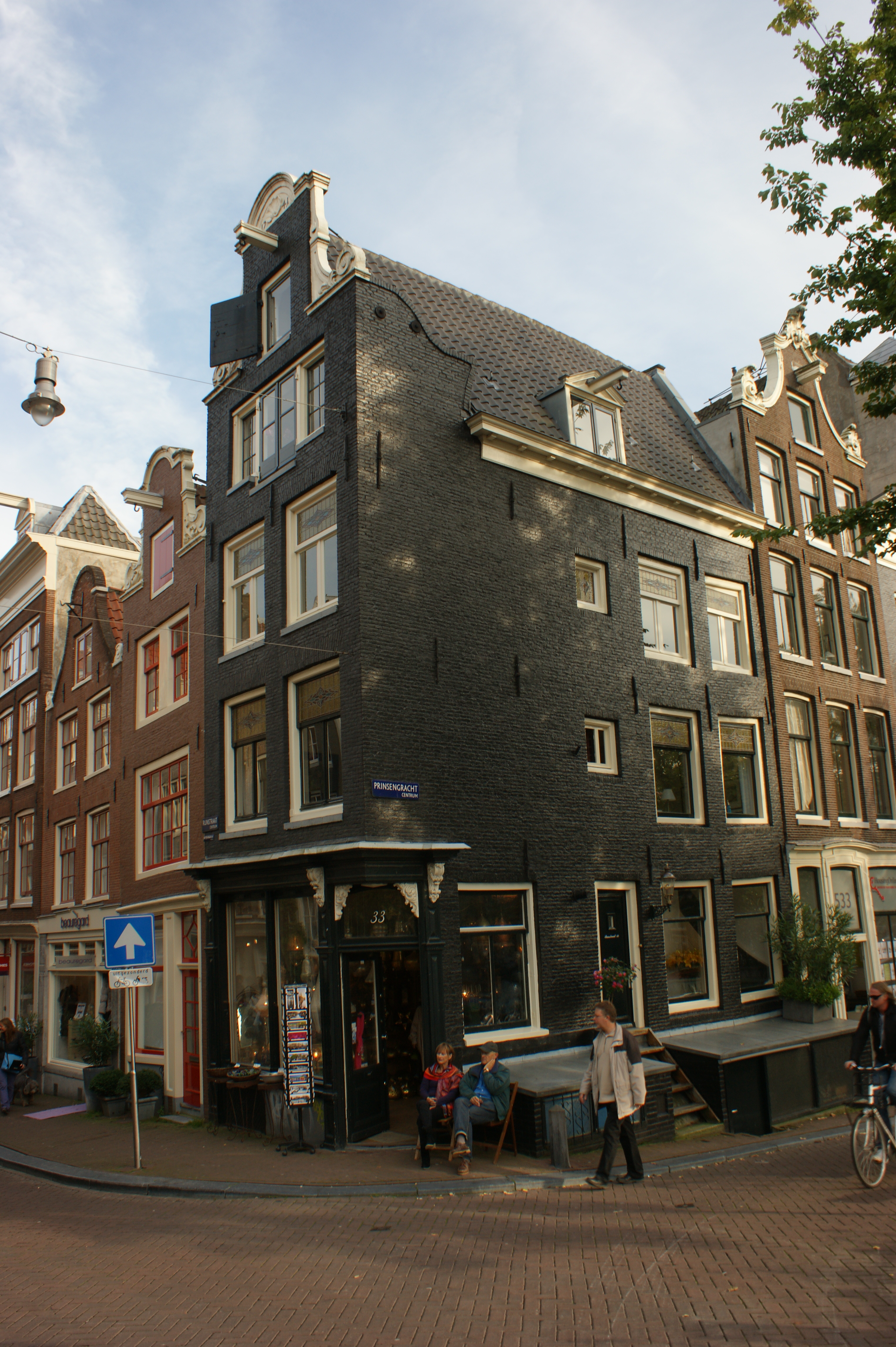
Runstraat and Prinsengracht, 2010

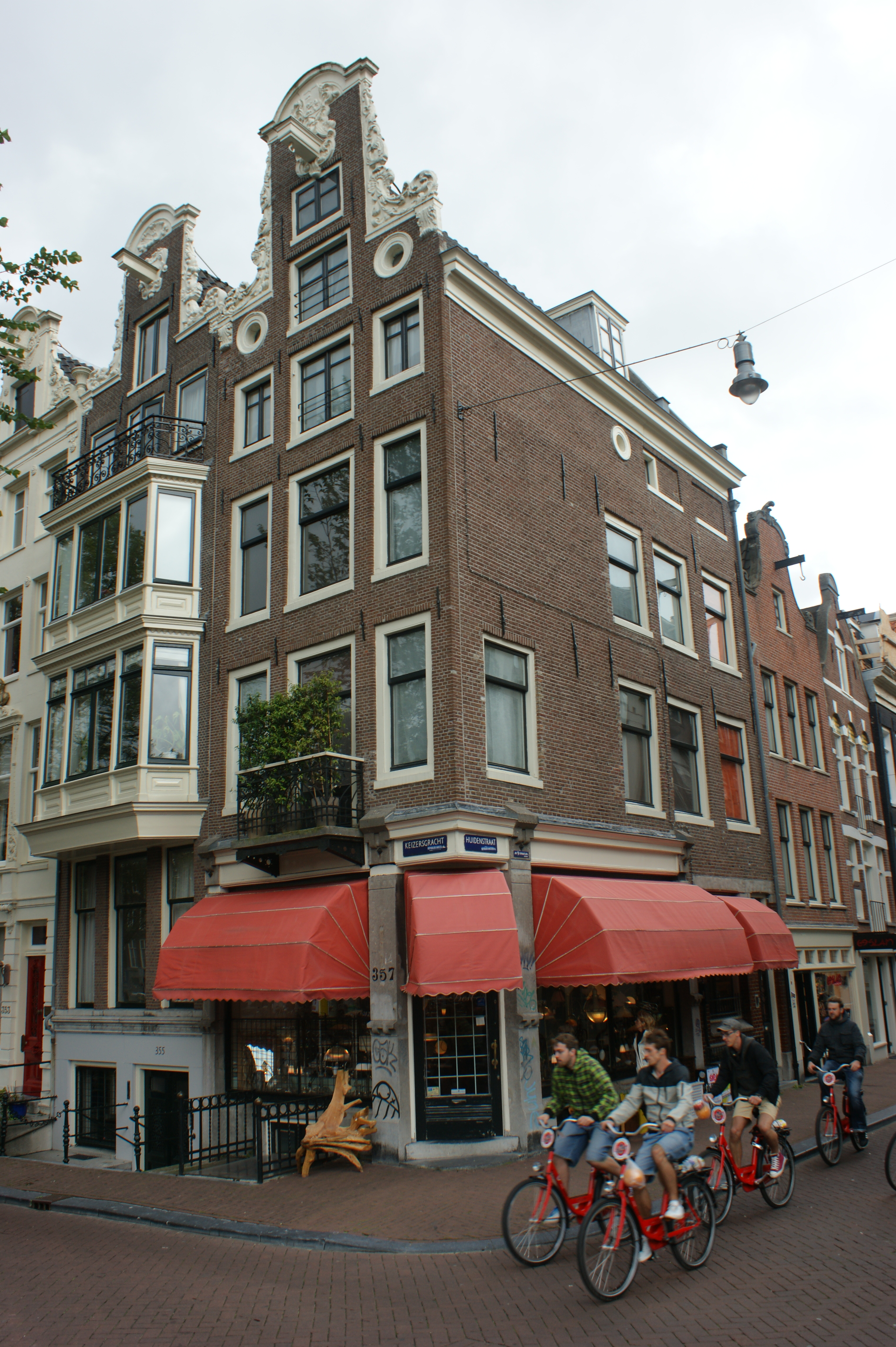
Keizersgracht and Huidenstraat, 2011

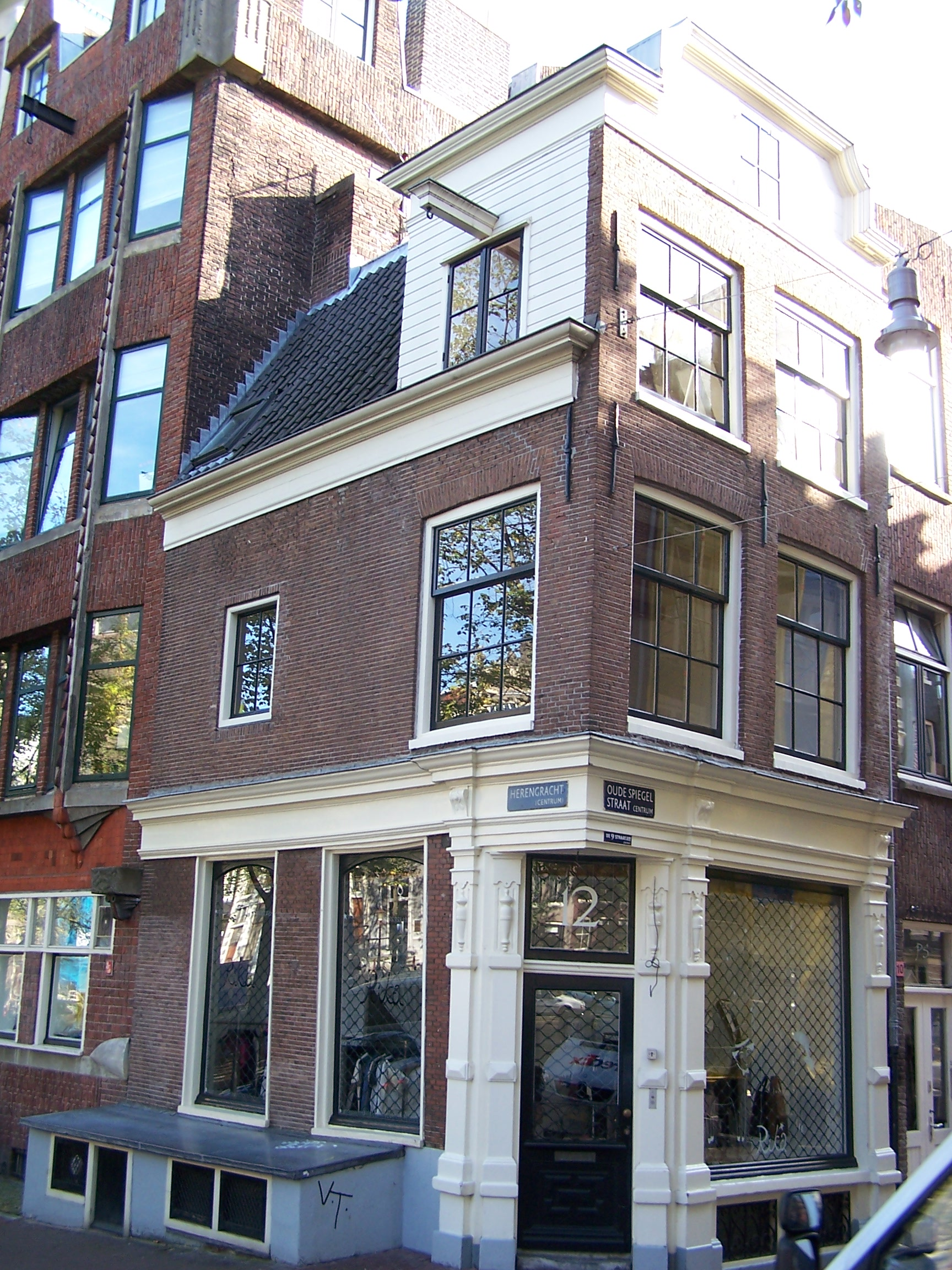
Herengracht and Oude Spiegelstraat, 2010

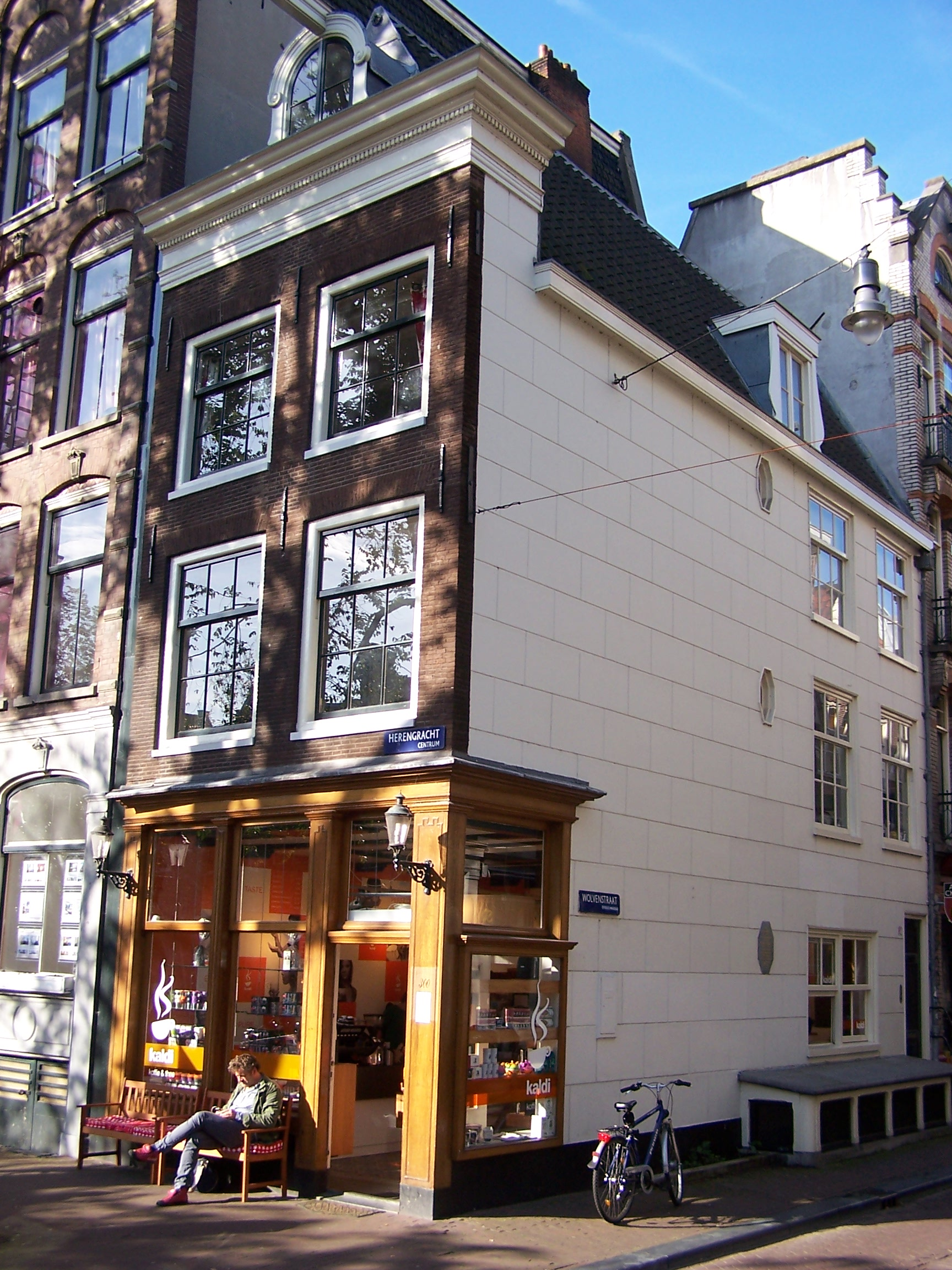
Herengracht and Wolvenstraat, 2011

== History ==
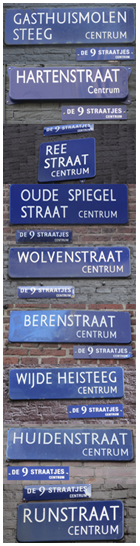
Signs from each of the nine streets

Until the end of the 16th century, the city of Amsterdam encompassed the area inside the Singel and what is now Kloveniersburgwal. After the Alteration and change in management, the city expanded in four stages between 1585 and 1665. Around 1612, during the Twelve Years' Truce, the third expansion of the city began with the reclamation of the Grachtengordel, including the area now known as Negen Straatjes, and the Jordaan between Brouwersgracht and Leidsegracht. The majority of the buildings in Negen Straatjes date from the 18th century, with little remaining of the original 17th century buildings. There are more than 140 national (Dutch: rijksmonument) and municipal monuments in Negen Straatjes.

The idea to promote the Negen Straatjes as a shopping area came from a few entrepreneurs, including Djoeke Wessing. They wanted a common name for the area and give it a kind of allure as the more notable nearby neighborhood of Jordaan. This would promote cooperation and business growth, but also attract more tourists to the hitherto relatively unknown area. The "Association of the 9 Streets" was founded on November 12, 1996.

In recent years, Hazenstraat, a side street off the Elandsgracht in the Jordaan, close to Negen Straatjes, has called itself the Tenth Street (Dutch: Tiende Straatje).

== Area attractions ==
- Het Grachtenhuis Museum at Herengracht 386
- Huis Marseille, Museum for Photography at Keizersgracht 401
- The European Center for Art, Culture and Science in the Felix Meritis house at Keizersgracht 324
- The NIOD Institute for War, Holocaust and Genocide Studies at Herengracht 380

The yearly Prinsengrachtconcert (English: Prince's canal concert) in August takes places at the corner of the Prinsengracht and the Reestraat at Pulitzer Amsterdam.
