= Het Nieuwe Huis =

Apartment building in Amsterdam

Coordinates: 52°21′9″N 4°52′56″E

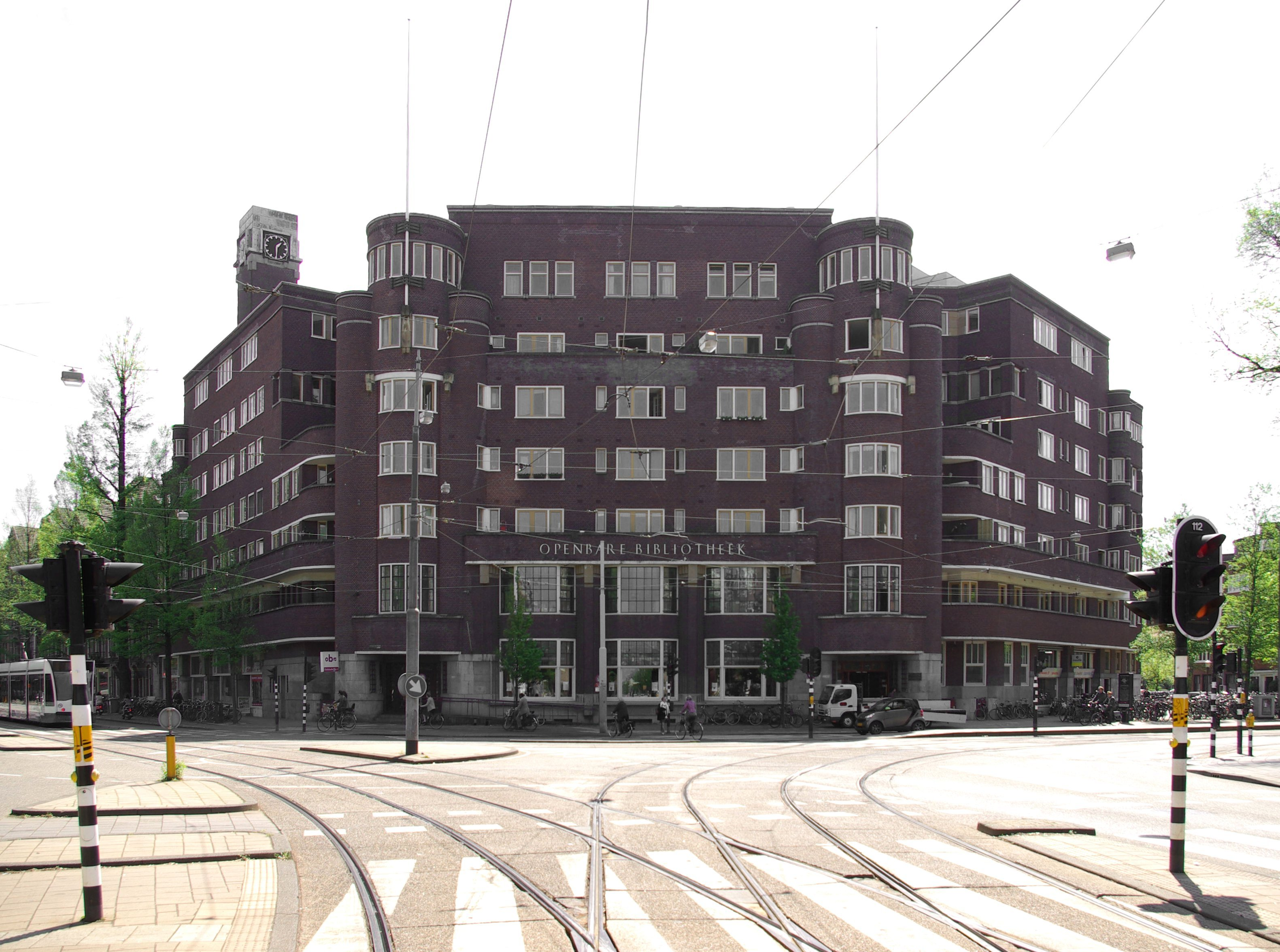
Het Nieuwe Huis in 2011

Het Nieuwe Huis (Eng: The New House) is an 'American style' apartment building with a gatehouse at the Roelof Hartplein, at the head of the Van Baerlestraat in Amsterdam Oud-Zuid within five minutes walking from the museums precinct. The building is, since 2004, on the country's monument list.

The building was designed by architect Barend van den Nieuwen Amstel. In 1928, it was established with the aim of housing wealthy bachelors, for whom it was more difficult to find a home than for families. The New House has 188 small to medium-sized apartments. Under the building is a branch of the Public Library of Amsterdam.

In 1974, the writer and poet Jan Arends committed suicide by jumping from the window of his apartment in the courtyard of The New House. On the day of his death he published his collection of poems Lunch Poems.

The playful facade with curves and staircase windows can be seen the influence of the Amsterdam School.

In 2015, the Het Nieuwe Huis still offers affordable accommodation for single people. The current residents are aged 21 to 99 and enjoy the central location as well as several communal areas such as the interior garden and on the 5th floor, a shared terrace with a view on the Amsterdam Business Center Zuid.
