= Rapenburg =

Neighborhood in Amsterdam, Netherlands

- Neighbourhood of Amsterdam
- Location within Amsterdam
- Coordinates: 52°22′16″N 04°54′32″E
- Country: Netherlands
- Province: North Holland
- Municipality: Amsterdam
- Borough: Amsterdam-Centrum

Area
  - Total: 0.09 km^{2} (0.035 sq mi)
- Elevation: 5 m (16 ft)

Population (2022)
  - Total: 990
  - Density: 11,000/km^{2} (28,000/sq mi)
- Time zone: UTC+1 (CET)

Rapenburg is a neighbourhood in Amsterdam, Netherlands. The main street is also called Rapenburg. Rapenburg is located in the centre of Amsterdam, on the northeastern side, close to the IJ. As of the year 2022, its population was 990.

Rapenburg was first built in the 1590s and was home to many shipmakers, due to its location near to the IJ and the River Amstel.

== Galleries ==
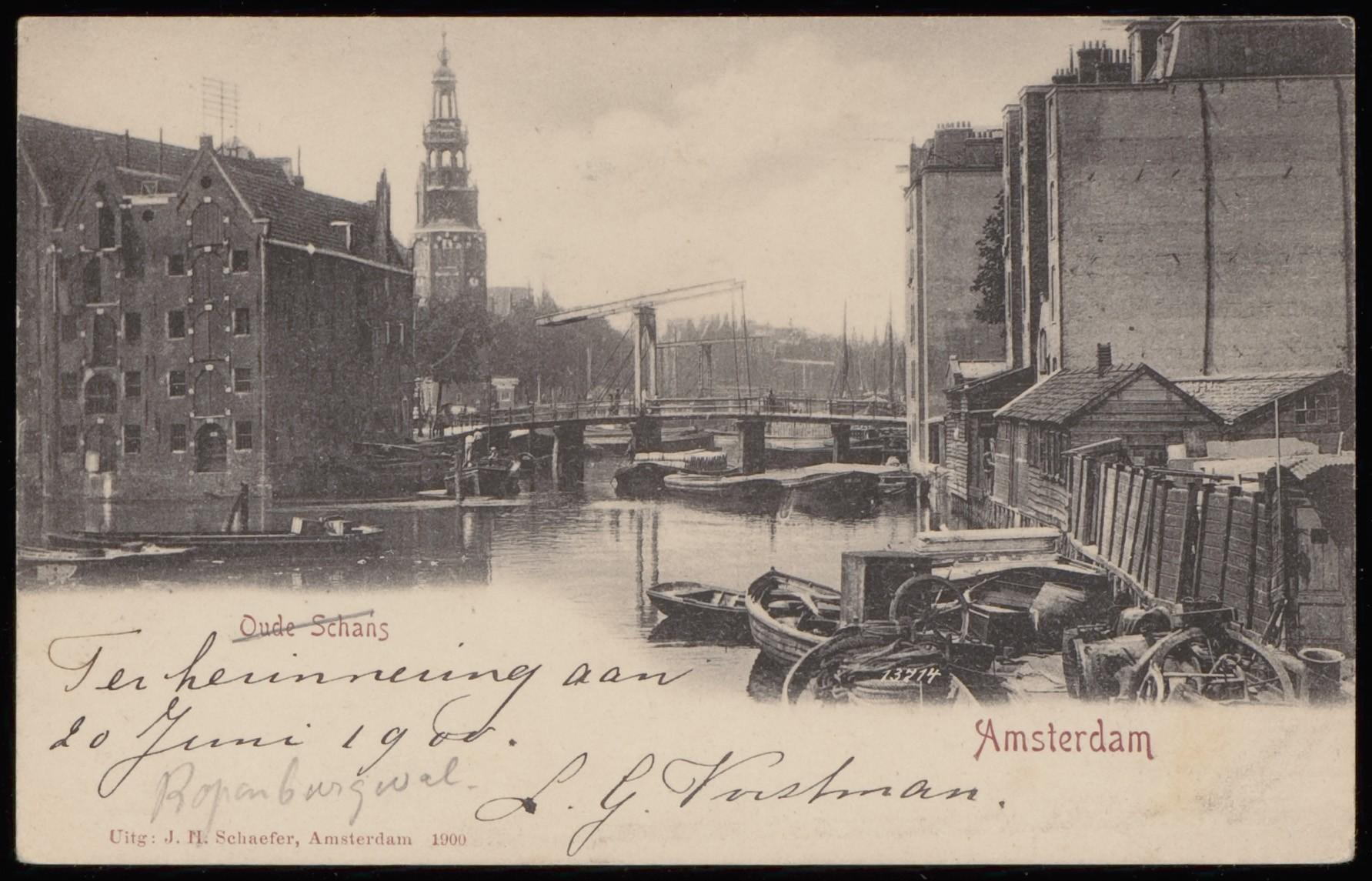
Rapenburg circa 1900

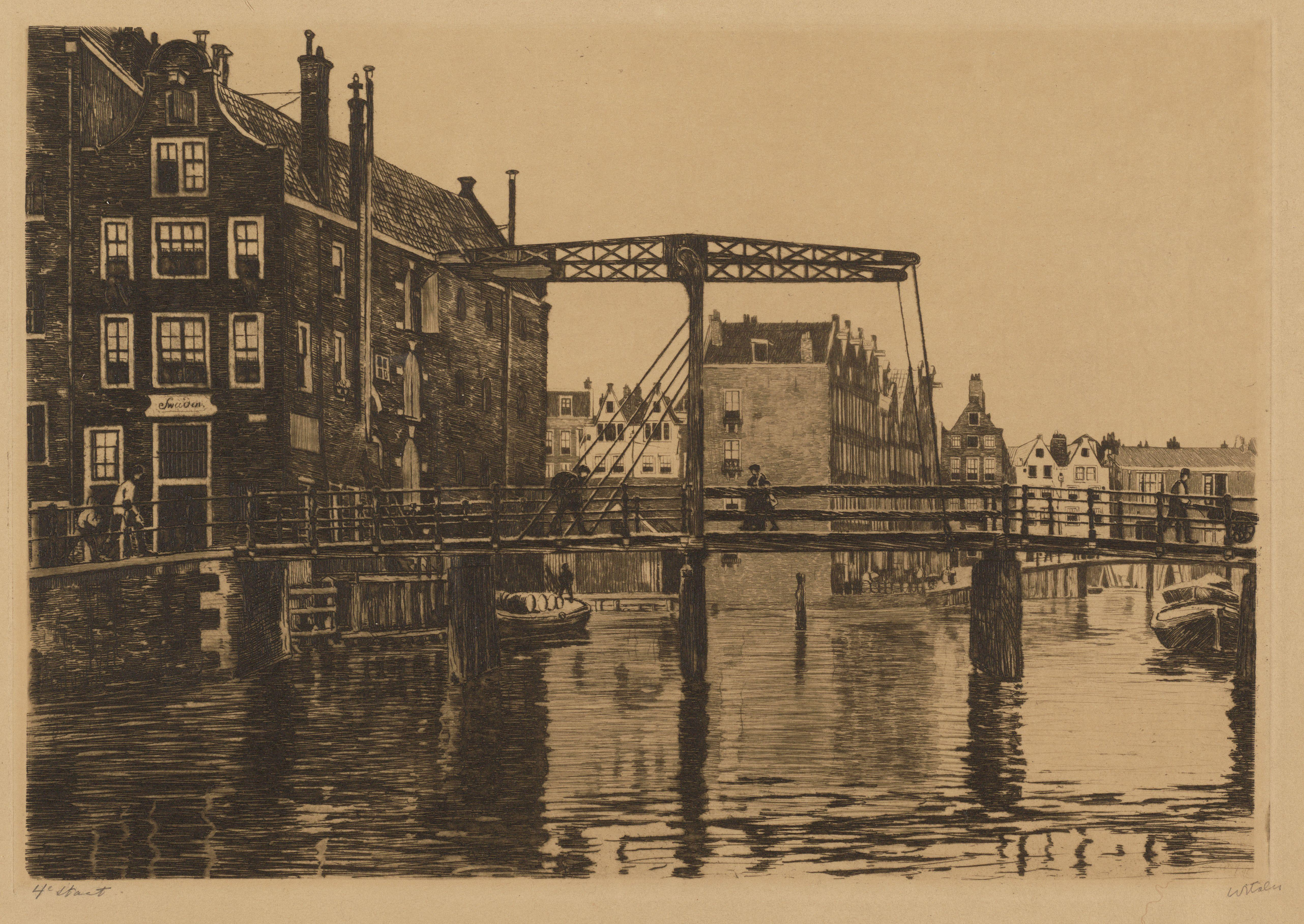
Bridge in Rapenburg, 1911

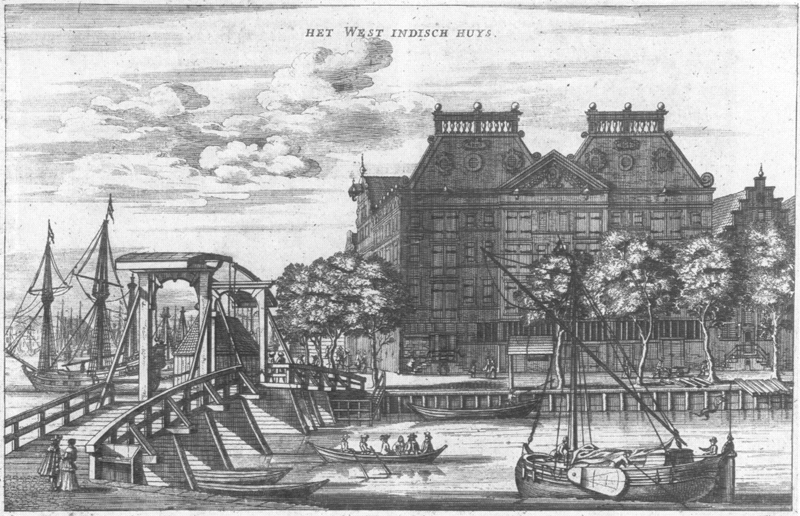
The West Indian Warehouse, built in 1642.

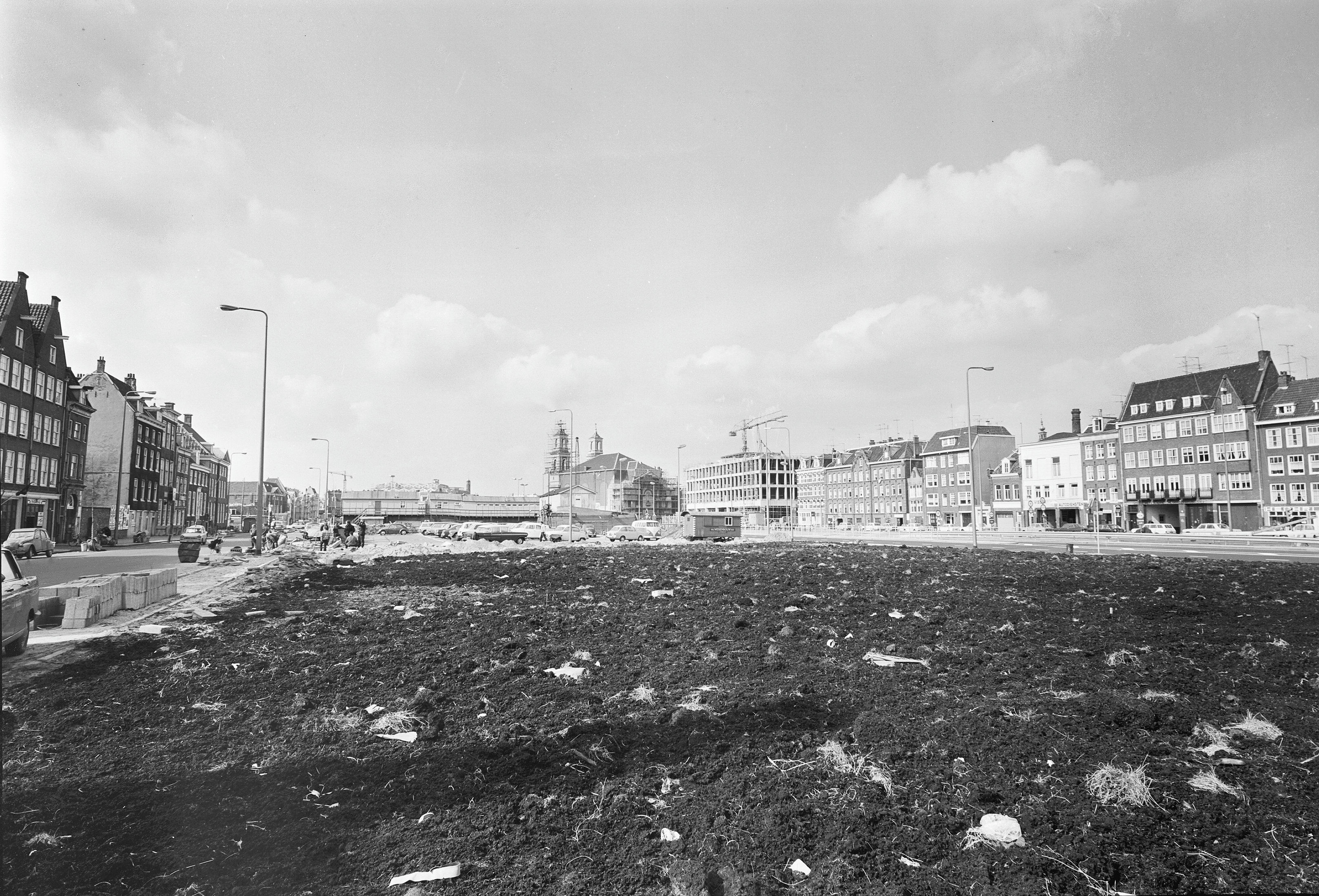
View in 1972 from the IJ tunnel to the Waterlooplein.
