= This Week in Libraries =

Dutch podcast about library innovations

- The TWIL logo

Presentation
- Hosted by: Erik Boekesteijn
- Genre: Libraries
- Language: English
- Updates: Fortnightly (series 4) Weekly (series 1-3)
- Length: 40 minutes

Publication
- Original release: 30 March 2010 – 2 October 2014
- Provider: Shanachie Media
- License: CC-BY-NC-SA

This Week in Libraries, also known as TWIL, was an English language video podcast series created and produced by Jaap van de Geer and Erik Boekesteijn in the Netherlands. Featuring Erik Boekesteijn as host, and Jaap van de Geer as co-host and cameraman the library themed talk show was filmed in the studio of the Openbare Bibliotheek Amsterdam (OBA) and also on location. The series drew an international audience focusing on innovation in libraries and was cited in future focused library plans. Episodes featured interviews with guests working in libraries, cultural institutions and associated industries and highlighted innovative service trends including event programming, digitization, library building design, collection development, ebooks, technology applications, online services and library marketing.

== History ==
The first episode aired on March 13, 2010 followed by series two (2011) and series three (2012) with season four re-launching on March 19, 2013 in a fortnightly format. The series fostered widespread discussion of innovation in libraries in North America, Europe, Singapore and Australia.

During the first season, in episode 5, Dutch journalist Wendy de Graaf from Bibliotheekblad turned the tables on the show's creators and interviewed them about the motivation for a global program about libraries and their plans for future episodes. Although not syndicated, the program was endorsed and promoted widely by library bloggers, and some library associations around the world.

The fifth and final season screened in 2014 with the final episode 121 featuring Martin Berendse the Chief Executive of the Amsterdam Public Library.

=== Guests ===
The show featured many high-profile guests and organizations, including David Weinberger (episode #83), Father Roderick Vonhögen (episode #3), Stuart Hamilton from International Federation of Library Associations and Institutions (episode #15), Aubéry Escande from The European Library (episode #79), Justo Hidalgo (episode #77), Johan Oomen from the Netherlands Institute for Sound and Vision (episode #71), Peter Gorgels (episode #94) from the Rijksmuseum, Dan Cohen (episode #98) Executive Director of the Digital Public Library of America(DPLA), author Richard Watson (episode #108) and futurist Thomas Frey (episode #109).

== Distribution ==
Episodes were distributed via the This Week in Libraries website and commencing with episode 77 some episodes were also available as an audio download via iTunes. In June 2013 Library Journal announced a partnership with Erik Boekesteijn and Jaap van de Geer to publish monthly highlights from This Week in Libraries episodes.

=== Social media ===
This Week in Libraries made extensive use of social media to engage a global library community watching the show and discussing the topics raised in episodes. The show used a discussion group in LinkedIn, and presences on Twitter, Flickr and Vimeo as well as an email newsletter for subscribers. The program influenced libraries in using social media for marketing and branding.

== Funding ==
Each series of This Week in Libraries featured sponsors including the Royal Library of the Netherlands and the Amsterdam Public Library. In the hiatus between series two and three, TWIL fans campaigned to raise awareness and crowdfunding for series three via a HelpTWIL campaign.
