= Emerson Literary Society =

Social society at Hamilton College in Clinton, New York, US

The Emerson Literary Society (ELS) is a co-ed, non-exclusive social society at Hamilton College in Clinton, New York.

Since 1882, ELS has operated on the Hamilton campus. From 1884-1995, the society operated a residence, open to all members. Since the closing of the house in 1995, ELS has maintained a presence at Hamilton, hosting social events and presenting public programs.

== Early history ==
The society was founded in 1882, making it one of the oldest private societies on the Hamilton College campus. It was the first society to become co-educational when the College admitted women, and remains one of only two co-ed social societies on the campus.^{The other?}

Six weeks before Ralph Waldo Emerson's death, a group of Hamilton students honored his life's work by founding a non-secretive society based on his American philosophy. At first a fraternity (Hamilton College would not admit women until nearly 100 years later), the fledgling organization sold stock certificates to build a house off the campus of the college in 1884.

== Later history ==
Over the years, the house changed with the times and adapted Emerson's words into a modern context through practical application. Over 2,000 graduates of the small liberal arts college have associated themselves with the Emerson Literary Society in the 120 years that followed. In 1995, Emerson Hall and all other private society houses were closed by the College's Board of Trustees due to increasing pressure to decrease the role of private societies on the campus.

The profits from the sale of the house to the College were used to establish a board of trustees to manage the group's finances, as well as a yearly student scholarship and research grant. In 2004, the Emerson Literary Society began its "Tell Us What You Know" lecture series, which brings diverse speakers and points of view to the campus. In the past, NASA scientists, Hawaiian historians, graphic novelists, experts in Japanese tea ceremony, spoken word artists, and ultimate fighters have been speakers. ELS also sponsors many social events, previously including the annual Smokin' Word and cabaret open mic nights, and currently including the annual Oktoberfest and Rocky Horror Picture Show parties. Even without a house, the Emerson Literary Society continues its tradition of forward thought and welcoming community. Meetings continue to be held weekly in the former ELS house, currently called the Sadove Student Center at Emerson Hall, open to all members of the Hamilton student body.
