= English Language School, Dubai =

English Language Private School

Location
- Karama; Dubai; United Arab Emirates
- Coordinates: 25.24126846789586°N 55.31817682675413°E

Information
- School type: Private school
- Motto: Success through Education
- Religious affiliation: Islam
- Established: April 1978
- School board: GCE, IGCSE Edexcel
- Principal: Sir Muhammad Atif
- Teaching staff: 120+
- Grades: FS2–Year 13
- Age range: 4–19
- Enrollment: 2000+
- Sixth form students: 120+
- Classes: 5/day
- Average class size: 30
- Language: English, Urdu, French, Arabic
- Classrooms: 100+
- Houses: 4
- Colours: Blue and White
- Athletics: Cricket, Football, Volleyball, Badminton, Tennis
- Website: Official website

The English Language Private School (ELPS), formerly known as English Medium School, was established in April 1978 in order to cater to the growing educational needs of people in the United Arab Emirates, particularly within the expatriate community.

== About ==
English Language Private School has over 2000 students from preschool to Grade 13, supported by more than 120 teachers. The student body represents 36 nationalities, with students primarily from Pakistan, followed by Egypt, Philippines, Sri Lanka, Iran, India, Italy, Sudan, Nigeria, Saudi Arabia, Afghanistan and other countries.

English Language Private School is located near to Pakistan Education Academy.

ELPS is organised into FS2, KS1, KS2, KS3, KS4 (GCSE) and KS5 (A Level). The school offers Edexcel GCE and Edexcel International A Levels (IAL) at A Level and Edexcel IGCSE at O Level.
