= Openbare Bibliotheek Amsterdam =

Public library organization in Amsterdam, The Netherlands

Amsterdam Public Library
- Openbare Bibliotheek Amsterdam
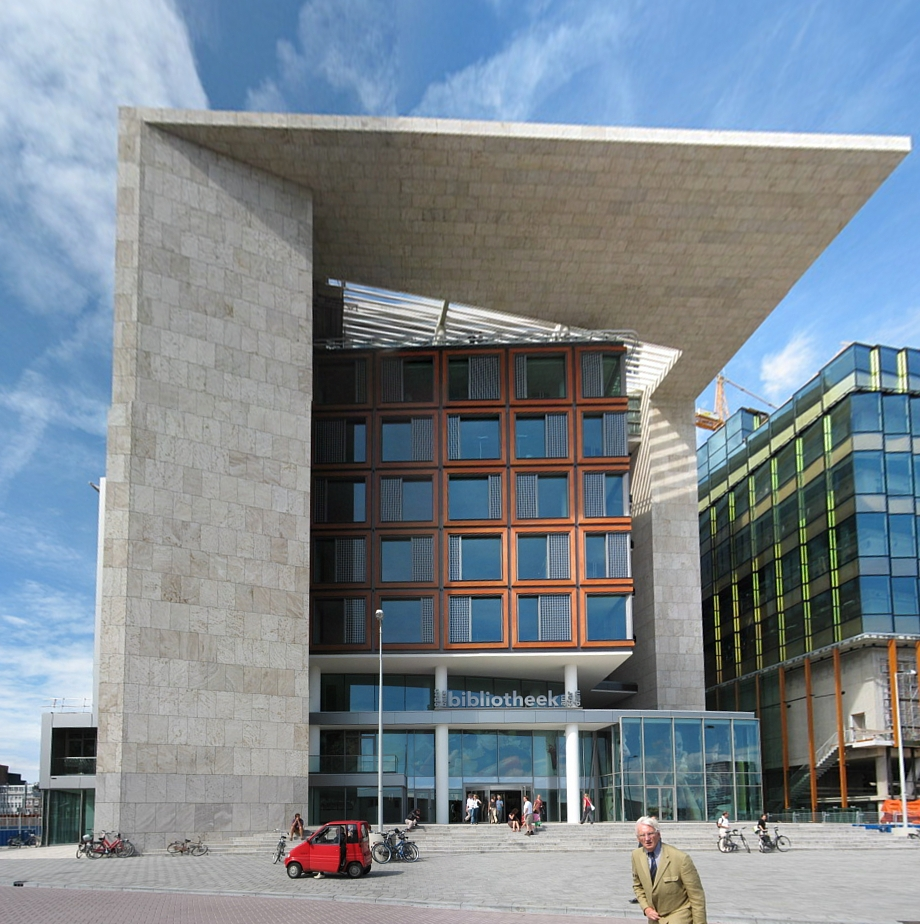
- The central library in 2007
- 52°22′33″N 4°54′26″E
- Location: Amsterdam, Diemen, Ouder-Amstel, Netherlands
- Type: Public library
- Established: 8 February 1919
- Branches: 26

Collection
- Size: 1.3 million objects

Access and use
- Circulation: c. 3 million objects
- Members: 177,000

Other information
- Director: Martin Berendse (since 2014)
- Employees: 354 employees (2015)
- Website: www.oba.nl

The Openbare Bibliotheek Amsterdam (Dutch pronunciation: [ˌoːpə(m)ˈbaːrə biblijoːˈteːk ˌɑmstərˈdɑm]; OBA; English: Amsterdam Public Library) is an organisation of public libraries in Amsterdam, Diemen and Ouder-Amstel in the Netherlands. The first library opened in 1919 at the Keizersgracht in Amsterdam. As of 2018, the OBA had 26 branch libraries, 177,000 members, and 1.3 million objects in its collection.

== History ==
The first public reading room and library of Amsterdam was opened at the Keizersgracht on 8 February 1919. The Central Library was opened at the Prinsengracht in 1977 and moved to the Oosterdokseiland in 2007.

The video podcast This Week in Libraries (2010–2014) was recorded in the Central Library.

The OBA was selected as the best library of the Netherlands in 2012.

== Collections ==
As of 2018, the OBA has a general collection of 1.3 million books, CDs, and DVDs. The library also has a number of special collections with books about the history of Amsterdam, children's books from the 17th–21st century, and books from the Dutch authors Gerard Reve, Hella Haasse, and Boudewijn Büch.

== Branches ==
The OBA has 26 branches in Amsterdam, Diemen, Duivendrecht, and Ouderkerk aan de Amstel. The largest branch is the Central Library or OBA Oosterdok at the Oosterdokseiland, just east of Amsterdam Centraal station.

=== Central Library ===
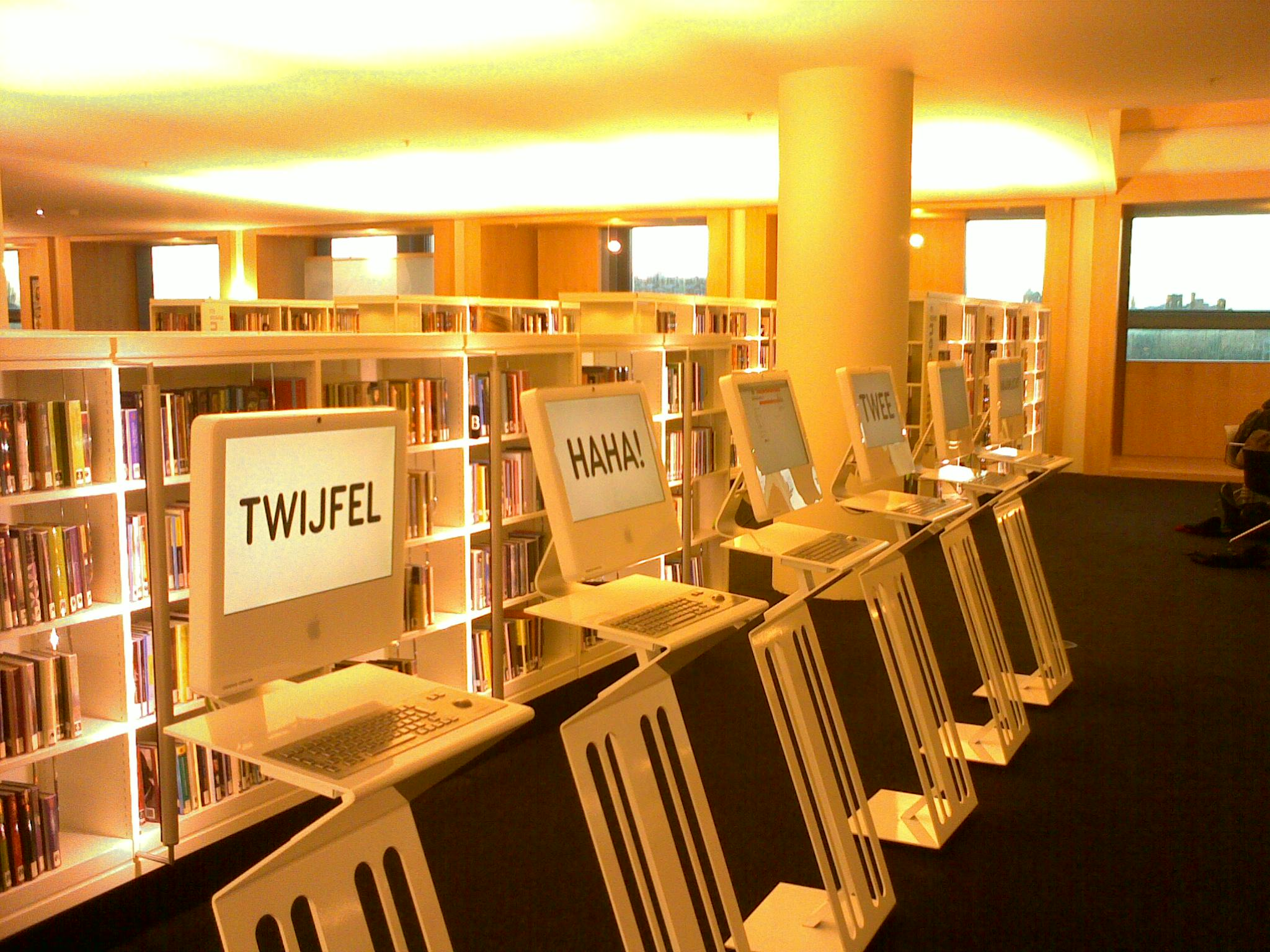
The interior of the Central Library

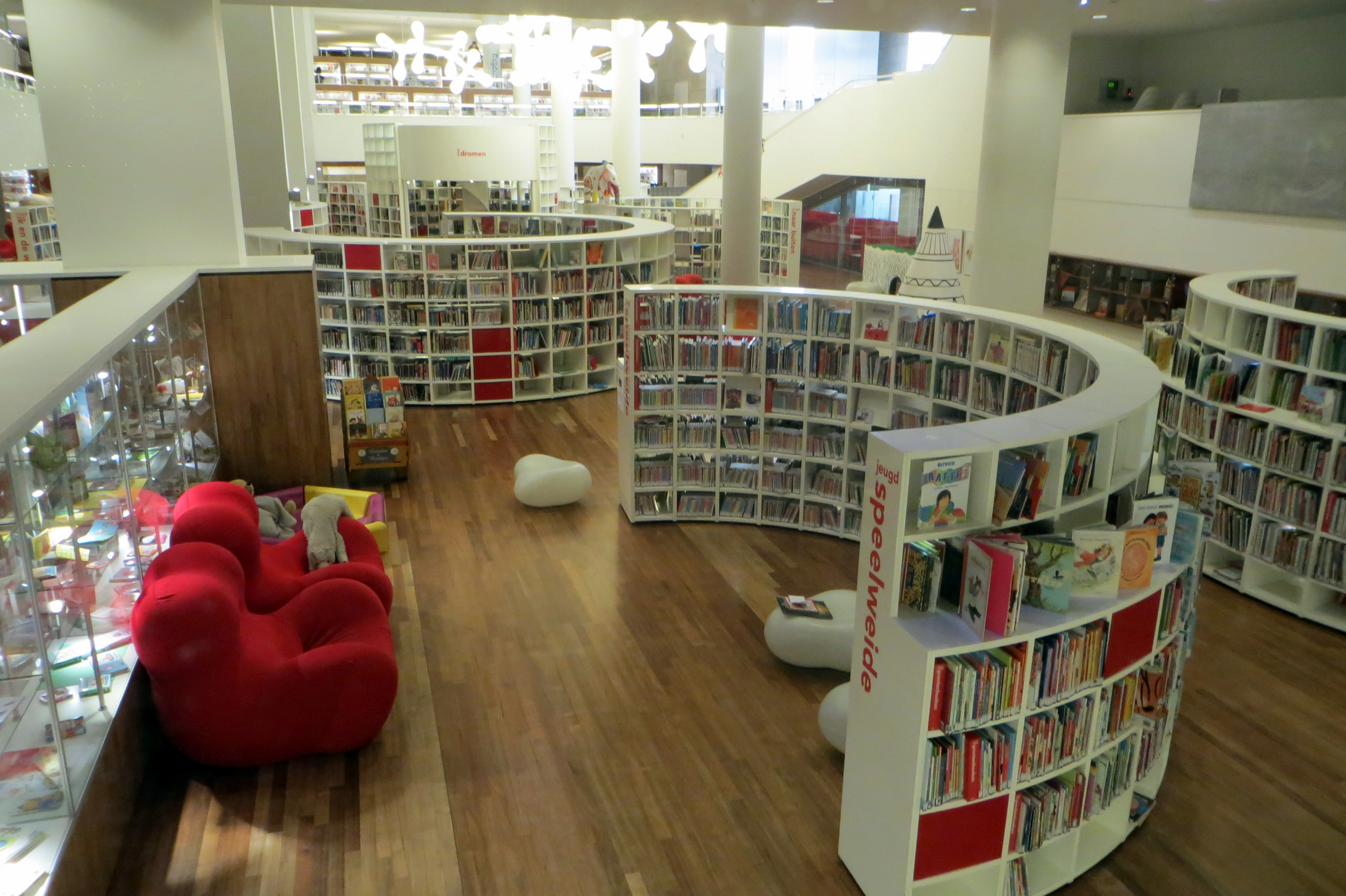
Children's book section of the Central Library

The Central Library or OBA Oosterdok has a floor surface of 28,500 m^{2} (307,000 sq ft), spread out over 10 floors, 1200 seats, of which 600 have Internet-connected computers, and a staff of 200. Also included are an auditorium, an exhibition room, the Library Museum, the Gerard Reve Museum and 2000 parking spaces for bicycles. On the seventh floor is a restaurant with a south-facing terrace.

The cost of the project was €80 million. The building was designed by Jo Coenen, the former state architect (Rijksbouwmeester) of the Netherlands, who also designed the nearby KNSM Island, as well as the Central Library of Maastricht, and renovated the distinctive Glaspaleis in Heerlen, which houses its Central Library. Arup were selected to create the lighting design to create "a landscape with different zones" and a system for distributing fresh air which cools the building through drawing in the cold air outside.

The Central Library is open seven days per week from 10 a.m. to 10 p.m. and the lending and returning of books is fully automated. Not only does the OBA provide a large range of printing and copying facilities, but some other unusual features can be found in the library, such as two radio stations. AmsterdamFM is located on the first floor and OBA Live is on the fourth floor. Both radio stations have live broadcasts where the public is welcome to watch.

The library has an exposition area which features rotating expositions related to design, art and/or books. All the expositions are open to the public for free.

=== Neighborhood branches ===
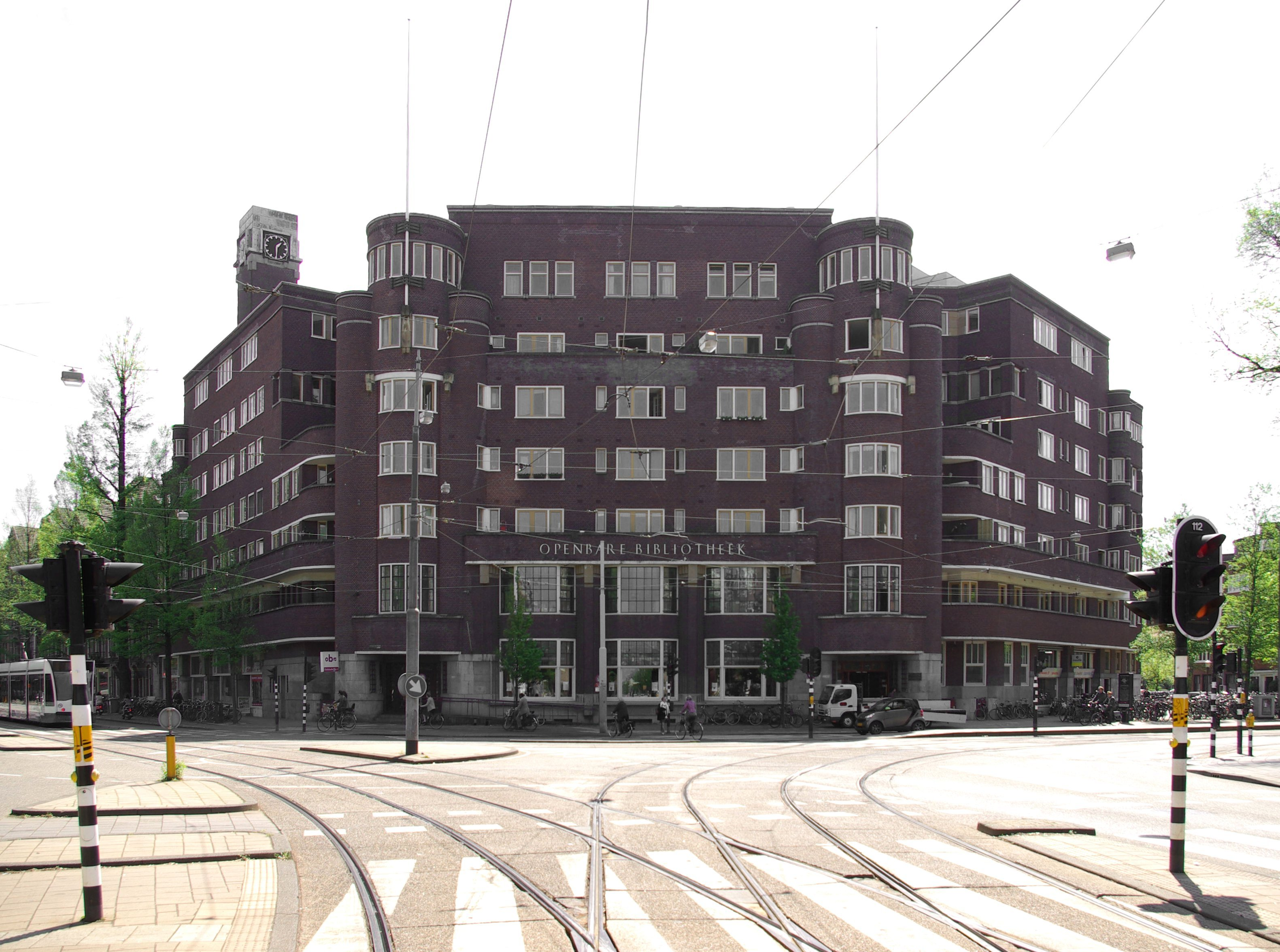
OBA Roelof Hartplein in Het Nieuwe Huis

Besides the Central Library or OBA Oosterdok, there are 25 branches in various neighborhoods of Amsterdam and in the villages of Diemen, Duivendrecht, and Ouderkerk aan de Amstel:

- OBA Banne
- OBA Bijlmerplein
- OBA Buitenveldert
- OBA Bos en Lommer
- OBA CC Amstel
- OBA Diemen
- OBA Duivendrecht
- OBA Ganzenhoef
- OBA Geuzenveld
- OBA De Hallen
- OBA IJburg
- OBA Javaplein
- OBA Linnaeus
- OBA Mercatorplein
- OBA Molenwijk
- OBA Olympisch Kwartier
- OBA Osdorp
- OBA Ouderkerk
- OBA Van der Pek
- OBA Reigersbos
- OBA Roelof Hartplein
- OBA Slotermeer
- OBA Slotervaart
- OBA Spaarndammerbuurt
- OBA Staatsliedenbuurt
- OBA Waterlandplein
- OBA Weesp

== See also ==
- List of libraries in the Netherlands
