= Oosterdokseiland =

Coordinates: 52°22′36″N 4°54′26″E

- Neighborhood
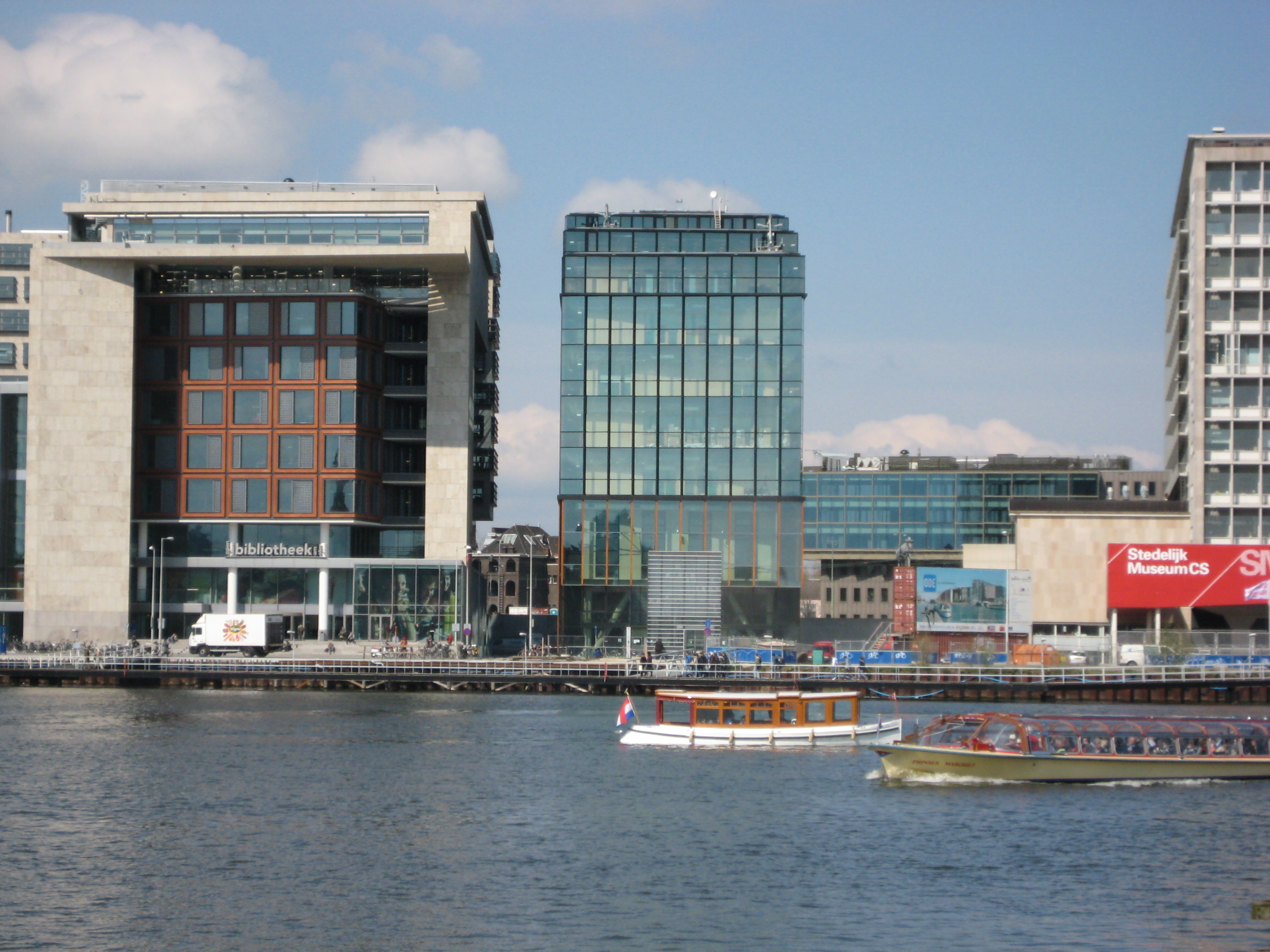
- Oosterdokseiland with the Amsterdam Central Library (left) and Amsterdam Conservatory (middle)
- Interactive map of Oosterdokseiland
- Country: Netherlands
- Province: North Holland
- COROP: Amsterdam
- Time zone: UTC+1 (CET)

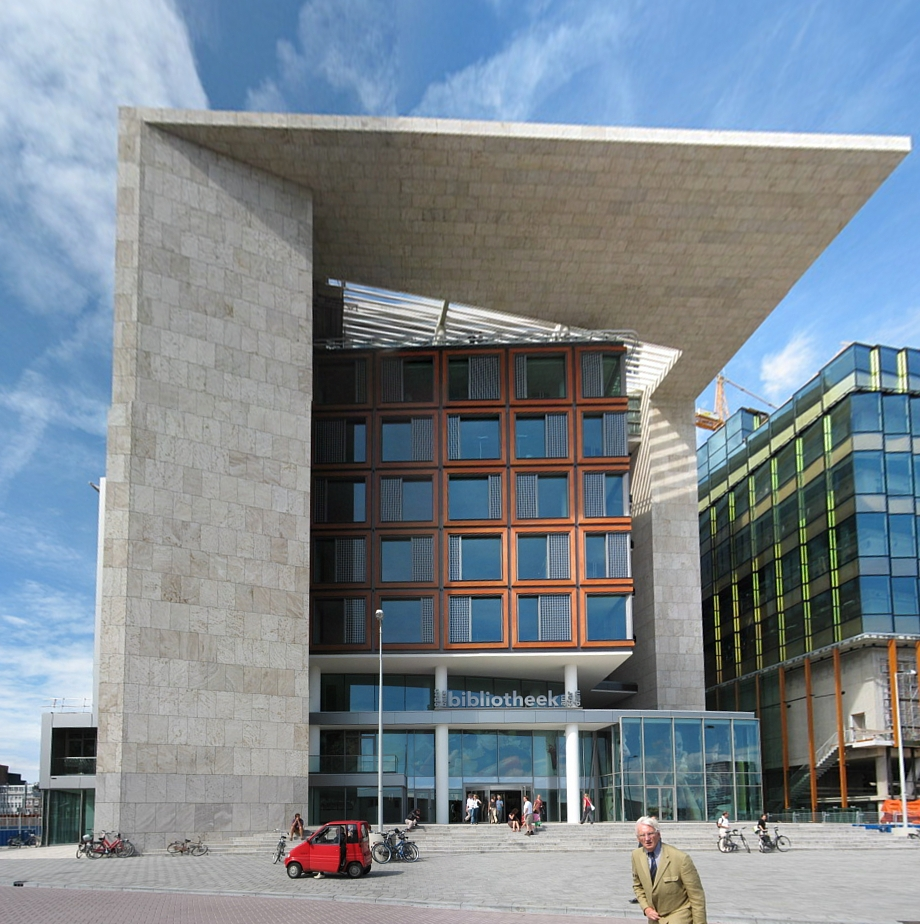
Amsterdam Central Library on Oosterdokseiland

Oosterdokseiland (Dutch: "Eastern Dock Island") is an island that forms a neighborhood of Amsterdam, Netherlands just to the east of Amsterdam Centraal railway station.

== History ==
The nucleus of the island was created in 1832 when the Oosterdok was dammed off from the IJ. It was expanded to its current size when the first railroad was constructed at the site in the 1870s. In the 1960s the main Amsterdam post office was built on the island, which was torn down in 2005.

== Current Situation ==
The Oosterdokseiland is now home to a mix of public and private users. This includes the Amsterdam Public Library (main branch), the Amsterdam Conservatory, a flagship location of Enterprise Rent-a-Car (main branch), a DoubleTree by Hilton hotel, a Saturn electronics megastore, multiple residential complexes, and about 65,000 square metres (700,000 ft^{2}) of office space, including the headquarters of navigation system manufacturer TomTom.
