= Els Vanheusden =

Els Vanheusden is a Belgian physician, businesswoman and from 2004 until 31 May 2008, general manager of FlandersBio, the cluster of the Flemish biotech industry. She was succeeded by Ann Van Gysel on 1 June 2008.

== Education ==
Els Vanheusden graduated as a Medical Doctor at the Katholieke Universiteit Leuven (Leuven, Belgium) and in addition obtained two master's degrees in Hospital Management and Aeronautical and Space Medicine.

== Career ==
She started her career in 1992 as brand manager at Procter & Gamble where she was involved in the set-up of the pharmaceutical division and building up the Benelux pharmaceutical business. From 1995 until 1997 she was marketing manager with responsibilities in both Belgium and France.

She joined the European headquarters of Guidant Europe in 1997, as manager special international projects for Russia and Eastern Europe. At the end of 1998, she became responsible for European marketing at Biosense Webster, a Johnson & Johnson company.

In December 2000, she co-founded PharmaDM, a spin-off company from the Katholieke Universiteit Leuven (Leuven, Belgium), Aberystwyth University (Wales, United Kingdom) and the University of Oxford (England, United Kingdom) and became its first Chief Executive Officer. In September 2004, she was appointed general manager of FlandersBio.New General Manager at FlandersBio. In 2008 she took another step in her career and started working for Capricorn Venture Partners, a venture capital funds company, in which she helped founding the €42M Health-Tech fund.

As of 2012 Els is active as health tech consultant.

In 2017 she became general manager of Multiversum, the largest psychiatric hospital cluster in Belgium.

== Sources ==
- Data miners work a rich seam of drug discovery (PharmaDM)
- Biosmile Project (PDF)
- Els Vanheusden
