= Encyclopedia of Life Sciences =

Reference work published by Wiley-Blackwell

eLS (previously known as the Encyclopedia of Life Sciences) is a reference work that covers the life sciences; it is published by Wiley-Blackwell.

As of June 2012, there were more than 4,800 article topics published in eLS online. eLS is updated monthly and over 400 articles are added to eLS each year.

eLS is available online and in a print edition. The online edition was launched in April 2001, with the print edition published in January 2002. Full access to eLS requires a subscription. Article abstracts, key concepts, figures and references are freely accessible. At the end of 2004, eLS was acquired by Wiley-Blackwell from the Nature Publishing Group.
