= Ann Van Gysel =

Belgian scientist and businesswoman

- Education: University of Antwerp; University of Ghent; PhD in Molecular Genetics in Professor Marc Van Montagu's laboratory
- Occupations: Scientist and businesswoman

Ann Van Gysel is a Belgian scientist and CEO of MEDVIA, a healthcare cluster that supports innovation in Flanders, Belgium.

== Education ==
Ann obtained her bachelor's degree in biology from the University of Antwerp (Belgium), then went on to the University of Ghent where she did a master's degree in Zoology and a PhD in Molecular Genetics in Professor Marc Van Montagu's laboratory. In 1998 she completed an additional degree in Marketing and Communication with a focus on biotech communications.

== Career ==
Ann started her career at the University of Ghent, where she ran a research group in the Department of Plant Genetics for 4 years. In 1997, she continued her career at the Flanders Interuniversity Institute for Biotechnology (VIB) as Communications Manager. There she was responsible for the public outreach and educational programs as well as public relations and internal communications.

From 2008 to 2011, Ann was the managing director of FlandersBio, a life sciences cluster organization based in Flanders, Belgium.

In 2011 she left FlandersBio and started Turnstone Communications, offering communications and business development services to biotech and pharma industries. With Turnstone Ann also founded BioVox, a news platform featuring life science and innovation news from Belgium. Ann sold Turnstone and BioVox to QbD in 2023.

In 2022, Ann became CEO of MEDVIA, an industry-driven membership organization that supports health entrepreneurs by fostering innovation in healthcare. It was formed in a public-private partnership with Flanders Innovation & Entrepreneurship (VLAIO), and has around 150 members from industry, hospitals and academia.

Ann is also an independent member of the Board of Directors of the Flanders Marine Institute (VLIZ).

== Sources ==
- New General Manager of FlandersBio
- Ann Van Gysel gaat FlandersBio leiden (Dutch)
- Flandersbio Topvrouw Ann Van Gysel stapt op
