= Els Dietvorst =

Belgian artist, filmmaker and shepherd

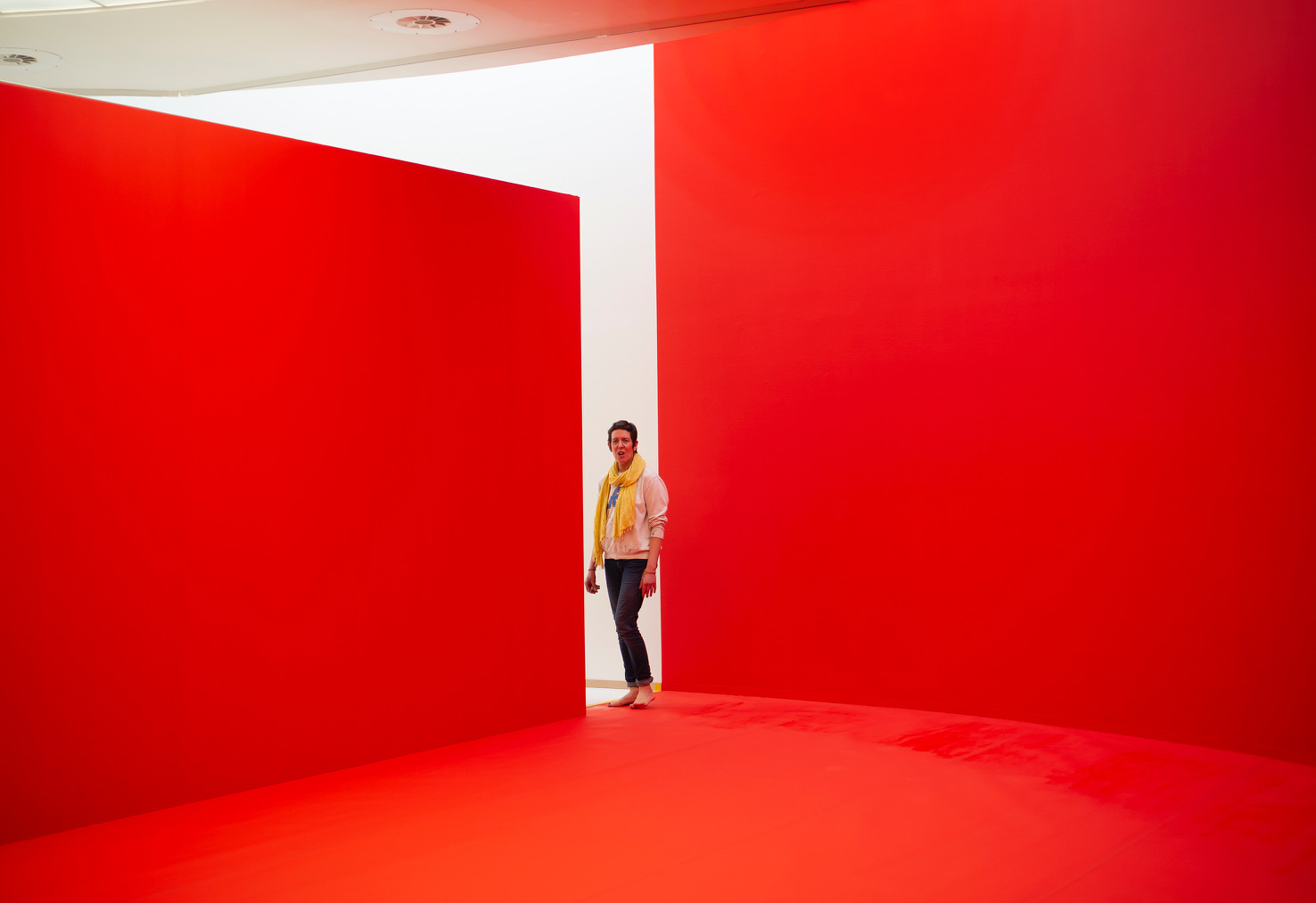
- Els Dietvorst, 2020, MUHKA
- Website: http://www.elsdietvorst.be

Els Dietvorst is a Belgian artist, filmmaker who lives and works in Duncormick, Ireland.

== Career ==
Dietvorst is an artist whose work focuses on communication, collaboration, and social conflicts. She collects scraps and fragments of the world and models them, films them, draws them, and tells their story in images. Not so much to point out certain abuses and even less to save the world through art, but above all to provide something to hold on to for herself and the spectator, to create order where there was chaos and through the enumerated reality to hold up a mirror that allows us to tune in to the universal everydayness, to the common, to that which in a mad world is increasingly considered uncommon.

Her work has been shown and supported by well-known art institutes and festivals such as the Kaaitheatre, Brussels, Kunstenfestivaldesarts, Brussels, Museum of Modern Art, Antwerp (B), and BAK, Utrecht. Her work was also shown internationally in New York, Utrecht, Casablanca, London and Vienna.

In 2009 she curated the ‘Time Festival’ together with Dirk Braeckman. From the perspective of their concerns about the condition and the future of the world, the curators decided to make a clear statement: Time 2009 would be a book rather than a festival, a place to think rather than an event.

Her latest film ‘The Rabbit and the Teasel ’ (2014) was selected for its International premiere on April 17, 2015 in one of the most important documentary festivals in Europe, Visions du Reel, in Switzerland.

In September 2015 she was selected for the Moscow Biennal of Contemporary Art along with Luc Tuymans(B), Fabrice Hyber(F), Liam Gillick(USA), Gabriel Lester(NL), Birdhead(CN).

In 2017 she was the laureate of the Evens Arts Prize 2017. The Evens Foundation initiates, develops and supports projects that encourage people and nations to live together harmoniously in Europe.

== Films ==
By moving in 2010 from urban Belgium (Brussels) to rural Ireland (Duncormick) in a small farming community her work got a new dimension. Driven by the search of how we can connect again with our natural intuition and instincts she started a Web documentary ‘The Black Lamb’ (2010-2014). This webdoc and the film ‘The Rabbit and the Teasel’ (2014), are both inspired by the stories and memories that she registered from fellow farmers as well as my own encounters. ‘The Rabbit and the Teasel’ was selected in respected festivals as Ecofalante Environmental Film Festival, São Paulo, Festival Filmer a tout prix, Brussels, Festival dei popoli, Italy and Festival Planète Honnête, France.

Her last filmproject 'I watched the white dogs of the dawn' is based on the collective memory of a disappearing fishing community. The pressure caused by European fishing quotas threatens the village’s survival. The webdoc is a first step towards a new film, which will follow on from ‘The Rabbit and the Teasel’ as the second part of a trilogy about the relationship between humans and the natural world, and about how our food chain is shaped.
