= Els Iping =

Dutch politician (born 1953)

Els Iping (born 15 April 1953, Amsterdam) is a Dutch politician. As of 2007, Eping was chairman of the local council of Amsterdam's central district.
