= Burgwallen Nieuwe Zijde =

Coordinates: 52°22′27.06″N 4°53′25.81″E

- Neighborhood of Amsterdam
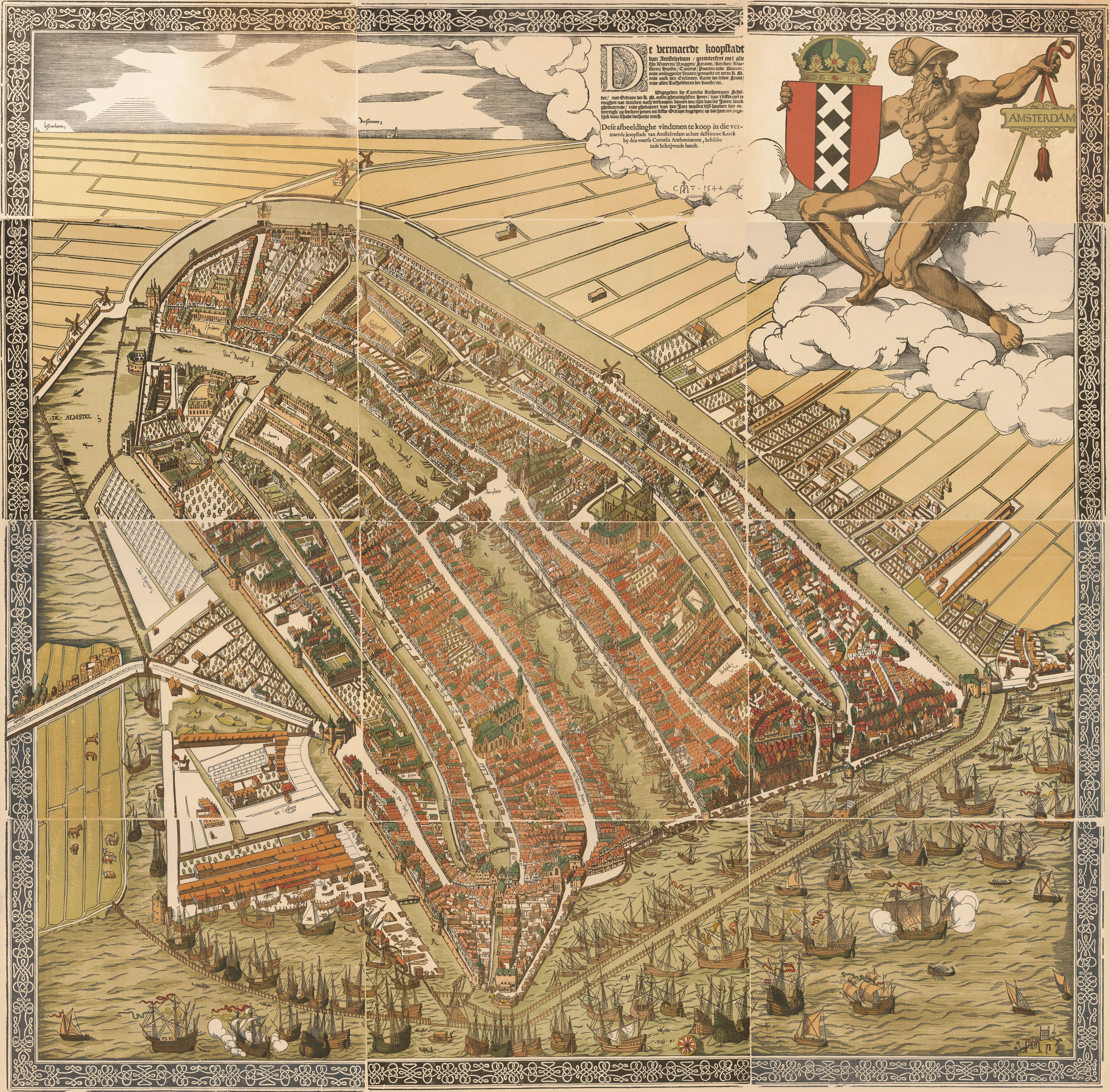
- The city center of Amsterdam. The Nieuwe Zijde (New Section) is the area to the right of the Amstel River
- Interactive map of Burgwallen Nieuwe Zijde
- Country: Netherlands
- Province: North Holland
- COROP: Amsterdam
- Time zone: UTC+1 (CET)

Burgwallen Nieuwe Zijde is a neighborhood of Amsterdam, Netherlands.
