= Ambachtsschool, Heerlen =

Ambachtsschool of Heerlen
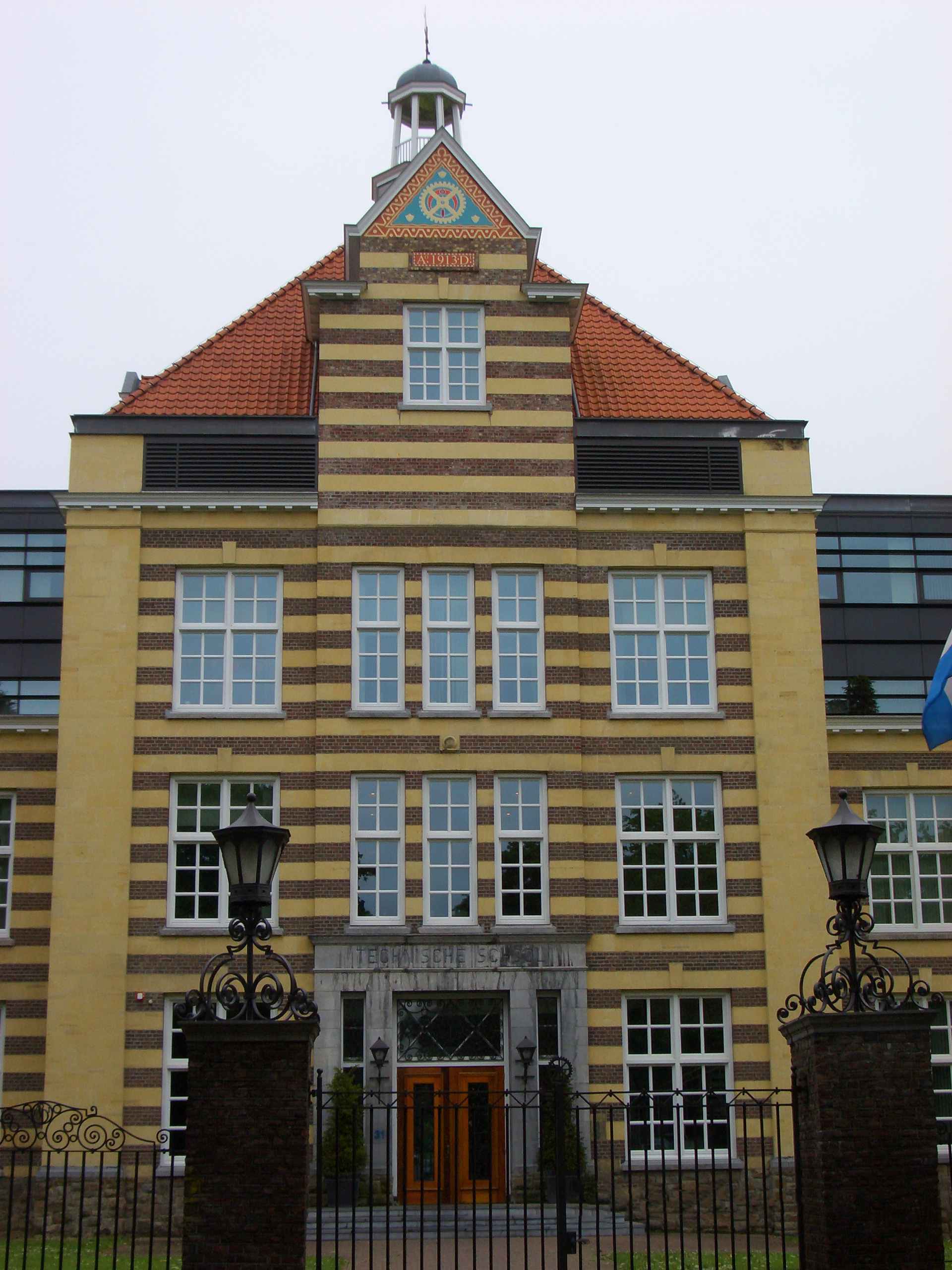
- Entrance to the Ambachtsschool in Heerlen
- Interactive map of the Ambachtsschool of Heerlen area

General information
- Architectural style: (neo-)Classicism
- Location: Heerlen, Netherlands
- Coordinates: 50.883745°N 5.974638°E
- Completed: 1913

Design and construction
- Architect: Jan Stuyt

The Ambachtsschool in Heerlen (Jan Stuyt, 1913) is a brick building with distinctive layers of marl (a stone commonly found in the south of Limburg). It is notable as one of the earliest vocational schools in the Netherlands. The building is located on the Burgemeester de Hesselleplein (formerly known as the Lindeplein), in Heerlen.

== History ==
When it first opened its doors, in May 1914, there were only 22 students. This number rapidly grew and in 1916 the students of the mining school moved to a different location (the Mijnschool). Later on the school became known as the "Technische School", a name that still can be seen carved above the entrances. In 1995 the last students left the building.

The original building was much smaller than today's; it consisted only of the main entrance building with two wings. In 1917, 1920 and 1929/1930 the building expanded. The former director's home was built at the same time by Jan Stuyt and is today a rijksmonument registered under the number 512779.

A fire destroyed much of the building in 1996. The building was renovated and expanded (with a modern look) by the Spanish architect firm Machay, Bohigas & Martorell.

== Architecture ==
The symmetry of the build, the distinctive layers of marl and windows point to influences of the Dutch renaissance. The massiveness of the building with its towers and great width dominates the square it is located on. Jan Stuyt's urbanistic view for Heerlen, including the creation of a system of squares, means the building can be seen from the center of the Tempsplein.
