= Basilica of Saint Nicholas, Amsterdam =

Co-cathedral Basilica of Saint Nicholas
- Co-kathedrale Basiliek van de Heilige Nicolaas
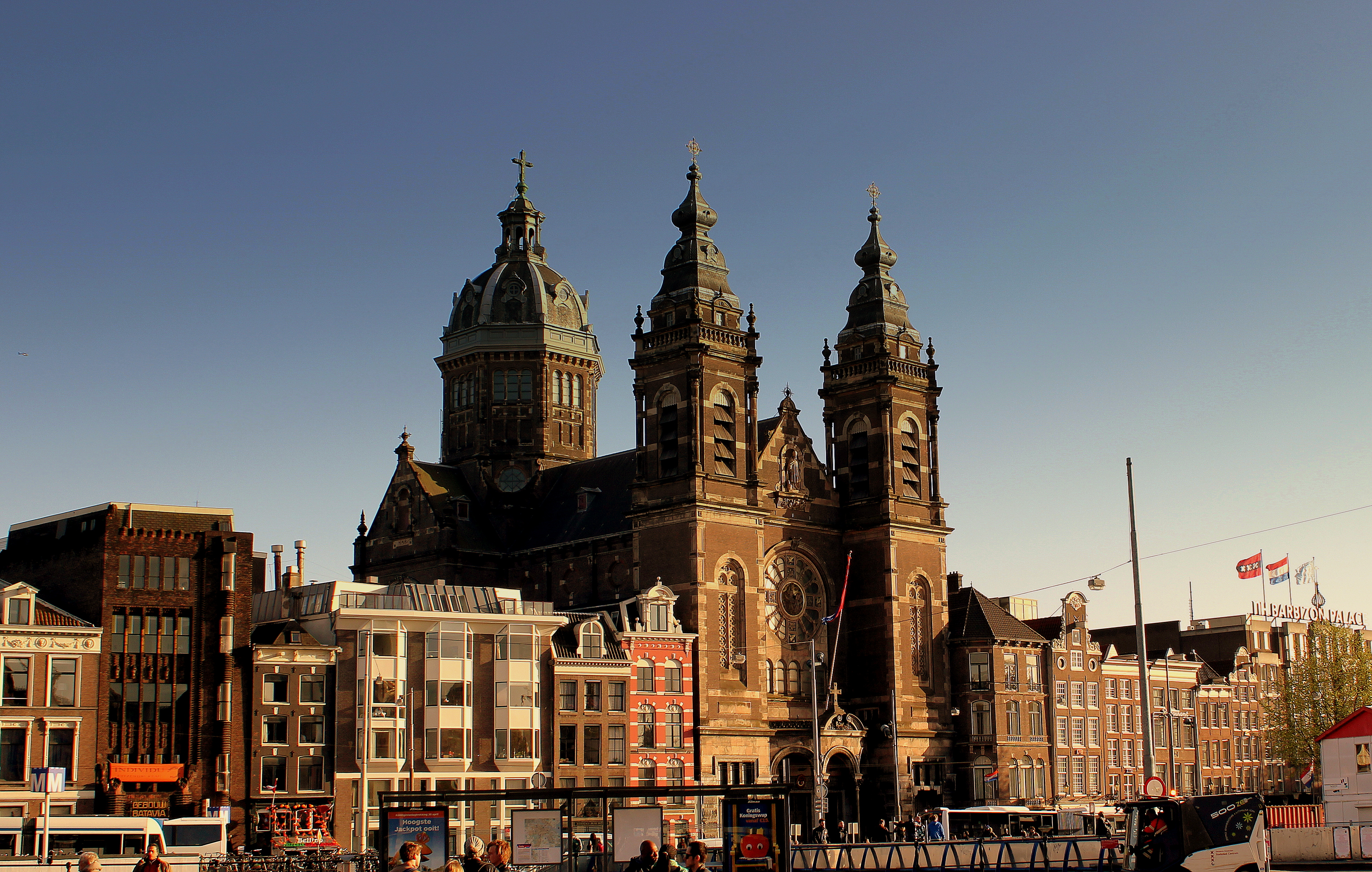
- The Co-cathedral in 2013

- Location in the city center of Amsterdam
- 52°22′35.3″N 4°54′4.1″E
- Location: Prins Hendrikkade 73; Amsterdam, Netherlands
- Denomination: Roman Catholic
- Website: www.nicolaas-parochie.nl

Architecture
- Architect: Adrianus Bleijs
- Style: Neo-Baroque; Neo-Renaissance
- Years built: 1884 - 1887

Administration
- Diocese: Haarlem-Amsterdam
- Parish: Amsterdam St Nicholas

The Co-cathedral Basilica of Saint Nicholas (Dutch: Co-kathedrale Basiliek van de Heilige Nicolaas) is located in the Old Centre district of Amsterdam, Netherlands, very close to Amsterdam's main railway station. Saint Nicholas is the patron saint of both the church and the city of Amsterdam. The basilica is the city's primary Roman Catholic church.

== Background ==
The church is built on a previously urban site necessitating a northwest–southeast axis to be adopted, rather than the standard east–west axis. It lies between the street Prins Hendrikkade and the canal Oudezijds Kolk.

When built, the church was called St. Nicholas inside the Walls, i.e. inside the Amsterdam City wall, the oldest part of the Amsterdam defence works. The architect Adrianus Bleijs (1842-1912) designed the church based on a combination of several revival styles: the most prominent being the Neo-Baroque and neo-Renaissance. Construction was completed in 1887.

In December 2021, the basilica received a relic of St. Nicholas from Egmond Abbey. Said to be a fragment of the saint's rib, the bone had been in the custody of the abbey since 1087.

== Description ==
The main facade is flanked by two towers, with a rose window in between. The centre of this window contains a bas-relief sculpture, depicting Christ and the four Evangelists, made in the Van den Bossche and Crevels workshop in 1886. A sculpture of Saint Nicholas by Bart van Hove stands in a niche in the upper section of the gable top.

The crossing of the main body of the church is articulated by a large octagonal tower with a baroque style dome and lantern, crowned by a cross. The basis of the floor plan is a classic three-aisled cross-basilica, with a nave, two aisles and a single transept. The choir has a conventional location, at the end of the nave. At the south-east ends of each side aisle, two chapels are located: one devoted to Mary and one to Joseph.

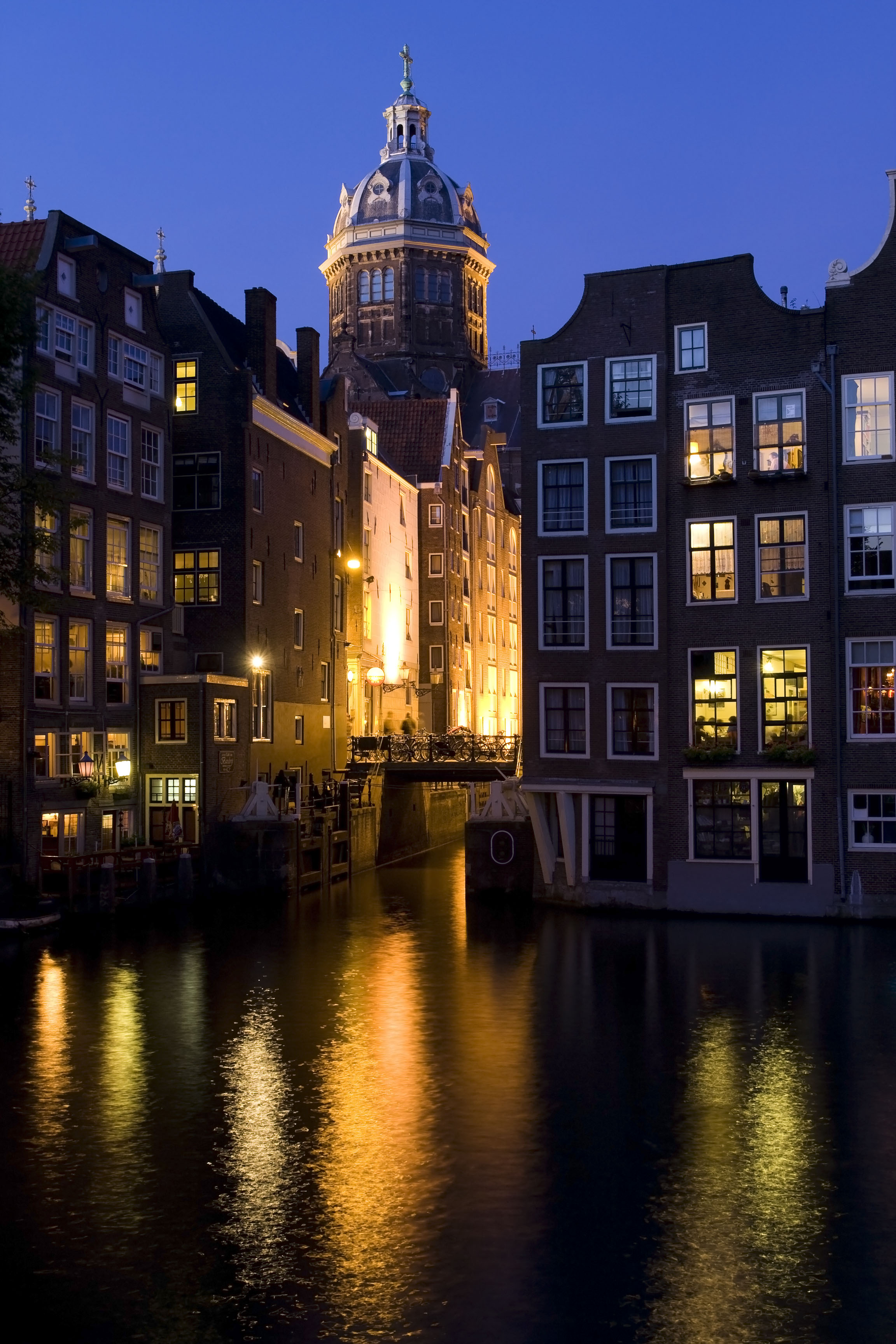
The dome of the basilica seen from the Oudezijds Voorburgwal

The basilica has a number of religious murals. Above the high altar is the crown of Maximilian I, which is a symbol seen throughout Amsterdam.

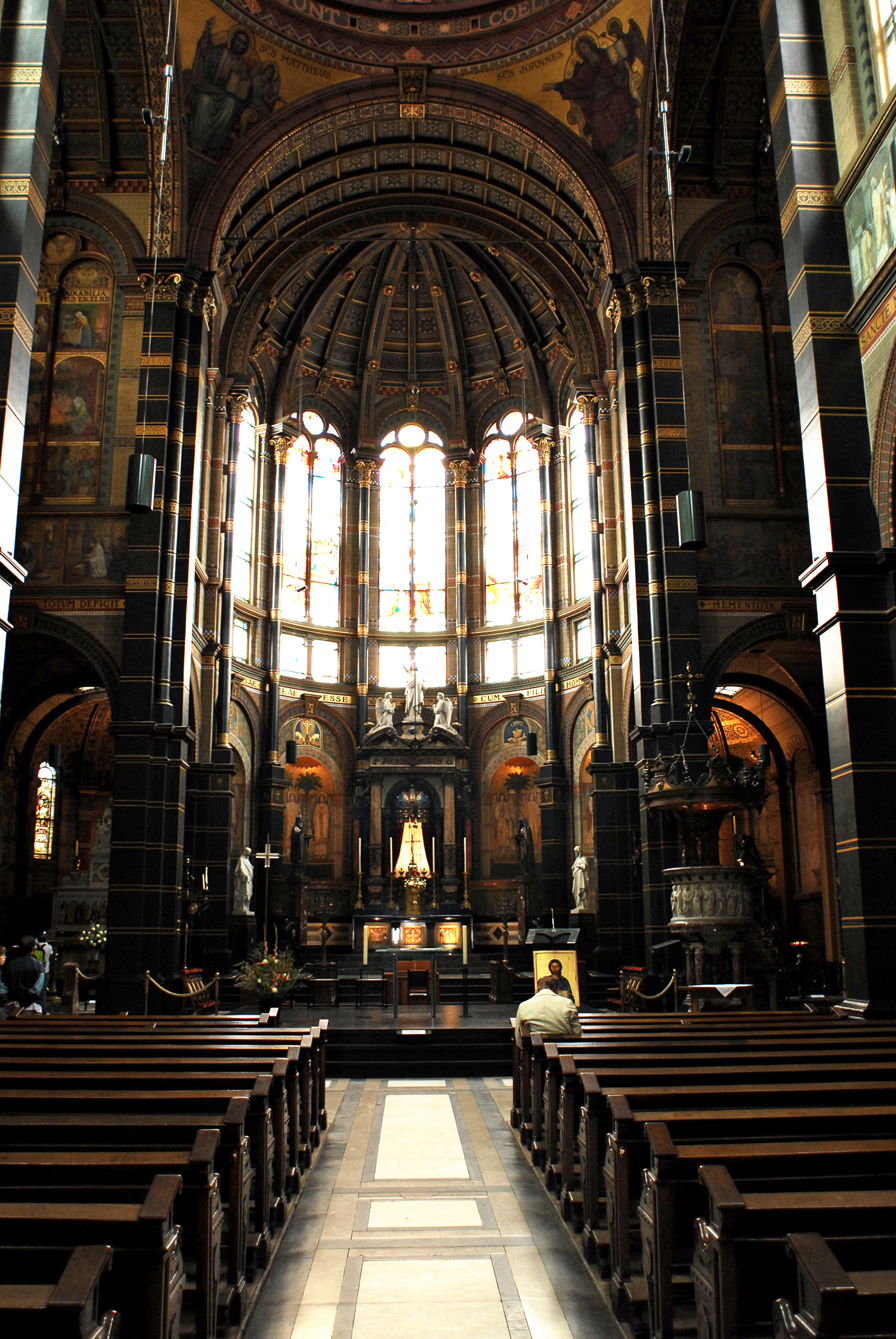
Interior of St Nicholas Basilica, Amsterdam

The central dome is highly ornate as viewed from below and contains four levels of stained glass, encircling the dome. The pulpit is located on the south end of the nave.

Above the main entrance of the church, beneath the rose window, an 1889 Sauer Organ can be found. An International Organ Concert Series is held during the summer months. The Stichting Muziek in de Nicolaas (SMN - the Music Foundation of the Basilica of St. Nicholas) was established in 2000. Its purpose is to facilitate the use of the basilica for the presentation of choral and instrumental music.

== Basilica status ==
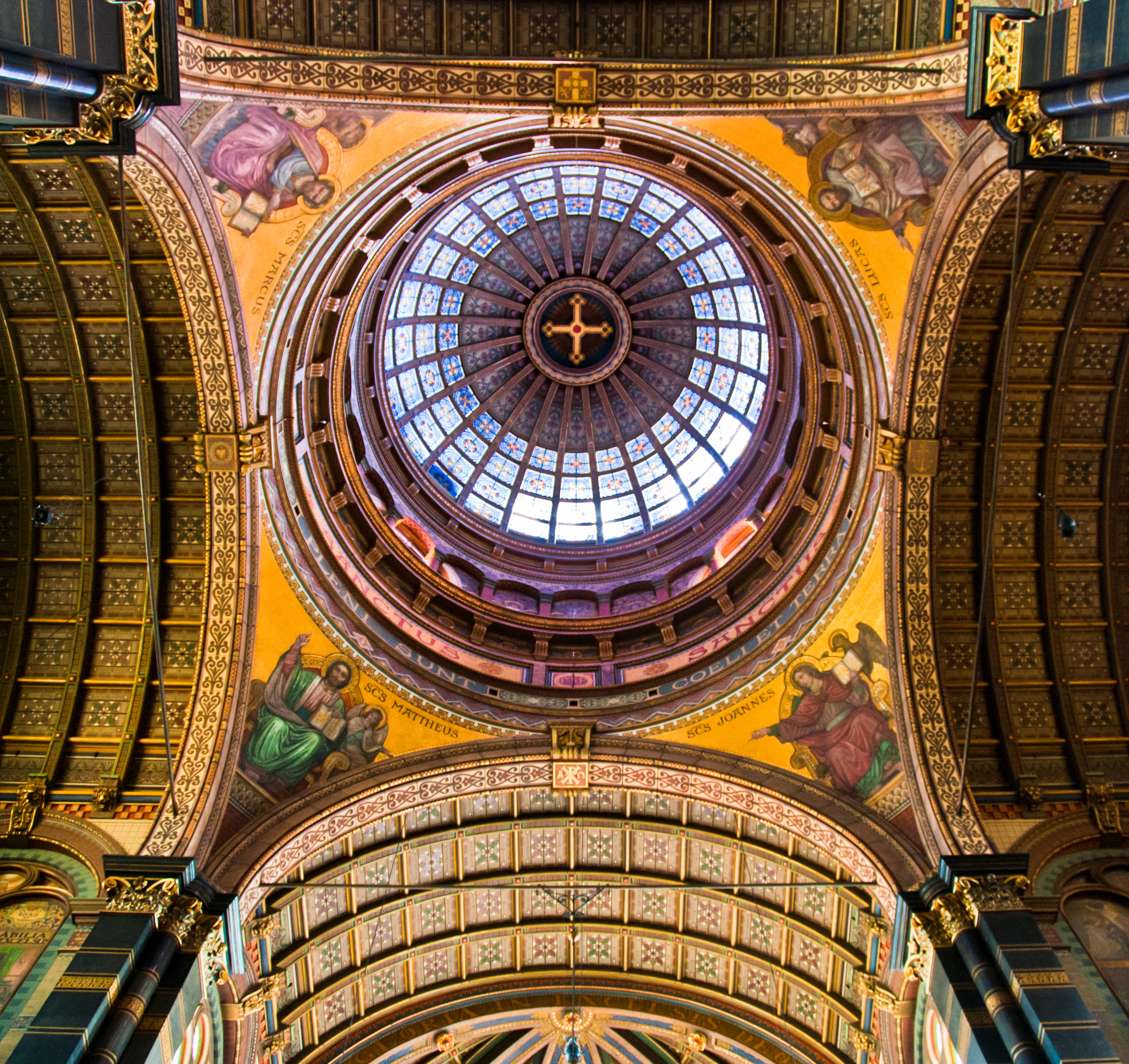
The interior of the dome.St Nikolas Basilica, Amsterdam

In the 125th year of its existence, St Nicholas' Church was elevated to a "basilica minor". This formally happened on 8 December 2012. The occasion was marked during a celebration of solemn Vespers, and was attended by ecclesiastical and secular authorities, including Mgr. A. Dupuy, Apostolic Nuncio to the Netherlands, who officially declared the change of status to the congregation.

== Co-cathedral ==
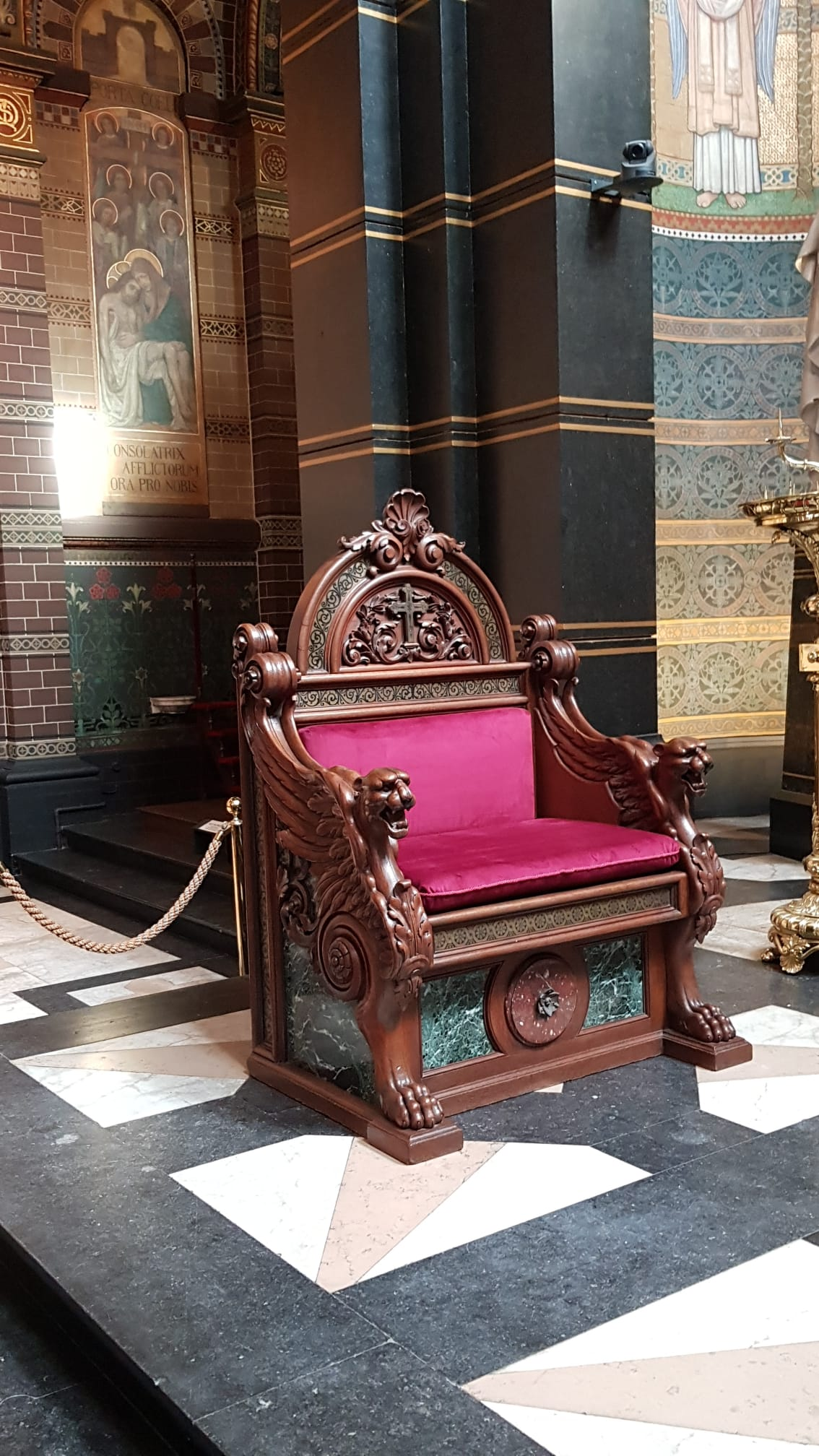
Episcopal "griffion" seat

On February 1st, 2025, Pope Francis elevated the basilica to Co-cathedral of the diocese Haarlem-Amsterdam. On March 8th, 2025, bishop Jan Hendriks solemnly occupied the ceremonial seat during a pontifical Mass. The seat is known as the "seat with the griffions" and was designed in 1853 as the first official seat of the diocese after 270 years of Protestant oppression and discrimination against Catholics ended.
