= Oudezijds Kolk =

Canal in Amsterdam

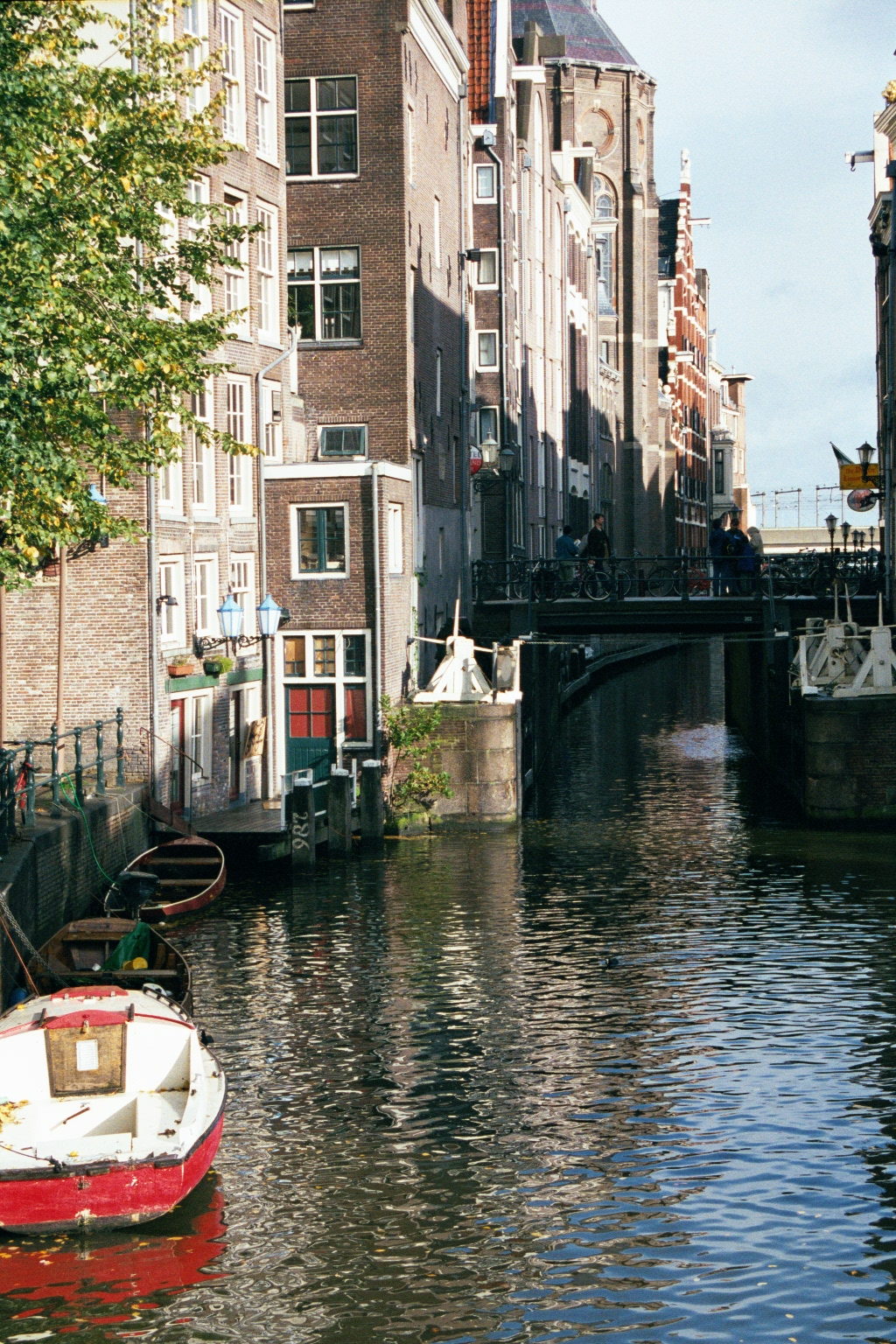
- The Zeedijk with the Oudezijds Kolk behind it

- Location within Amsterdam
- Location: Amsterdam
- Postal code: 1012
- Coordinates: 52.376169°N 4.901414°E

The Oudezijds Kolk is a short and narrow canal/lock in Amsterdam between the Oudezijds Voorburgwal and the Oosterdok.

== Location ==
The Oudezijds Kolk runs north from the junction of the Oudezijds Voorburgwal and Oudezijds Achterburgwal under the Zeedijk to the Open Havenfront, which connects to (the IJ) It is connected to the Geldersekade where it runs under the Prins Hendrikkade in the north. Via the Kolksluis (bridge 302), built at the beginning of the 15th century, it served as a drainage ditch to the IJ, now the Open Havenfront. The canal is connected to the Open Haven front via the Kolkswaterkering (bridge 301). The Oudezijds Kolk, often abbreviated to: OZ Kolk, has traditionally been called "Het Kolkje".

The Kolksluis (Kolk Sluice) has been operating since the Middle Ages. The Kolksluis, the lock, was in a vault of the Oudezijds Kolk. That was demolished in 1702 and replaced by the present bridge. During high tide, the lock is closed to protect flooding. The river Amstel continues to flow into the canals to the south, raising their level. When the tide drops, the lock is opened and the waters flow out to the sea. Through this spuien (sluicing) process the canal waters are kept fresh.

There is only one quay, on the southeast side, which is only for pedestrians. On the northwest side the buildings back directly onto the canal including the Basilica of Saint Nicholas, formerly St. Nicholas inside the Walls, and what was once a paint factory. There are several warehouses from the 17th and 18th centuries. The national monument Oudezijds Kolk 5, “Het wijnpakhuis Malaga” (Malaga wine warehouse), was built in 1617. It now holds privately owned apartments. The France Hotel Amsterdam is at Oudezijds Kolk 11.

== Gallery ==
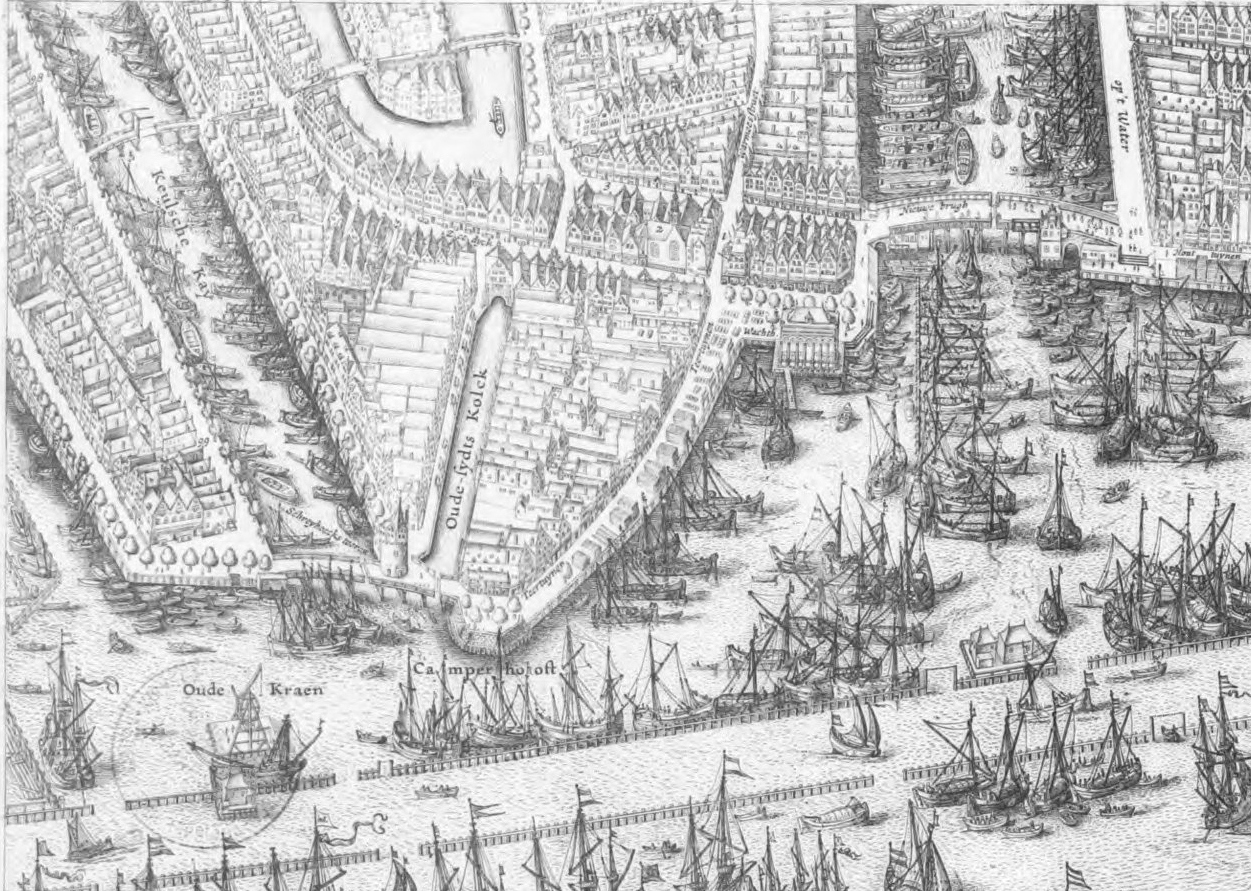
Oudezijds Kolk in 1625 running down the triangle of land to the left (east) of the mouth of the Amstel Damrak.

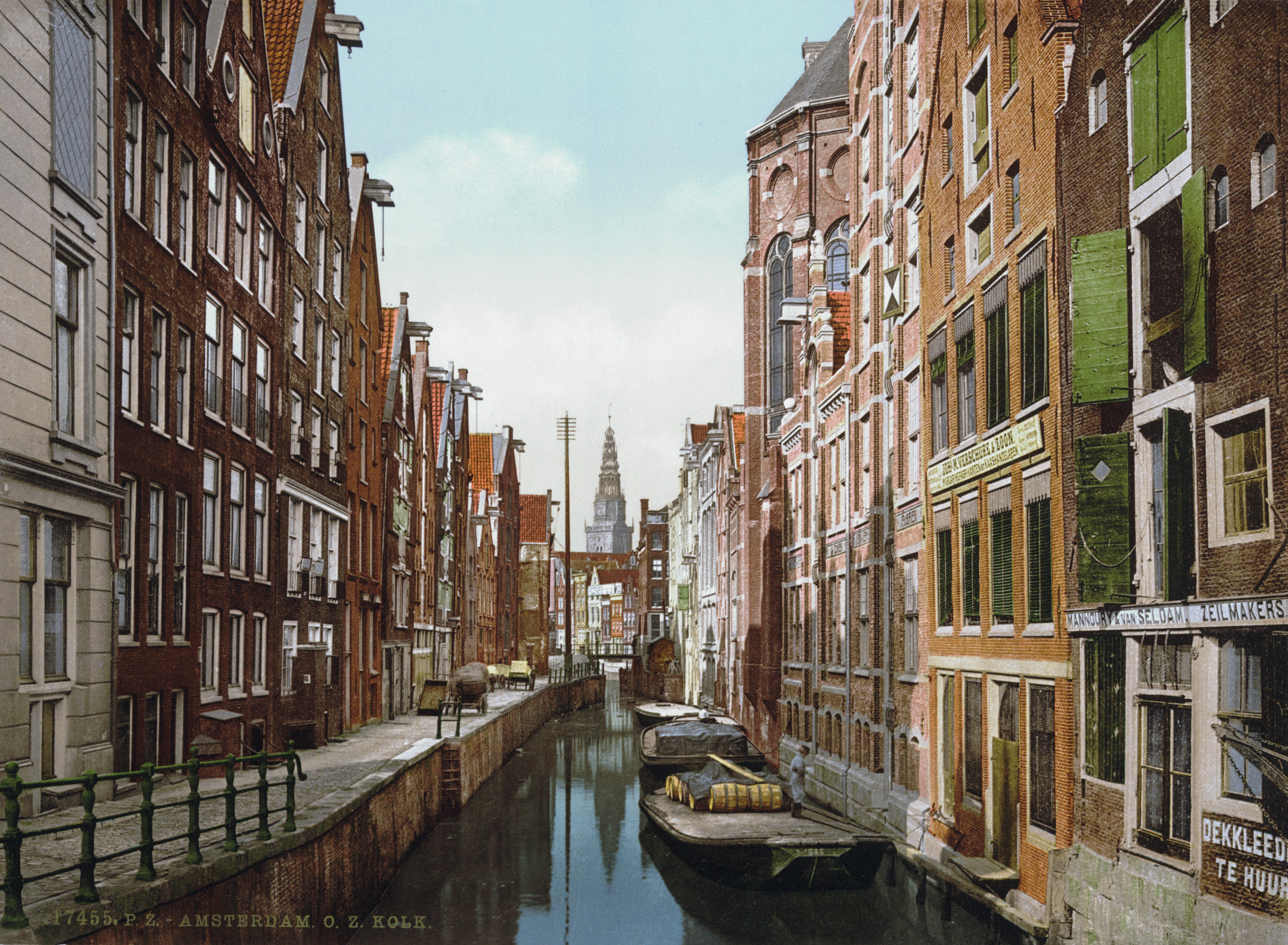
Oudezijds Kolk between 1890 and 1905

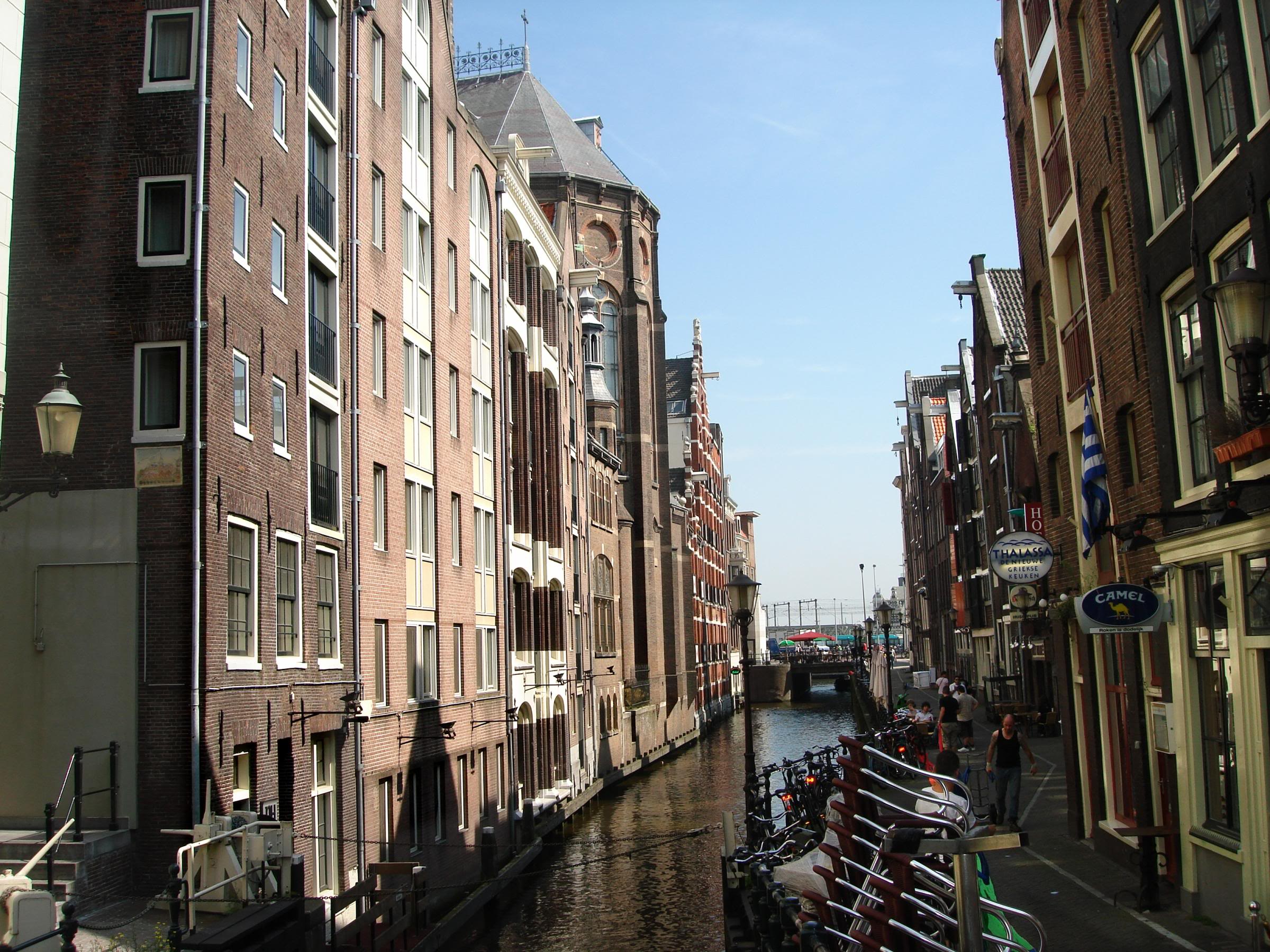
Oudezijds Kolk 2012 looking south to the Old Church

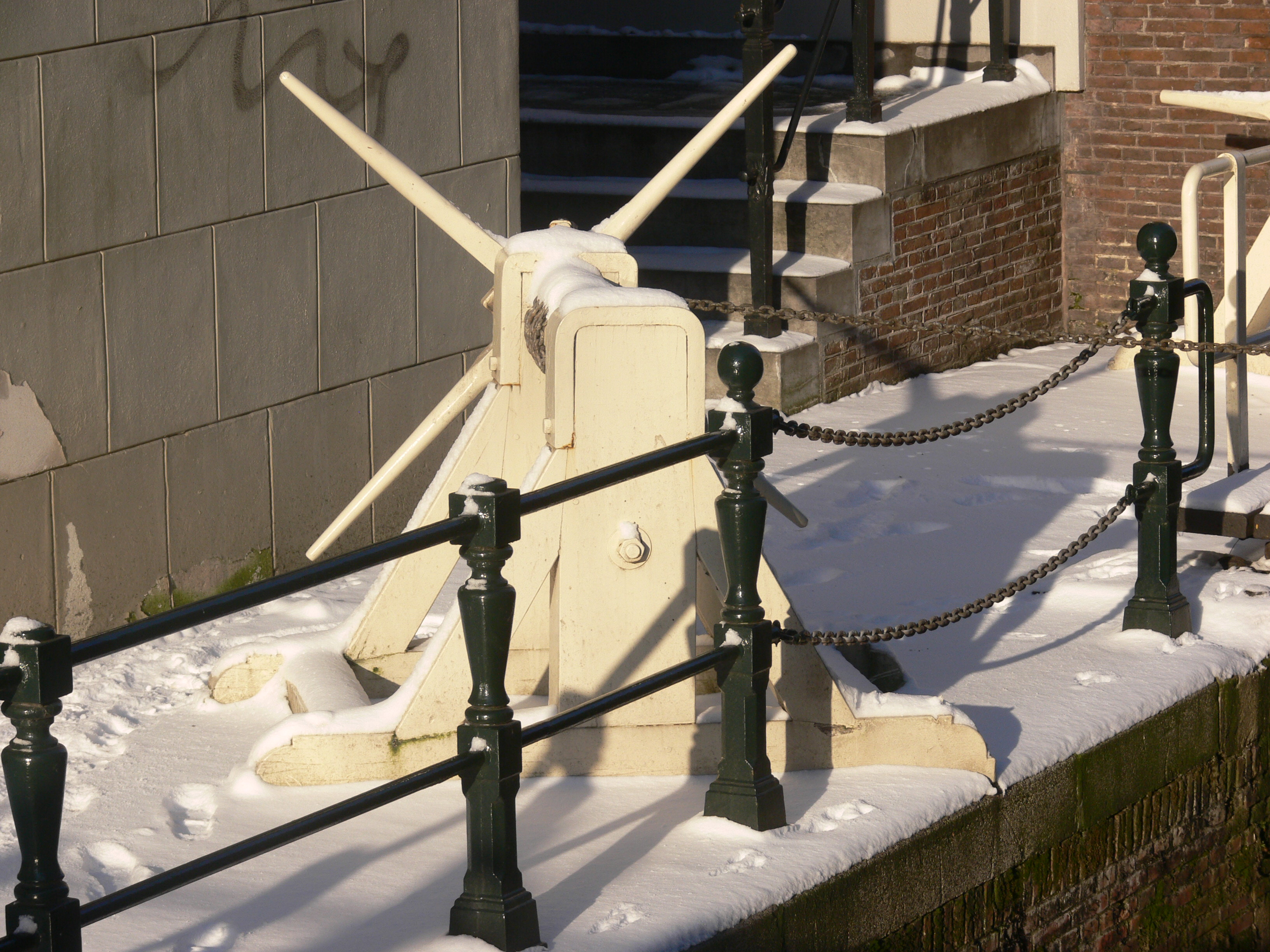
Lock mechanism

== See also ==
- Canals of Amsterdam

== Sources ==
- J. Kruizinga; Gerrit Vermeer (2002), Oudezijds Kolk of het Kolkje (in Dutch)
- Location France Hotel Amsterdam, France Hotel Amsterdam
- "Oudezijds Kolk", amsterdamoldtown.com
- "Oudezijds Kolk", cargocollective.com (in Dutch)
- "Oudezijds Kolk, one of Amsterdam's last sluices dating to the Middle Ages", DutchAmsterdam
