= Church of Saint John the Baptist (Pijnacker) =

Roman Catholic church in the Netherlands

H. Joannes de Dooperkerk
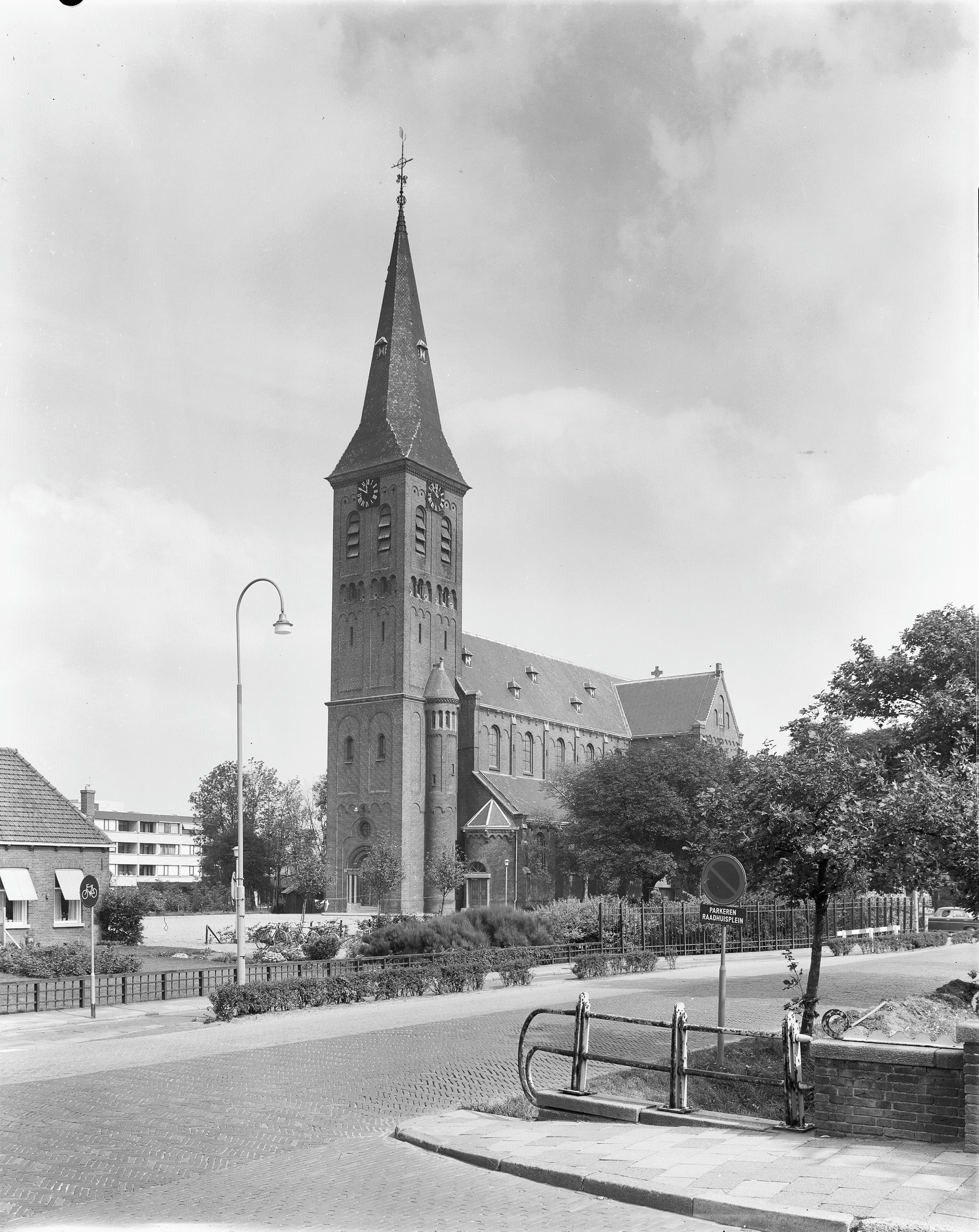
- Exterior of the church, September 1968

Religion
- Affiliation: Roman Catholic
- Province: South Holland
- Region: s-Gravenhage
- Rite: Latin Rite
- Ecclesiastical or organisational status: Parish church
- Leadership: Roman Catholic Diocese of Rotterdam
- Year consecrated: 1892
- Status: active use

Location
- Location: Oostlaan 38, Pijnacker, Netherlands
- Municipality: Pijnacker-Nootdorp
- Interactive map of H. Joannes de Dooperkerk
- Coordinates: 52°1′14.29″N 4°26′3.55″E

Architecture
- Architect: Adrianus Bleijs
- Style: neo-Romanesque
- Groundbreaking: 1891
- Completed: 1892

Specifications
- Direction of façade: west
- Spire: one
- Spire height: 181 feet
- Materials: brick

Website
- www.rk-pijnacker.nl

The church of Saint John the Baptist (or as written by the parish H. Joannes de Dooper or as a variant in Dutch Sint Johannes de Doper) is a Roman Catholic church in Pijnacker in the Netherlands. The church is cruciform and built in the neo-Romanesque style. It was built in 1892 and is the work of architect, Adrianus Bleijs.

When built it was within the Roman Catholic Diocese of Haarlem which was later renamed the Roman Catholic Diocese of Haarlem-Amsterdam. When diocesan boundaries were redrawn it became part of the Roman Catholic Diocese of Rotterdam. It The name of the church has several variations. The parish website officially shows it as "H. Joannes de Dooper," (with no "h" and with two "o"s) but others list it as Heilige (or Sint) Johannes de Doper (with an "h" and with only one "o.") Above the entrance door of the church is found a bas-relief showing the baptism of Jesus by John.

The organ was built in 1899 by P.J. Adema and Sons.

The church is a registered national monument along with the attached presbytery.

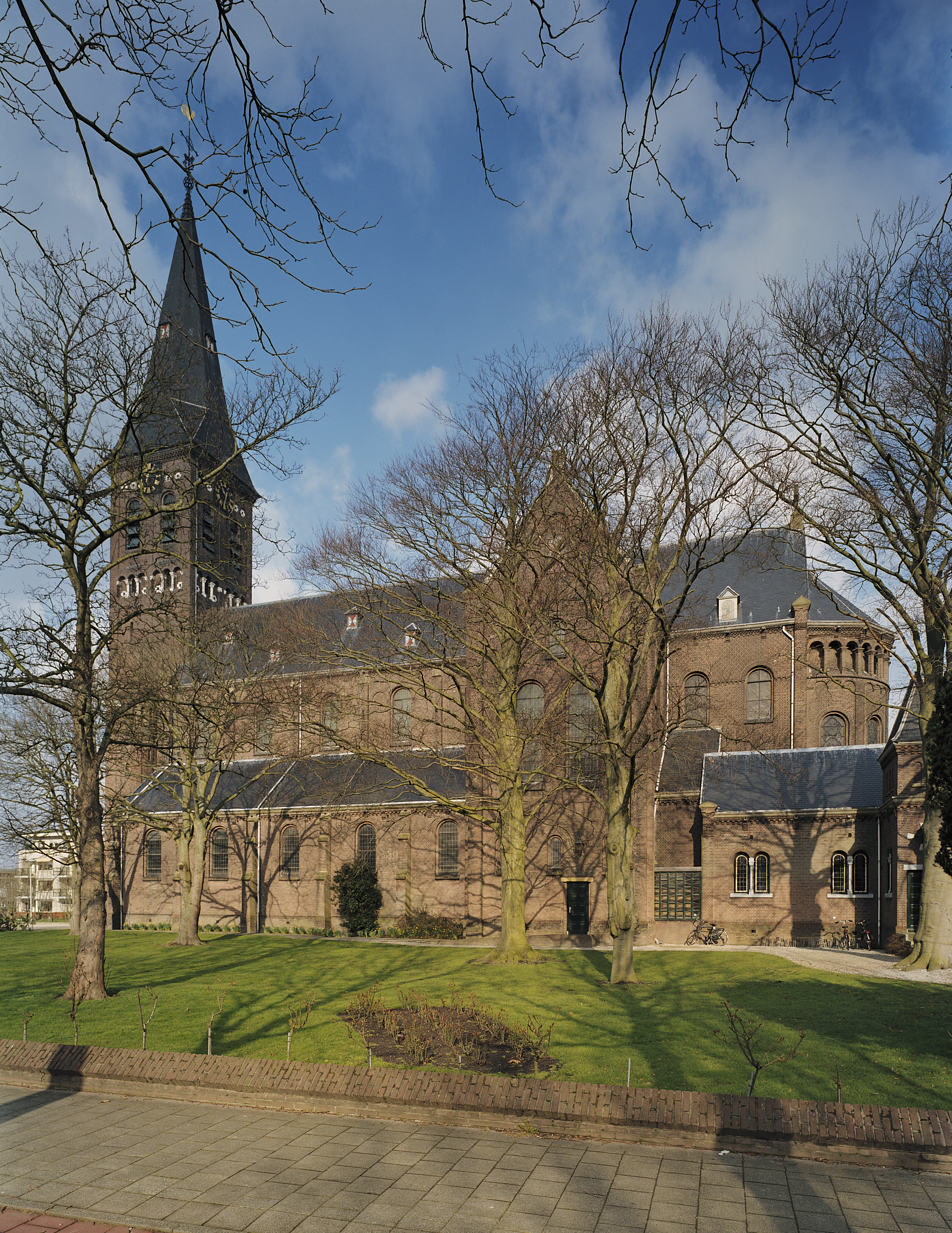
view of the church from the south along the Oostlaan.

== Gallery ==
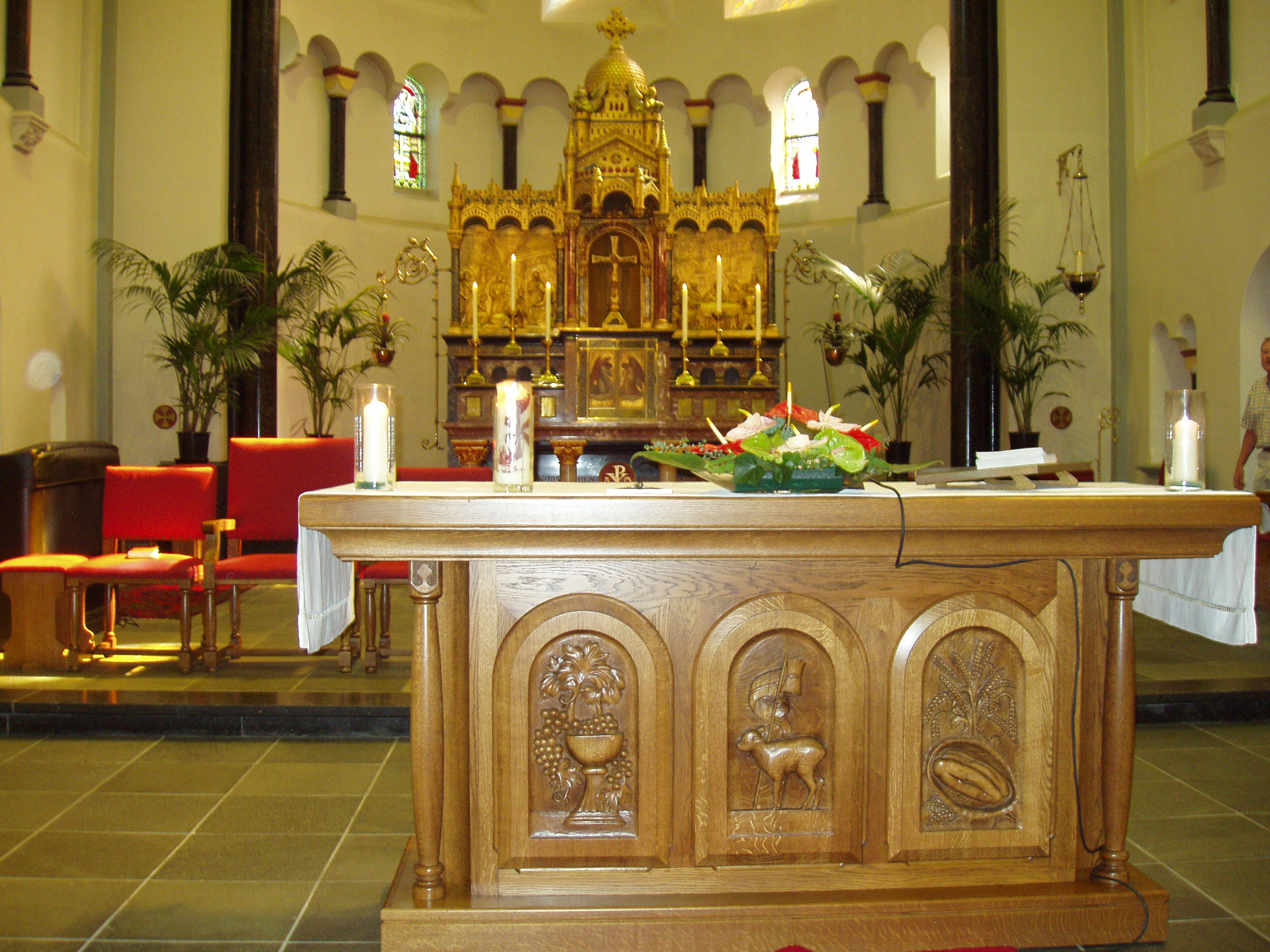
Interior close-up view of the sanctuary facing east

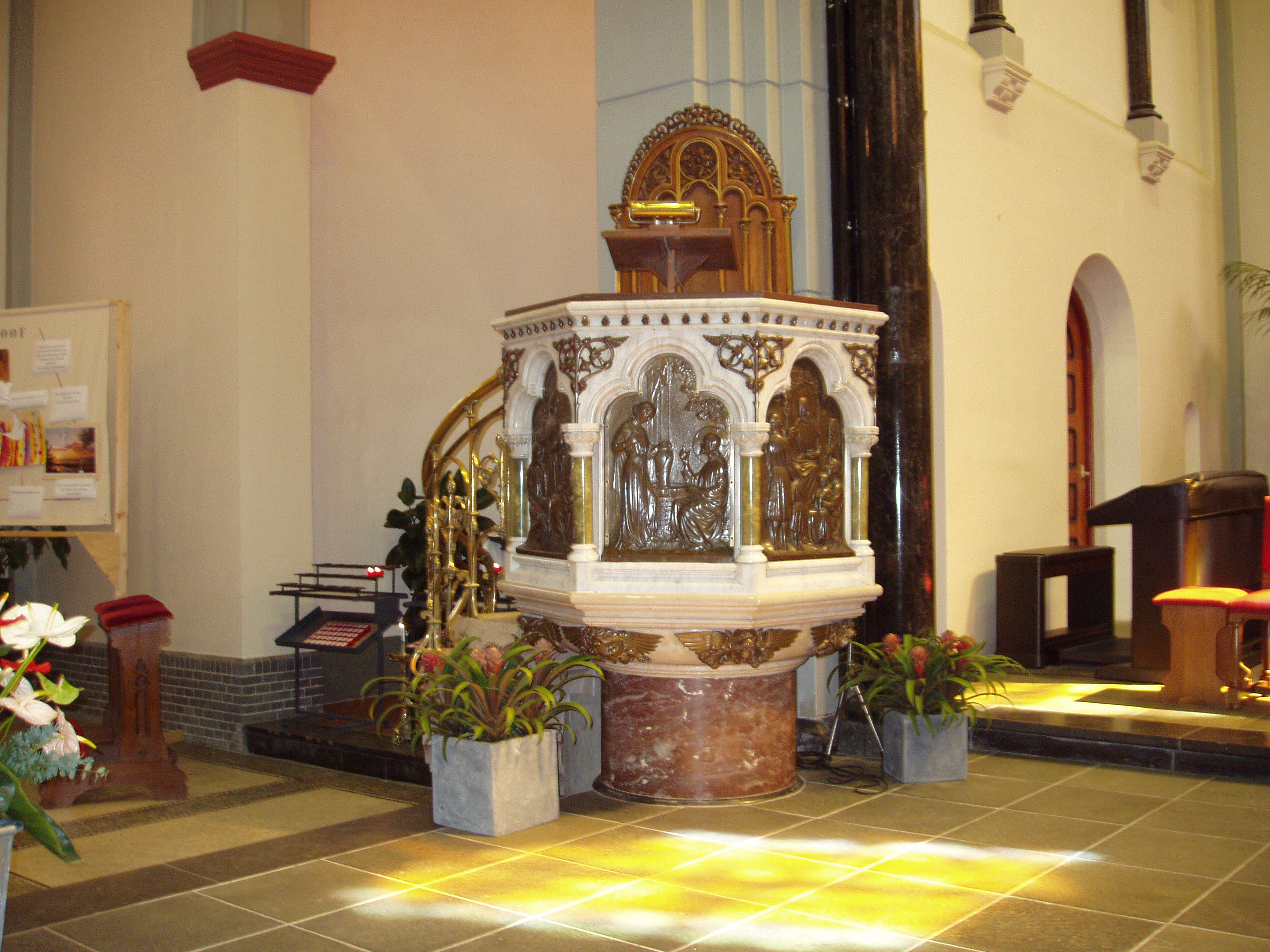
The ornate raised pulpit

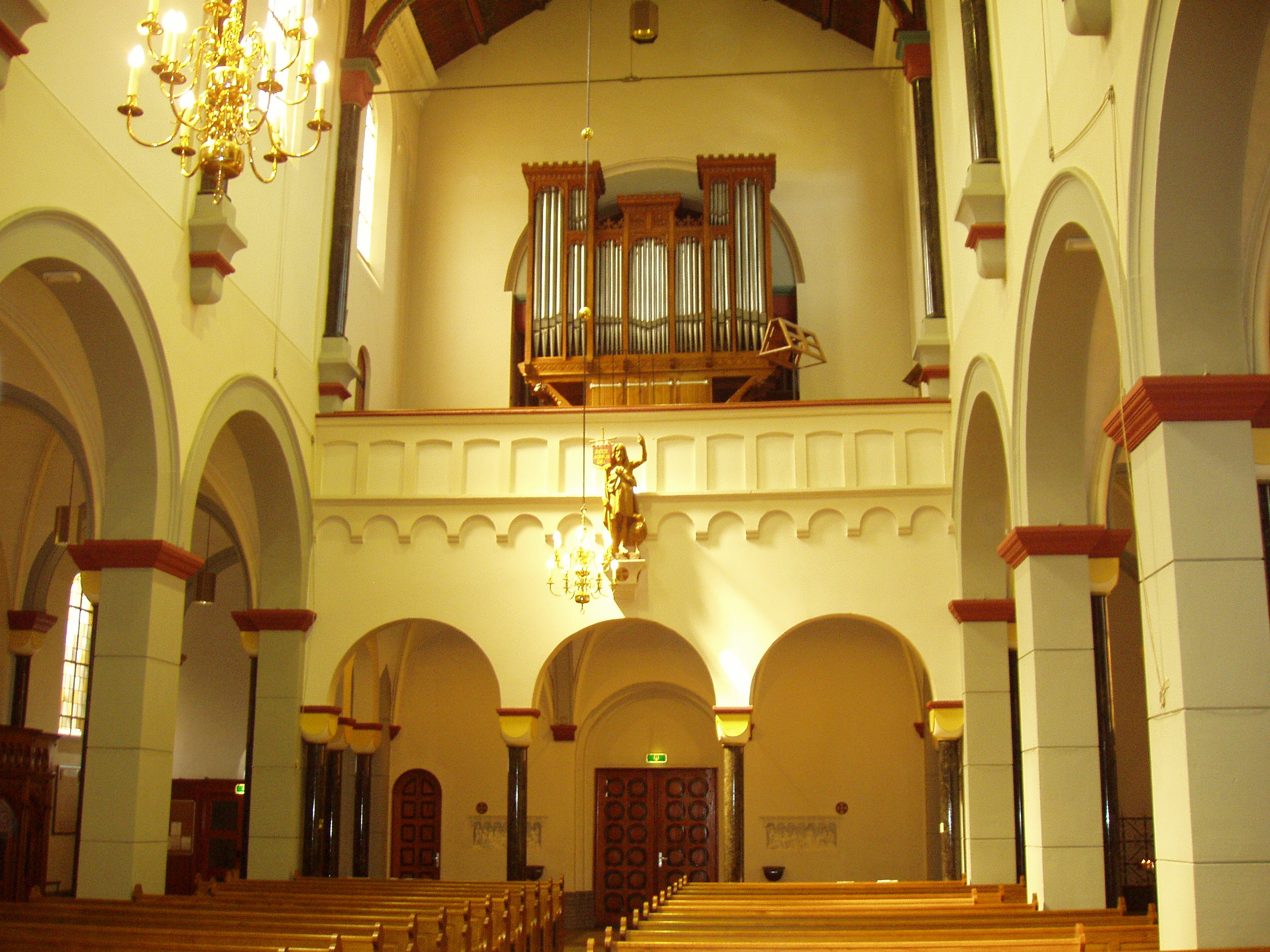
Interior view facing west towards the organ and loft

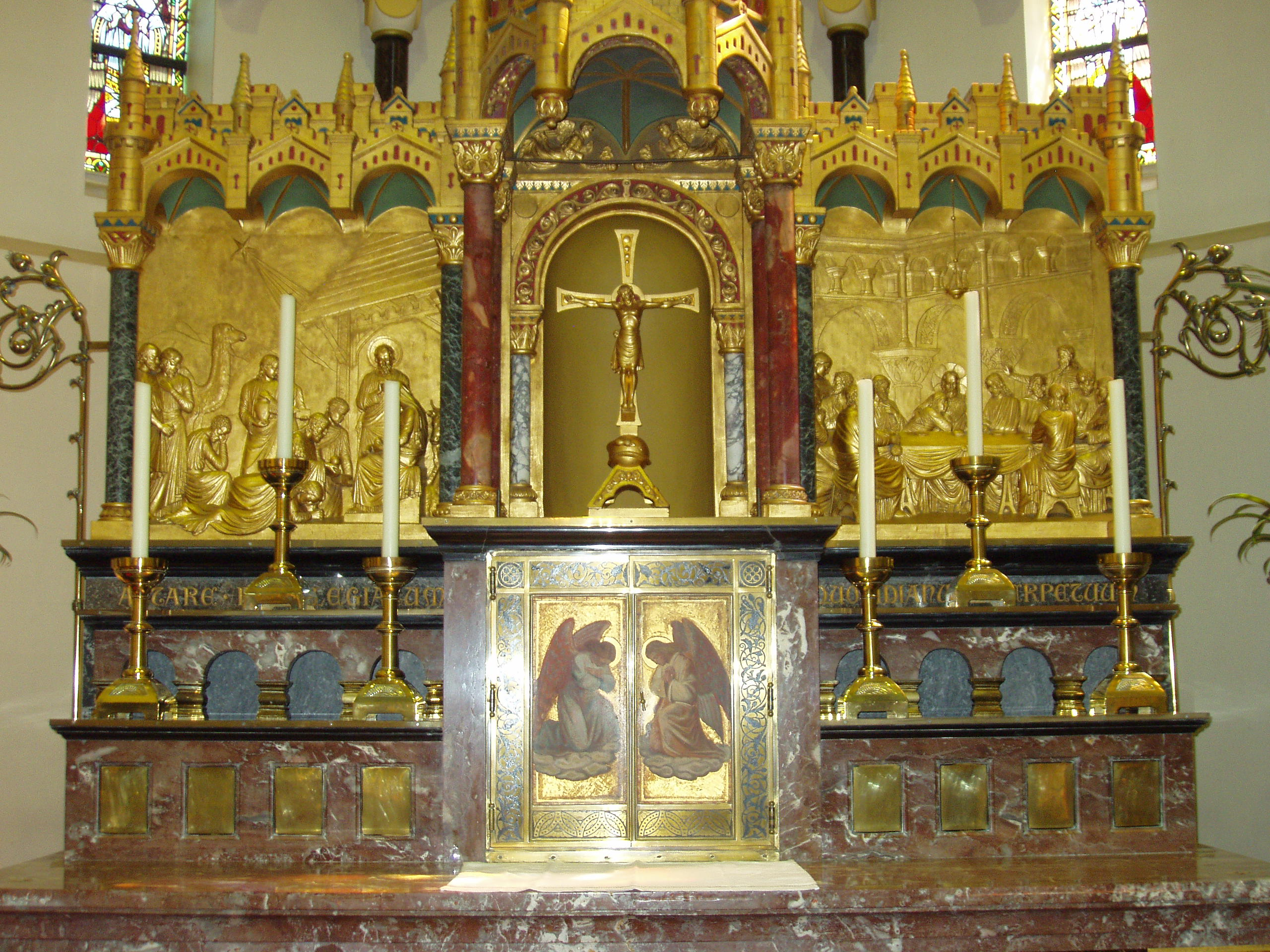
Close-up of the tabernacle and altarpiece

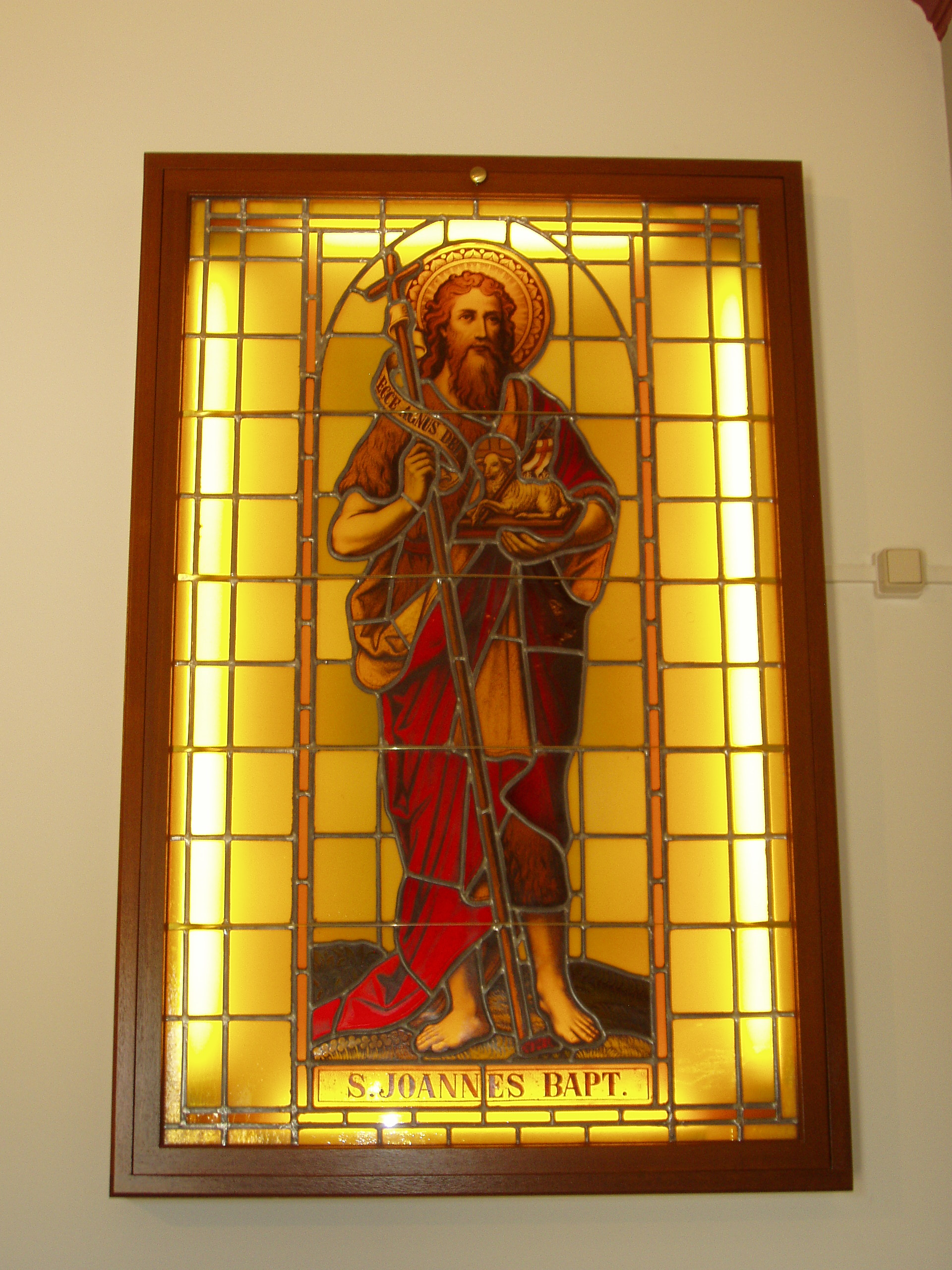
Saint John the Baptist stained glass window

== See also ==
- Catholic Church in the Netherlands
1. Book: "H. Joannes de Dooper - een eeuw rond het kerkgebouw 1892 -1992" (translation: Saint John the Baptist: a century around the church building 1892–1992). The book was published by the parish for its anniversary and gives a history of the building and the people of the parish with pictures of the pastors, as well as photos and stories of many of the parishioners who went on to be ordained to the priesthood or to religious life to serve the Catholic Church in many parts of the world.
