= Jan Stuyt =

Dutch architect (1868–1934)

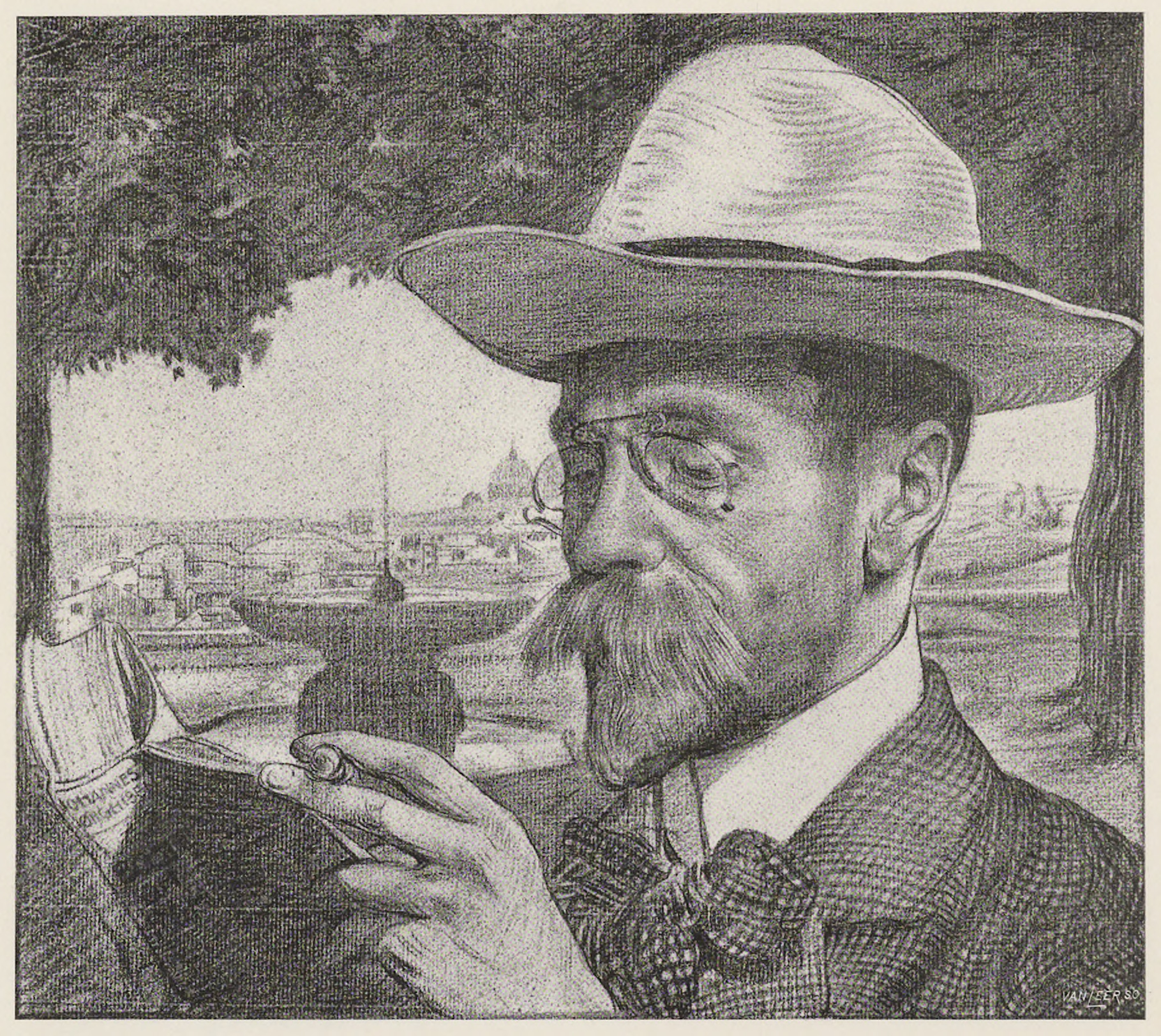
- Stuyt drawn by Huib Luns in 1906
- Born: August 21, 1868; Purmerend
- Died: July 11, 1934 (aged 65); The Hague
- Occupation: Architect
- Practice: Associated architectural firm[s]
- Buildings: Cenakelkerk

Jan Stuyt (21 August 1868, Purmerend - 11 July 1934, The Hague) was a Dutch architect.

== Childhood and Education ==
Stuyt was born the son of a cattle farmer. Due to the headmaster of his school, he was employed in 1883 at the office of Adrianus Bleijs (1842-1912), whose neo-Romanesque style would strongly influence Stuyt's work.

== Career ==
In 1891 Stuyt joined the Cuypers office in Amsterdam, where he became an overseer of the building of the Cathedral of Saint Bavo in Haarlem between 1895 and 1898. He then had a short career as an independent architect, during which he built his first church.

In 1899 Stuyt formed a partnership with Joseph Cuypers, son of Pierre Cuypers, which lasted until 1909. It seems that the architects in this period mostly worked on their own. Jan Stuyt mostly designed neo-Romanesque churches, often decorated with chessboard-like tile-decorations, which are present in many of the churches both during and after the partnership. Cuypers chose a more neo-Gothic approach, closely related to the work of his father.

Stuyt's style was greatly influenced by Mediterranean (Italian, Byzantine, Islamic) architecture after his participation in the first Dutch pilgrimage to Palestine in 1903. Several of his most important churches were dome-churches, shaped after the Hagia Sophia in Constantinople. His less prestigious designs were often executed in a simple neo-Romanesque style, combining standard elements.

Besides churches Stuyt designed various other buildings and was also active in town planning, especially in the city of Heerlen. He was an architect for housing corporation Ons Limburg and in that function designed the Molenberg neighbourhood. In his profane designs influences from (neo-)Classicism and the work of K.P.C. de Bazel are apparent.

== Stuyt Jr. ==
After Stuyt's death, his son Giacomo C. Stuyt continued the office for several years, apparently with considerably less success, before becoming a diplomat. His first and best known work is the church of St. Paulus in Utrecht of 1937, which has been demolished already.

Another son of Jan Stuyt, Louis Stuyt became physician and Dutch Minister of Health and Environment.

== List of Designs ==
Note: Not all his designs were actually built. Designs during his work together with Joseph Cuypers, between 1899-1909 are not listed here.

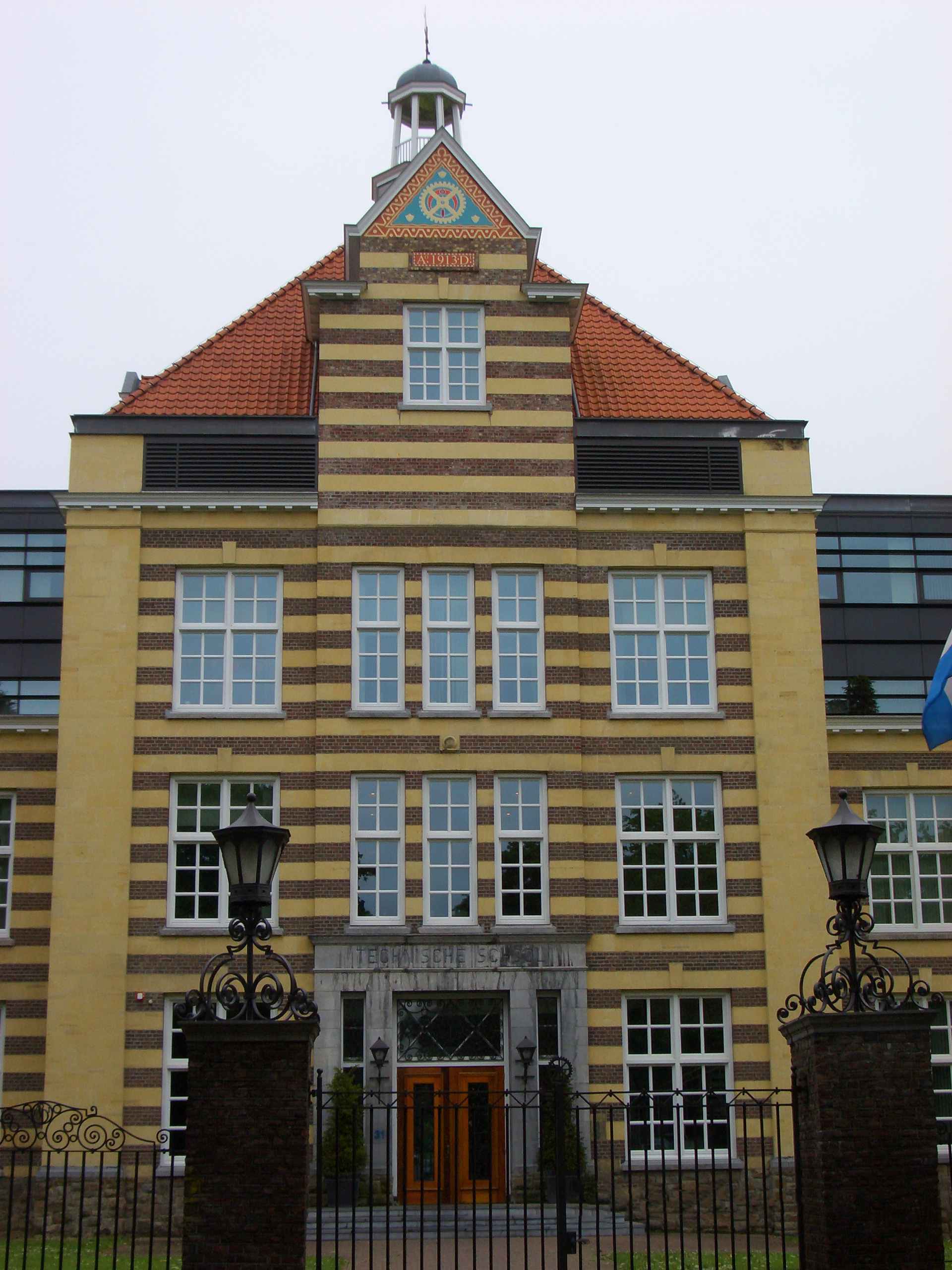
Entrance to the Ambachtsschool in Heerlen

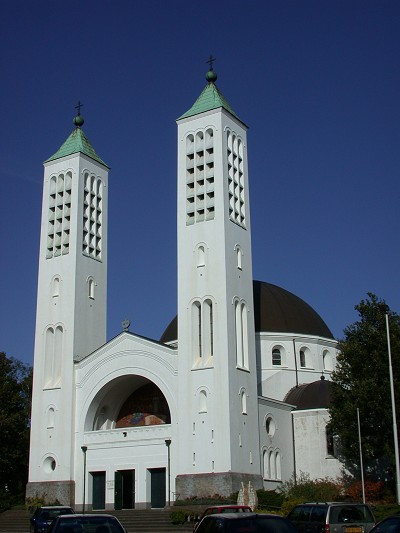
Church in Heilig Landstichting

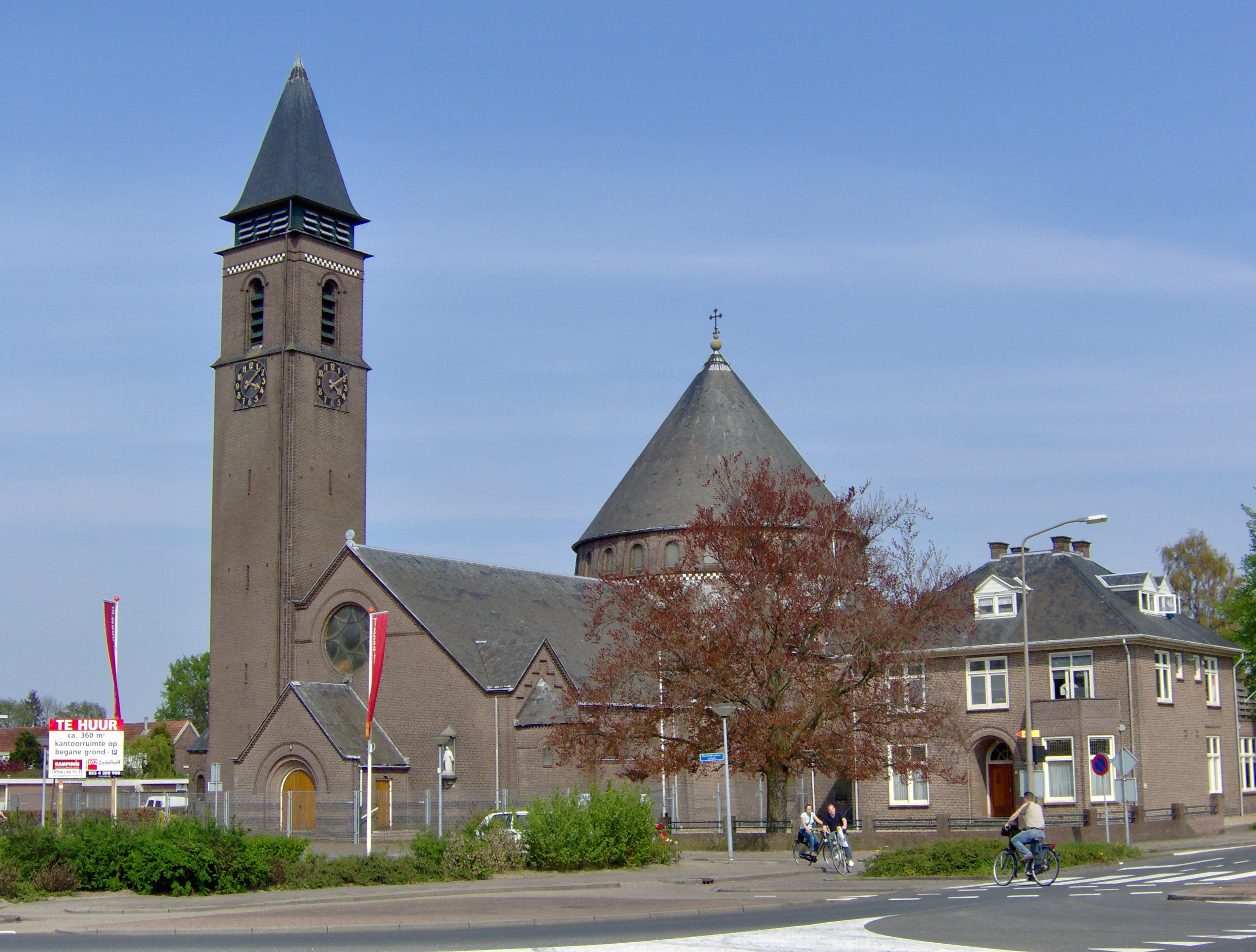
Church of St. Egbertus in Almelo

- 1898 Design for a church in Lodz, Russian Poland
- 1899 Design for a church in Copenhagen, Denmark
- 1899-1900 Sloten: church St. Pancratius
- 1906 Zeelst: church tower of St. Willibrordus
- 1907 Weebosch: church of St. Gerardus Majella.
- 1908 Wijkeroog: church of St. Jozef
- 1909 Eindhoven: office-building for Coöperatieve Centrale Boerenleenbank
- 1909 Eindhoven: Director's house
- 1910 Berkel-Enschot: church of St. Willibrordus
- 1911-1913 Alkmaar: restoration of town hall
- 1911 Naarden: church of St. Vitus
- 1911 Overloon: church of St. Theobaldus
- 1911 Klein-Zundert: church of St. Willibrordus
- 1911 Heemskerk: town hall
- 1912-1913 Bergen op Zoom: church of St. Joseph
- 1912 Purmerend: town hall
- 1913 Rotterdam: design for town hall
- 1913-1915 Heilig Landstichting: Cenakelkerk church
- 1913-1914 Terborg: church of St. Gregorius
- 1913 Groningen: H. Hartkerk church
- 1913 Heiloo: church of O.L.V. ter Nood
- 1913 Heerlen: Ambachtsschool (later called Technische School (Technical school)), located at 50.883745°N 5.974638°E
- 1913 Hoensbroek: De Eerste Stap housing complex
- 1914-1916 's-Hertogenbosch: Drukkerij Teulings (now called De Bindery)
- 1915-1930 Heerlen: Molenberg
- 1915-1916 Maarn: Huis te Maarn
- 1915 Zoetermeer: church of St. Nicolaas
- 1915 Wormerveer: church of H. Maria Geboorte
- 1916-1917 's-Hertogenbosch: church of St. Catharina
- 1916-1917 Eindhoven: church of St. Anthonius van Padua
- 1916 Harmelen: church of St. Bavo
- 1917-1920 Brunssum: De Rozengaard garden village
- 1917-1918 Mariaparochie: church of O.L. Vrouwe van Altijddurende Bijstand
- 1917 Voerendaal: enlargement church of St. Laurentius
- 1918-1919 Geleen: AW Kolonie
- 1919-1922 Heemstede: Hageveld seminary
- 1919 IJsselmuiden: church of O.L. Vrouwe Onbevlekt Ontvangen
- 1920-1922 Heerlen: Vroedvrouwenschool (School for midwives)
- 1920 Amsterdam: church of St. Agnes
- 1921-1922 Den Haag: church of the Heilige Familie
- 1921-1924 Wierden: church of St. Johannes de Doper
- 1921 Brielle: ciborium
- 1921 Den Haag: design of House of Representatives
- 1922-1924 Almelo: church of St. Egbertus
- 1922-1924 Den Haag: church of St. Gerardus Majella
- 1923-1926 Amsterdam: church of St. Gerardus Majella
- 1923 Egmond a/d Hoef: church of H. Margarita Maria Alacoque
- 1925-1927 Zundert: church of St. Trudo
- 1925-1926 Geesteren: church of St. Pancratius
- 1925 Alkmaar: St. Elisabeth hospital
- 1926 Koningsbosch: church of O.L. Vrouw Onbevlekt Ontvangen
- 1926-1928 Nijmegen: Neboklooster
- 1926-1928 Almelo: St. Elisabeth hospital
- 1926-1927 Enschede: church O.L. Vrouwe van Altijddurende Bijstand
- 1927 Hillegom: church St. Joseph
- 1927 Heiloo: church St. Willibrordus
- 1928 De Steeg: church O.L. Vrouwe Hemelvaart
- 1928-1929 Zevenbergen: church of St. Bartholomeus
- 1929-1930 Dommelen: extension to church of St. Martinus
- 1930 Warmond: Philosophicum
- 1930 Heiloo: pilgrimage chapel of Onze Lieve Vrouwe ter Nood
- 1930-1931 Lisse: church of H.H. Engelbewaarders
- 1931-1932 Keijenborg: church of St. Johannes de Doper
- 1932 Valkenswaard: church of St. Nicolaas
- 1933 Rome: Building for the Nederlands Instituut
- 1934 Heerlen: Chapel for the Vroedvrouwenschool (School for midwives)

=== Year unknown ===
- Aerdenhout: houses Onder de Beuken, De Distel, Vredehove
- Hazerswoude-Rijnsdijk: Lidwinagesticht
- Overveen: houses
- Rio de Janeiro: design for church of St. Andreas
- Rijswijk: school
- Rolduc: extension to seminary

== Sources ==
Architects: Jan Stuyt (1868-1934) at www.archimon.nl
