= Molenberg =

Coordinates: 50°53′04″N 5°59′44″E

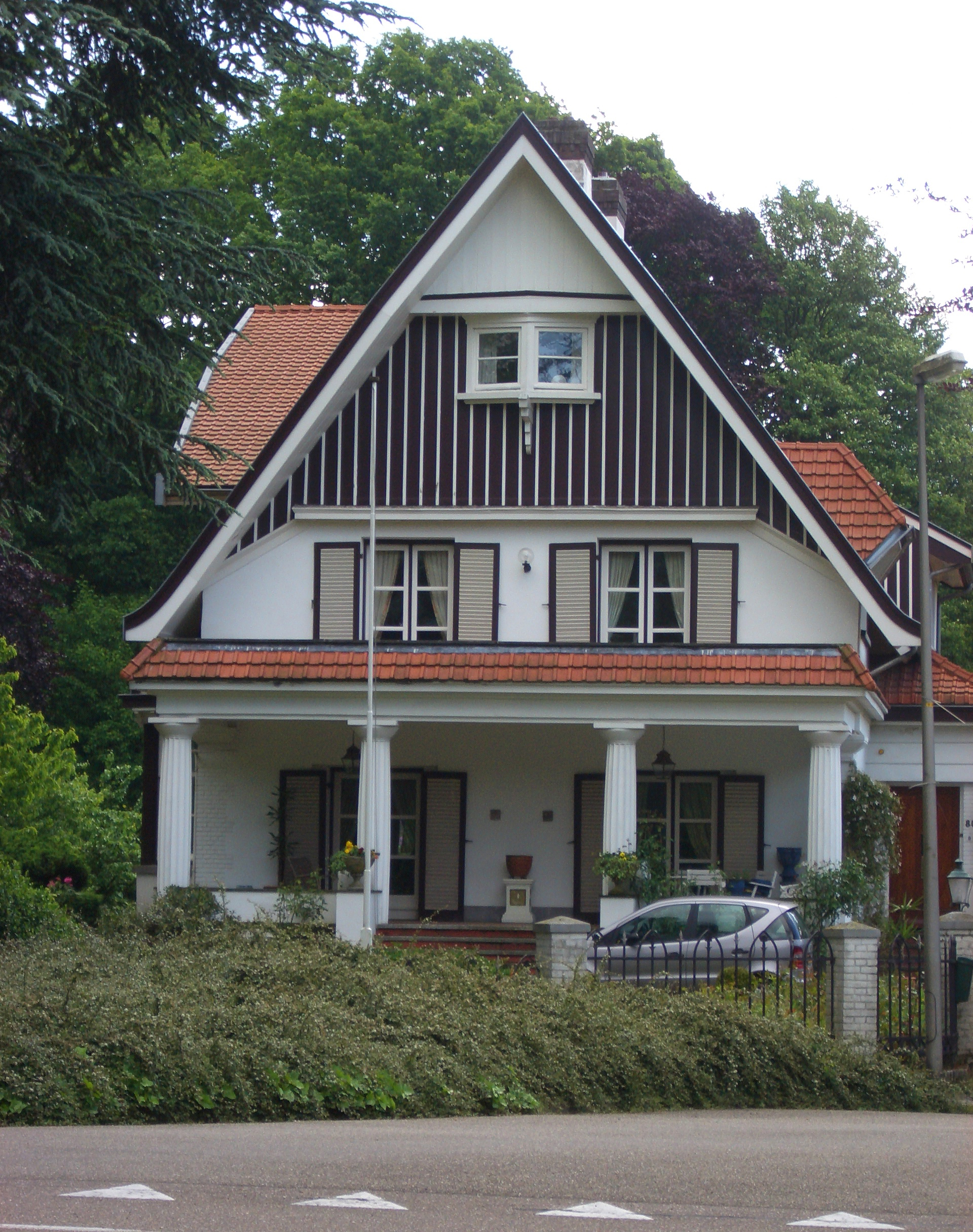
Land house attorney Wijnands (Frits Peutz, 1919), at the bottom of the Molenberglaan

Molenberg (literally Millhill) is a former mining colony in the south-western part of Heerlen, southeastern Netherlands.

When work started in 1913 it was called Molenbergpark (Millhillpark).

The mining colony was created to house mining executives (alongside the slope of the hill, towards the centre of Heerlen), engineers (alongside the main road), and miners.

Although much of the planological work was done by architect Jan Stuyt, there were also buildings designed by Frits Peutz (Land house attorney Wijnands, 1919, the Broederschool (school building) 1921, Kapel Broederhuis, 1932), Theo Boosten (church Pius X (now demolished), 1961), and C. Franssen & J. Franssen (church Verschijning van de Onbevlekte Maagd, 1926).

The first houses were completed in 1916, in 1918 a second project was started, and between 1928 and 1938 the centre of Molenberg was built.

In 1951 the construction of another part was started, called the "Witte Wijk", designed by Jos Klijnen.
