= Adrianus Bleijs =

Dutch architect and painter

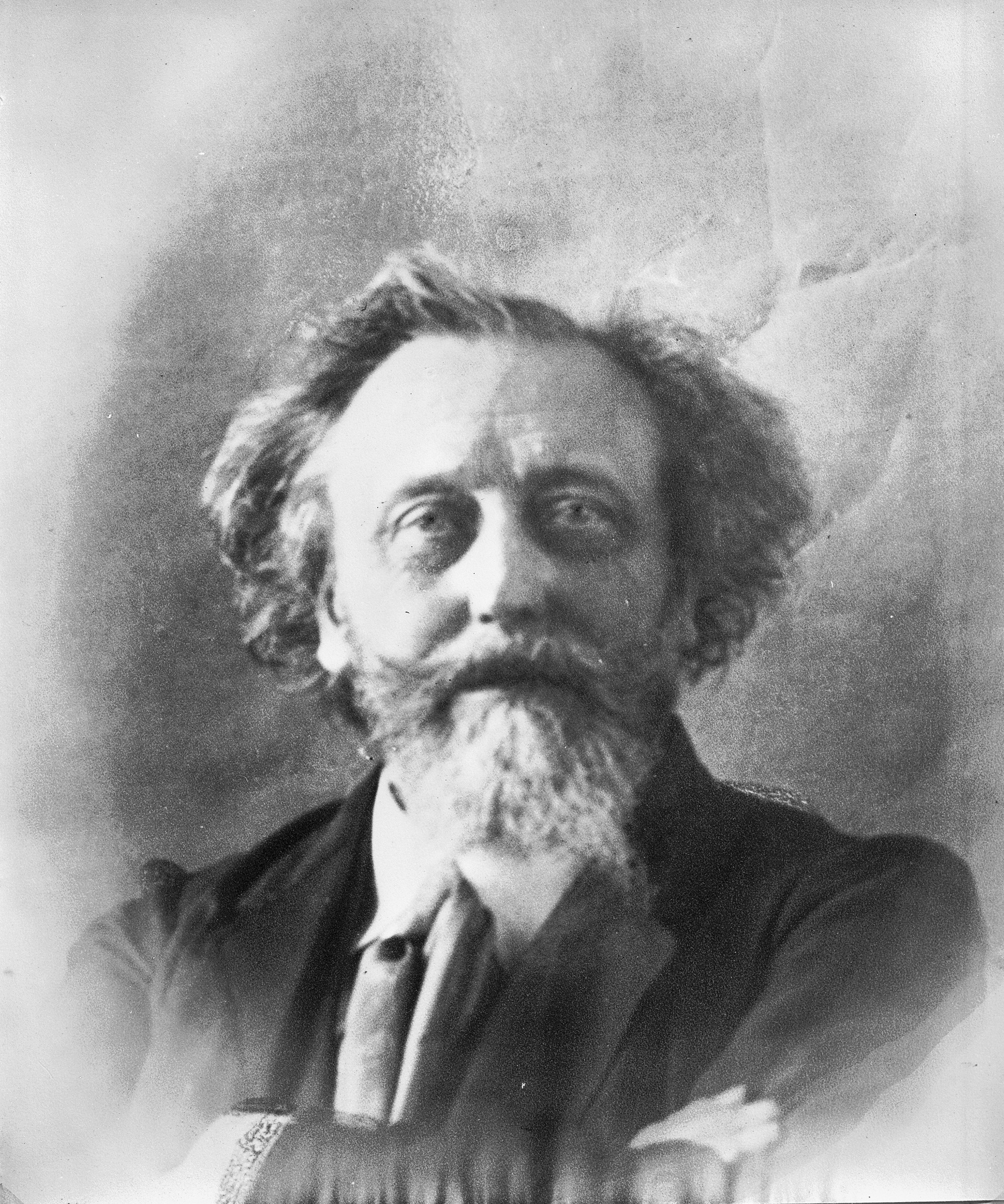
A. C. Bleijs

Adrianus Cyriacus Bleijs (29 March 1842, Hoorn - 12 January 1912, Kerkdriel) also known as A.C. Bleijs or, incorrectly, as A.C. Bleys, was a Dutch architect and painter who is primarily known for designing several Catholic churches.

== Life ==
Bleijs was born in Hoorn as the son of Johannes and Johanna Krijgsman Bleijs. His father was a master carpenter who built several houses in that town. Bleijs was trained in architectural skills by architect B. Blanken and engineer H. Linse. In November 1859 he moved to Roermond to join P.J.H. Cuypers’ firm.

After a conflict with Cuypers in 1861, for which he refused to apologize, he was forced to leave Cuypers’ firm, although Bleijs later denied this was the reason for his departure. Cuypers was a great proponent of the neo-Gothic, while Bleijs was interested in a variety of styles.

He went to Antwerp to pursue his further education at the Royal Academy of Fine Arts, where in 1862 he was the first winner of the Premier Prix d'Excellence for architecture and where he graduated in 1864. After graduation he returned to Hoorn and started his own office. In 1867 he married Bregitta Maria Witte; they had twelve children. In the early years, he received few assignments, but after 1870 the number of commissions increased. These were of a very diverse nature: he designed houses, warehouses, factories, residential and commercial buildings, churches, schools, asylums, cemeteries, a concert and theater hall, etc. Bleijs developed into the expert in the field of shop architecture. From 1876 to 1880 he served as a regent for a Roman Catholic orphanage in Hoorn.

In 1880 he moved to Amsterdam, where he became a board member of the architects' association in 1887. He also became a board member of 'Arti et Amicitiae ', an association of visual artists and art lovers, and served on the Amsterdam city council.

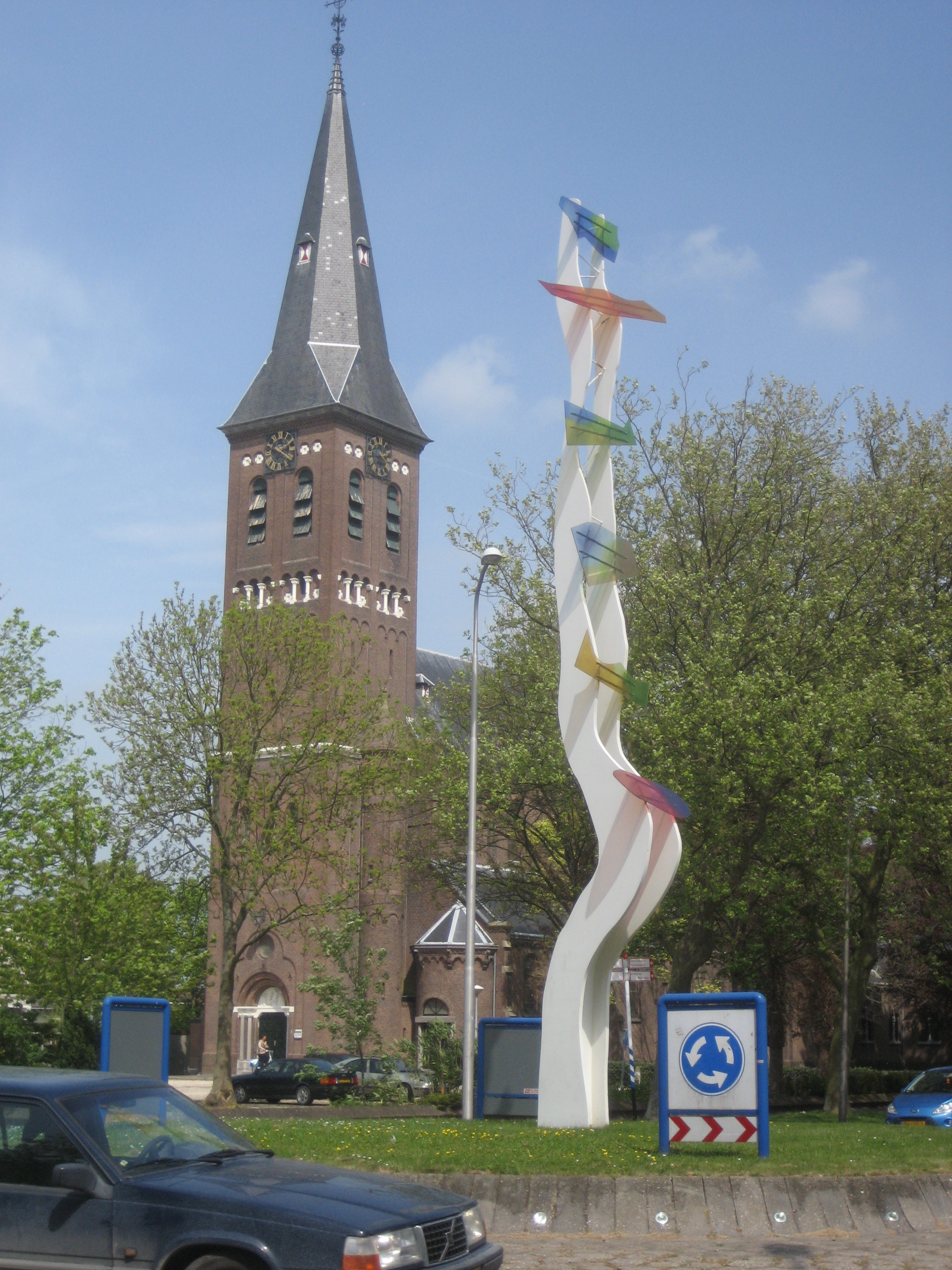
Church of Saint John the Baptist (Pijnacker)

After ca. 1900 no further assignments came, and he was grieving the loss of his son Alexander, who he had intended to succeed him. In 1903 Bleijs closed his office and became a civil servant in 's-Hertogenbosch. He was an inspector for public health, in charge of compliance with the legal provisions regarding public housing in North Brabant, Gelderland and Limburg.

He died in Kerkdriel and after a funeral mass at the St. Nicholas Church in Amsterdam. He was buried at the Catholic cemetery De Liefde.

== Style ==
For a Catholic architect of that period, Bleijs was unusually eclectic. He did not limit himself to the dominant neo-Gothic style but designed several churches in neo-Romanesque and neo-Renaissance style as well, despite the latter style being controversial in Catholic circles for its supposedly Protestant character. He also designed several neoclassical villas, and mansions in second-Empire style, a style that was in vogue during his student years in Antwerp. Sometimes he drew several designs in different styles for an assignment, from which the client could choose. Other times he combined elements from various style periods in one design (eclectic style).

Besides fourteen churches he designed, among other things, two Amsterdam hospitals. His best known work is the St. Nicolas Church in Amsterdam. Among his students were such notable architects as Willem Kromhout and Jan Stuyt.

== Works ==
- Sint-Dionysiuskerk, Heerhugowaard (1868) demolished 1963
- St. Cunerakerk, Nibbixwoud (1875)
- SS. Cyriacus and Franciscus Church and rectory, Hoorn (1880)
- St. Nicolas Church, Amsterdam (1887)
- Church of Saint John the Baptist (Pijnacker) (1892)
- Sint Willibrorduskerk, Rhoon (1893)
- St. Elizabeth Asylum, Amsterdam
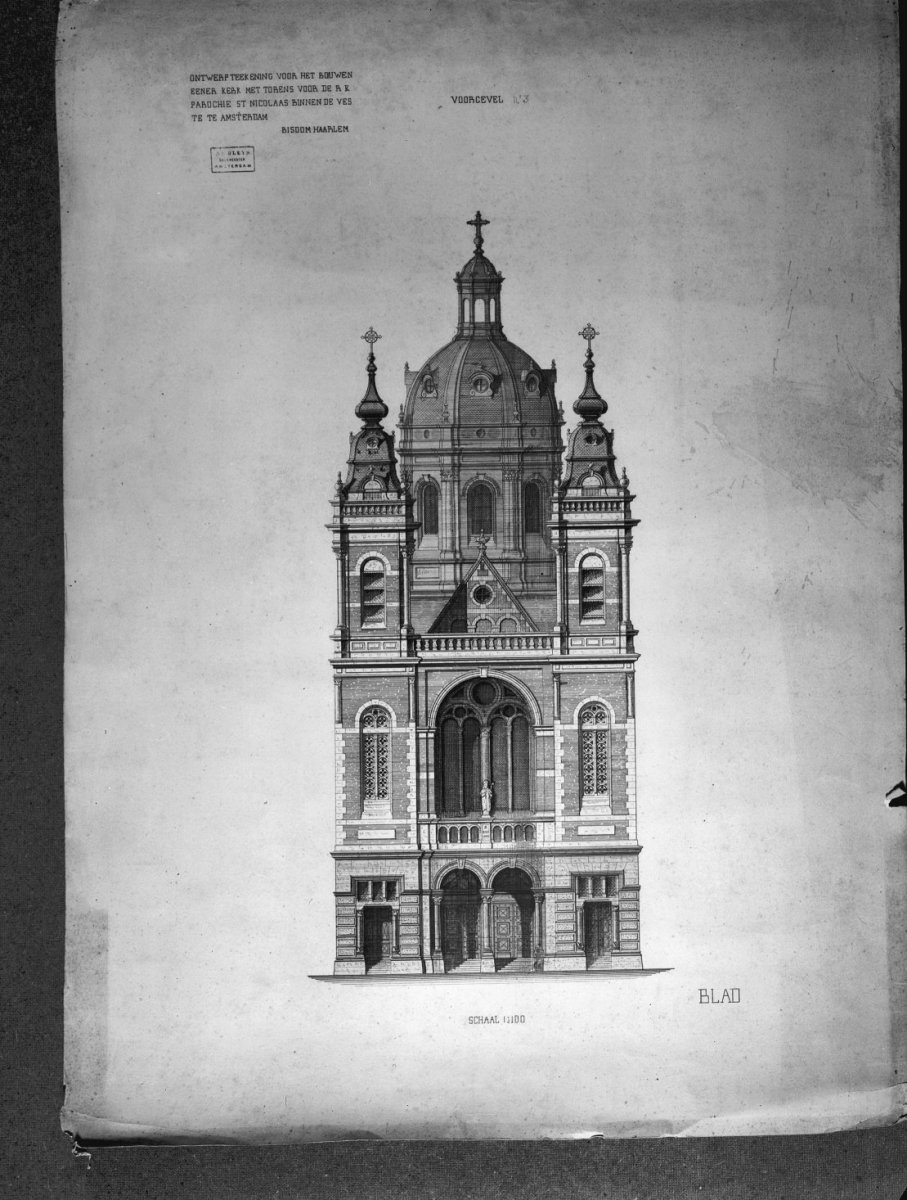
Architectural drawings, St. Nicholas Church

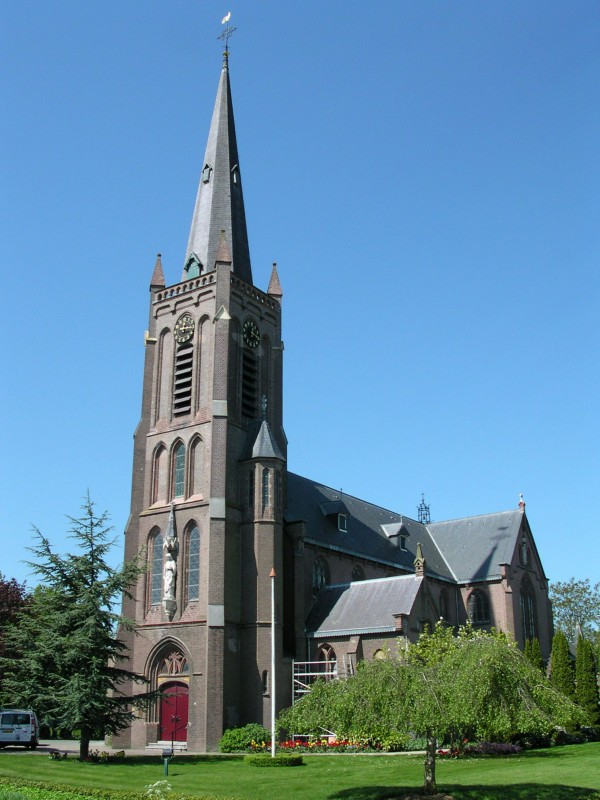
St. Cunerakerk, Nibbixwoud

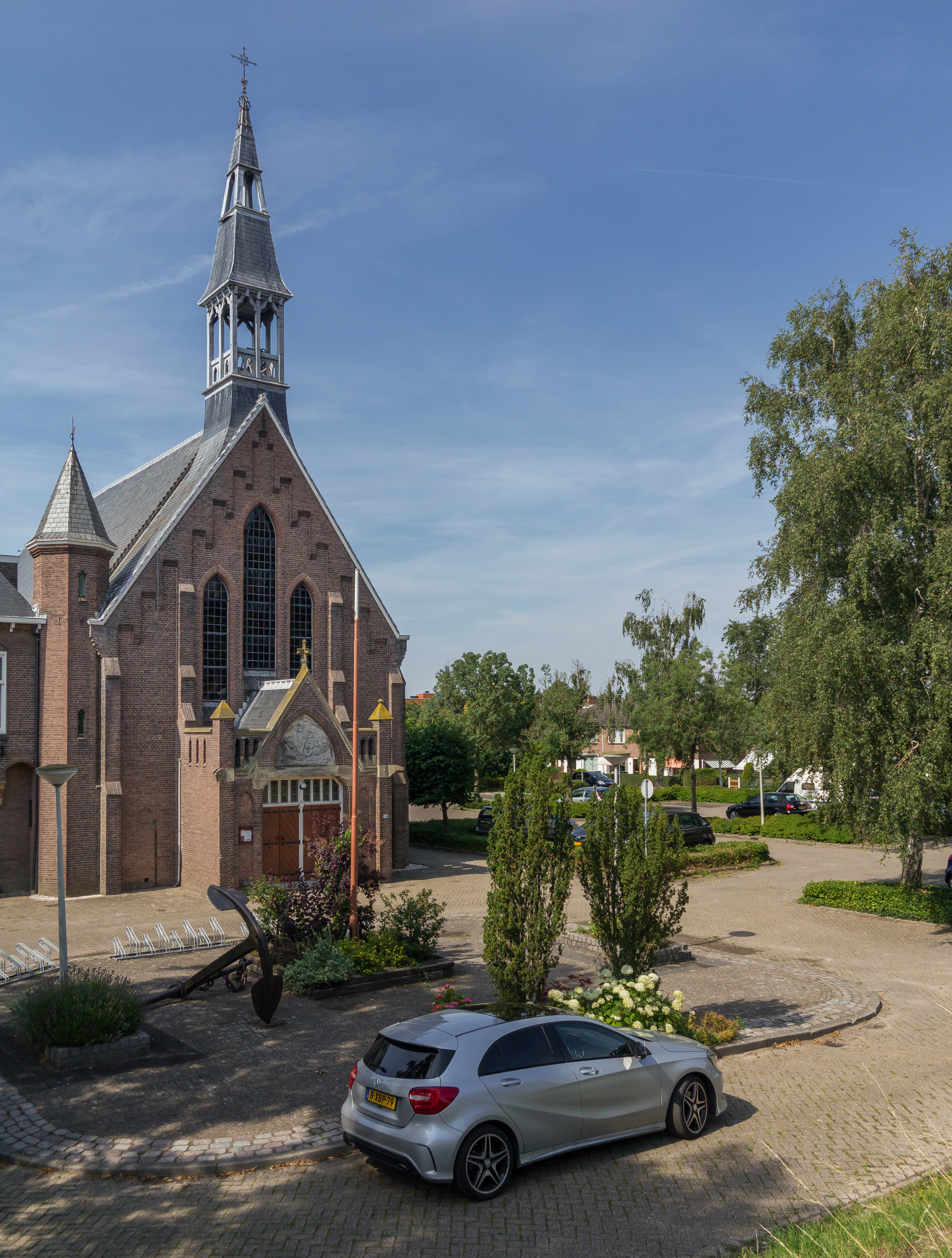
Sint Willibrorduskerk, Rhoon

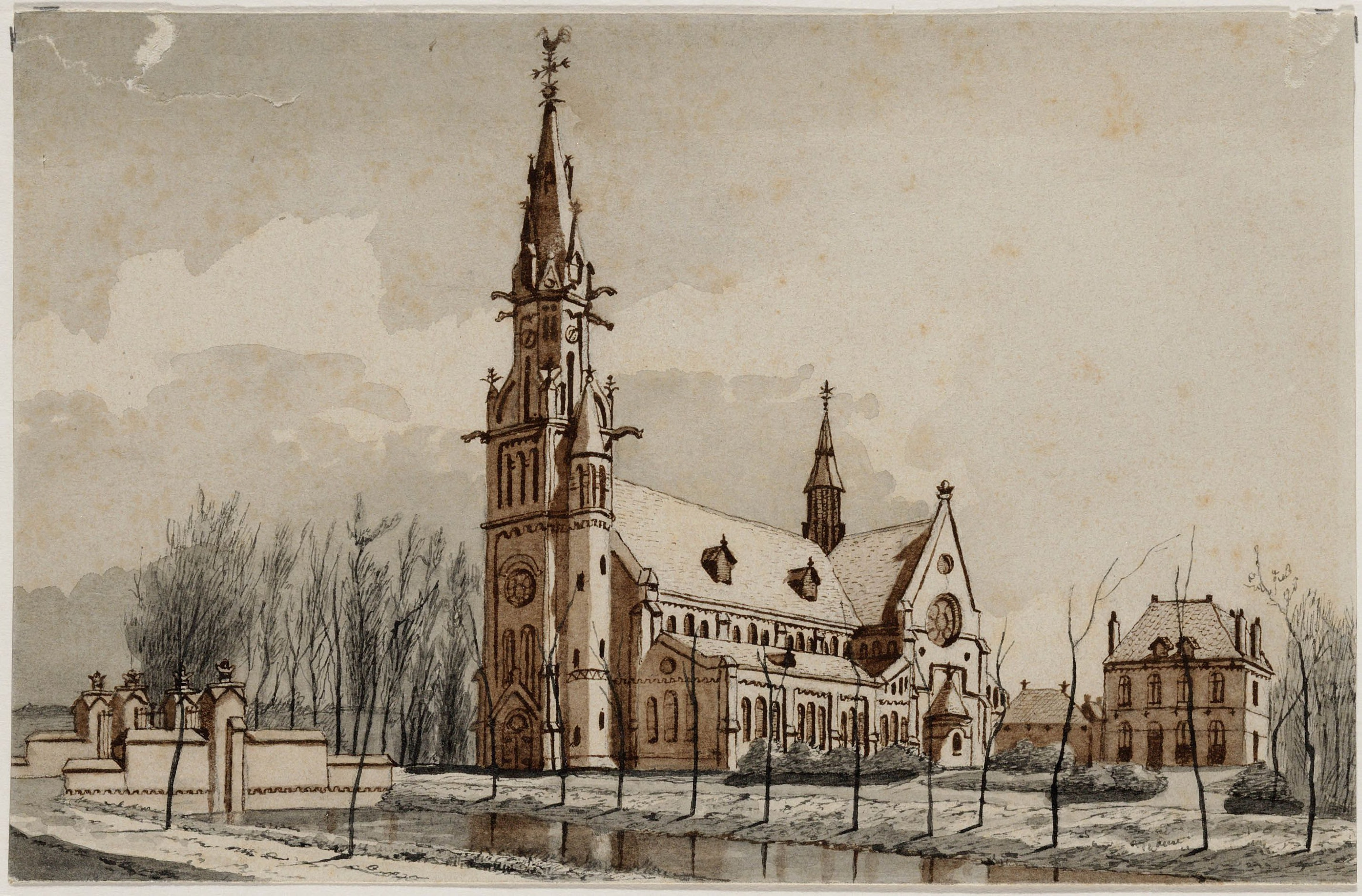
Sint-Dionysiuskerk, Heerhugowaard
