= Index of Amsterdam-related articles =

The following is an alphabetical list of articles related to Amsterdam. Amsterdam is the capital city of the Netherlands.

== 0–9 ==
- 1917 Potato riots
- 1928 Summer Olympics
- 1943 bombing of the Amsterdam civil registry office
- 1945 shooting on Dam square, Amsterdam
- 2014 Amsterdam drug deaths
- 2024 University of Amsterdam pro-Palestinian campus occupations
- 290 Square Meters

== A ==
- Academy of Theatre and Dance
- Admiralenbuurt
- Admiralty of Amsterdam
- AFC Ajax
- Agnietenklooster
- Albert Cuyp Market
- Allard Pierson Museum
- Allied bombings of Amsterdam-Noord
- All Saints' Flood (1170)
- Alteratie
- Amstel
- Amstel Brewery
- Amsteldorp
- Amstelhof
- Amstel Hotel
- Amstelland
- Amstelodamum
- Amstelpark
- Amstel River
- Amsterdam (1748)
- Amsterdam Airport Schiphol
- Amsterdam albatross
- Amsterdam Amstel station
- Amsterdam–Arnhem railway
- Amsterdam and Saint-Paul Islands temperate grasslands
- Amsterdam Baroque Orchestra & Choir
- Amsterdam Bijlmer ArenA station
- Amsterdam, California
- Amsterdam Centraal
- Amsterdam Centraal station
- Amsterdam-Centrum
- Amsterdam City Archives
- Amsterdam Dance Event
- Amsterdam Entrepôt
- Amsterdam Gay Pride
- Amsterdam Global Conference on Sustainability and Transparency
- Amsterdam–Haarlem–Rotterdam railway
- Amsterdam Holendrecht station
- Amsterdam Houses
- Amsterdam Island cattle
- Amsterdam Marathon
- Amsterdam Metro
- Amsterdam metropolitan area
- Amsterdam Museum
- Amsterdam Music Festival
- Amsterdam, Missouri
- Amsterdam, Montana
- Amsterdam, New York
- Amsterdam Nieuw-West
- Amsterdam-Noord
- Amsterdam, Ohio
- Amsterdam-Oost
- Amsterdam Oud-West
- Amsterdam Oud-Zuid
- Amsterdam–Rhine Canal
- Amsterdam, Saskatchewan
- Amsterdam–Schiphol railway
- Amsterdam School
- Amsterdam Science Park
- Amsterdam Stock Exchange
- Amsterdam, South Africa
- Amsterdam, Texas
- Amsterdam University College
- Amsterdam University of Applied Sciences
- Amsterdam University of the Arts
- Amsterdam-West
- Amsterdam Westerpark train collision
- Amsterdam Wooden Drydock I
- Amsterdam regional transport authority
- Amsterdammertje
- Amsterdamsche Droogdok Maatschappij
- Amsterdamsche Stoomboot Maatschappij
- Amsterdamse Bos
- Amsterdamse Poort (shopping centre)
- Amsterdam-Zuid
- Amsterdam-Zuidoost
- Amsterdam–Zutphen railway
- Amsterdam (town), New York
- Amsterdam RAI Exhibition and Convention Centre
- Anabaptist riot
- Anne Frank House
- Anne Frank tree
- Apollobuurt
- Art & Project
- Arti et Amicitiae
- Artis (zoo)
- Astoria (Amsterdam)
- Athenaeum Illustre of Amsterdam
- Atlas Maior

== B ==
- Bank of Amsterdam
- Bank of the Netherlands
- Banne Buiksloot
- Basilica of Saint Nicholas, Amsterdam
- Batavian Revolution in Amsterdam
- Beatrixpark
- Bed-in
- Beeldenstorm
- Begijnhof Chapel, Amsterdam
- Bell Beaker culture
- Betondorp
- Beurs van Berlage
- Bibliography of Amsterdam
- Bijbels Museum
- Bijlmer
- Bijlmermeer
- Binnenstad (Amsterdam)
- Bloemenmarkt
- Bombing of Amsterdam
- Boom Chicago
- Borneo-eiland
- Boroughs of Amsterdam
- Bos en Lommer
- Bubonic plague
- Buiksloot
- Buikslotermeer
- Buitenveldert
- Bullewijk
- Bungehuis and Maagdenhuis occupations
- Burgwallen Oude Zijde
- Burgwallen Nieuwe Zijde

== C ==
- Canals of Amsterdam
- Capital of the Netherlands
- Central Agency for Jewish Emigration in Amsterdam
- Chassébuurt
- City rights in the Low Countries
- Coat of arms of Amsterdam
- Coffeeshop (Netherlands)
- Concertgebouw, Amsterdam
- Conservatorium van Amsterdam
- Coster Diamonds
- Cruquiuseiland
- Cycling in Amsterdam
- Czaar Peterbuurt

== D ==
- Damrak
- Dam Square
- Dapperbuurt
- De Aker
- De Appel
- De Ateliers
- De Baarsjes
- De Bazel
- De Bijenkorf
- De Eendracht, Amsterdam
- De Hallen
- De Krijtberg
- De L'Europe Amsterdam
- De Pijp
- De Schreeuw
- De Telegraaf
- De Volkskrant
- De Wallen
- DeLaMar
- Den Helder–Amsterdam railway
- Diamantbuurt (Amsterdam)
- Diamond Museum Amsterdam
- Diemerpark
- Doelen Hotel
- Doelistenmovement
- Driemond
- Dubbeltjespanden
- Duivelseiland (Amsterdam)
- Durgerdam
- Dutch cuisine
- Dutch East India Company
- Dutch Golden Age
- Dutch National Holocaust Museum
- Dutch Republic
- Dutch West India Company

== E ==
- Eastern Docklands
- Egelantier
- Eighty Years' War
- El Al Flight 1862
- Elsevier
- English Reformed Church, Amsterdam
- Esprit Scholengroep
- Euronext Amsterdam
- European colonization of the Americas
- Expansion of Amsterdam since the 19th century
- EYE Film Institute Netherlands

== F ==
- February strike
- Felix Meritis
- First Dutch Academy
- Flag of Amsterdam
- Flevopark
- Floradorp
- Foam Fotografiemuseum Amsterdam
- Fort Amsterdam
- Fort Amsterdam (Curaçao)
- Fort Amsterdam, Ghana
- Frankendael
- Frederik Hendrikbuurt
- Frederik Hendrikplantsoen
- Fusilladeplaats Rozenoord

== G ==
- Gaasperdam
- Gerrit Rietveld Academie
- Geuzenveld
- Geuzenveld-Slotermeer
- Global city
- Government of Amsterdam
- Grachtengordel
- GVB (Amsterdam)

== H ==
- Haarlemmerbuurt (Amsterdam)
- Hamsterdam
- Haveneiland
- H'ART Museum
- He Hua Temple
- Heilige Stede
- Heineken brewery
- Heineken Experience
- Heineken Music Hall
- HEMA (store)
- Henk Sneevlietweg metro station
- Het Houten Stadion
- Het Parool
- Het Scheepvaartmuseum
- Het Schip
- Hilton Amsterdam
- History of Amsterdam
- History of urban centres in the Low Countries
- Hogeweyk
- Holendrecht
- Holland
- Holland Festival
- Holysloot
- Hoofddorppleinbuurt
- Horecava
- Hortus Botanicus (Amsterdam)
- Hotel Polen fire
- Houthaven
- Huguenots
- Huis Marseille, Museum for Photography

== I ==
- Ignatius Gymnasium
- IJ (Amsterdam)
- IJburg
- IJmeer
- IJtram
- Île Amsterdam
- Imagine Film Festival
- Indische Buurt
- International Colonial and Export Exhibition
- International Documentary Film Festival Amsterdam
- International Socialist Congress, Amsterdam 1904

== J ==
- Java-eiland
- Jodenbreestraat
- Jodenbuurt
- Johan Cruyff Arena
- Joods Historisch Museum
- Jordaan
- Jordaanlied
- Jordaanoproer

== K ==
- Kadijken (Amsterdam)
- Kadoelen
- Kalverstraat
- Kingdom of Holland
- Kinkerbuurt
- KLIK Amsterdam Animation Festival
- Kloveniersdoelen, Amsterdam
- KNSM Island
- Kolenkit District
- Koningsplein
- Koninklijke Nederlandse Stoomboot-Maatschappij
- Korenbeurs (Amsterdam)
- KunstRAI

== L ==
- Landelijk Noord
- Landlust
- La Rive
- Lastage
- Liberation Day (Netherlands)
- List of films set in Amsterdam
- List of mayors of Amsterdam
- List of museums in Amsterdam
- List of national capitals by latitude
- List of national capitals by population
- List of outdoor sculptures in the Netherlands
- List of parks in Amsterdam
- List of people from Amsterdam
- List of railway stations in Amsterdam
- List of restaurants in Amsterdam
- List of songs about Amsterdam
- List of squares in Amsterdam
- List of streets in Amsterdam
- List of tallest buildings in Amsterdam
- List of tourist attractions in Amsterdam
- Lucas Bols

== M ==
- Malaysia Airlines Flight 17
- Metz & Co
- Middelveldsche Akerpolder
- Miniature Museum
- Miracle of Amsterdam
- Mokum
- Molenwijk (Amsterdam)
- Montelbaanstoren
- Montessori Lyceum Amsterdam
- Mozes en Aäronkerk
- Muntplein (Amsterdam)
- Munttoren
- Museum Fodor
- Museum Geelvinck-Hinlopen
- Museum Jan van der Togt
- Museumkwartier
- Museum Van Loon
- Museum Willet-Holthuysen
- Music venues in the Netherlands

== N ==
- National Monument (Amsterdam)
- Negen Straatjes
- NEMO (museum)
- Nes (Amsterdam)
- Netherlands Film Academy
- Netherlands Film and Television Academy
- Netherlands in World War II
- Netherlands Media Art Institute
- Netherlands Trading Society
- New Amsterdam
- New Amsterdam, Guyana
- New Amsterdam, Indiana
- New Amsterdam's windmills
- Nieuw-Amsterdam, Netherlands
- Nieuwe Kerk, Amsterdam
- Nieuwe Pijp
- Nieuwendam
- Nieuwendammerdijk en Buiksloterdijk
- Nieuwmarkt
- Nieuw Sloten
- Noorderkerk
- Noordermarkt
- North Holland
- North Holland Canal
- North Sea Canal

== O ==
- Obrechtkerk
- Old Stadion (Amsterdam)
- Olympisch Kwartier
- Olympic Stadium (Amsterdam)
- Omval
- Oostelijke Eilanden
- Oosterdokseiland
- Oosterpark (Amsterdam)
- Oostoever
- Oostelijke Handelskade
- Oosterparkbuurt (Amsterdam)
- Oostpoort (Amsterdam)
- Oost-Indisch Huis
- Oost-Watergraafsmeer
- Oostzanerwerf
- Oranje-Nassau Kazerne
- OT301
- Oude Pijp
- Openbare Bibliotheek Amsterdam
- Osdorp
- Oud-Oost
- Oud Osdorp
- Oude Kerk, Amsterdam
- Overhoeks
- Overtoombuurt
- Overtoomse Veld

== P ==
- Pachtersoproer
- Paleis voor Volksvlijt
- Palingoproer
- Parkschouwburg (Amsterdam)
- Patriottentijd
- Plantage
- Plan Zuid
- Port of Amsterdam
- Portuguese Synagogue (Amsterdam)
- Postjesbuurt
- Prinsengracht
- Prinses Irenebuurt
- Prostitution in Europe
- Prostitution Information Center
- Prostitution in the Netherlands
- Provo (movement)

== Q ==
- Quellinusschool
- Querido Verlag

== R ==
- RAI Amsterdam Convention Centre
- Railroad strikes of 1903 in the Netherlands
- Randstad
- Ransdorp
- Rapenburg (Amsterdam)
- Rasphuis
- Rembrandt House Museum
- Rembrandtpark
- Rembrandtplein
- Rialto (theater)
- Rieteilanden
- Rijksakademie van beeldende kunsten
- Rijksmuseum
- Rivierenbuurt (Amsterdam)
- Rokin
- Roman Catholic Diocese of Haarlem–Amsterdam
- Royal Asscher Diamond Company
- Royal Concertgebouw Orchestra
- Royal Institute of Sciences, Literature and Fine Arts
- Royal Palace of Amsterdam
- Royal Theater Carré
- Royal Tropical Institute
- Ruigoord

== S ==
- SAIL Amsterdam
- Saint Paul and Amsterdam Islands
- Sandberg Institute
- Sarphatipark
- Schellingwoude
- Schinkelbuurt
- Schout
- Schouwburg of Van Campen
- Schreierstoren
- Second plague pandemic
- Singel
- Singelgracht
- Skinny Bridge
- Sloten, Amsterdam
- Sloterdijk, Amsterdam
- Slotermeer (tuinstad)
- Sloterpark
- Slotervaart (neighbourhood)
- SMART Project Space
- Society of Suriname
- Sovereign Principality of the United Netherlands
- Spaarndammerbuurt
- Sporenburg
- Spui (Amsterdam)
- Staatsliedenbuurt (Amsterdam)
- Stadionbuurt
- Stadsschouwburg
- Stadstekenacademie, Amsterdam
- Statue of Anne Frank (Westermarkt)
- Steigereiland
- STEIM
- Stelling van Amsterdam
- Stille Omgang
- Stoomvaart Maatschappij Nederland
- Stopera
- St. Peter's Flood
- Symfonisch Blaasorkest ATH

== T ==
- Teleport (Amsterdam)
- The Anatomy Lesson of Dr. Nicolaes Tulp
- Theater Amsterdam
- The Diary of a Young Girl
- The Night Watch
- Timeline of Amsterdam
- Trams in Amsterdam
- Transport in Amsterdam
- Transvaalbuurt (Amsterdam)
- Treaty of Amsterdam
- Trial of Geert Wilders
- Trippenhuis
- Trompbuurt
- Tuindorp Nieuwendam
- Tuindorp Oostzaan
- Tuschinski Theatre

== U ==
- Uilenburg (Amsterdam)
- Uitmarkt
- Underground media in the German-occupied Netherlands
- University of Amsterdam

== V ==
- Van Amstel family
- Van Gogh Museum
- Venserpolder
- Verzetsmuseum
- Victoria Hotel, Amsterdam
- Vliegenbos
- Vlooienburg
- Vondelpark
- Vondelparkbuurt
- Vrije Universiteit Amsterdam

== W ==
- Waag, Amsterdam
- Walls of Amsterdam
- Watergraafsmeer
- Waterwijk (Amsterdam)
- Weesp
- Weesperkarspel
- Weesperzijde (Amsterdam)
- Wertheimpark
- Westelijke Eilanden
- Westelijk Havengebied
- Westerkerk
- Westermoskee
- Westerpark (neighbourhood)
- Westerpark (park)
- Westpoort
- Weteringschans
- Willemspark (Amsterdam)
- Wolfger van Amstel
- World Trade Center (Amsterdam)

== Z ==
- Zeeburg
- Zeeburgereiland
- Zeeheldenbuurt
- Zuidas
- Zuideramstel
- Zuiderkerk
- Zunderdorp
- Zuiderzee Works
- Zuyderzée

== See also ==
- List of cities in the Netherlands by province
- List of populated places in the Netherlands
