= Timeline of Amsterdam =

Coordinates: 52.373056°N 4.892222°E

The following is a timeline of the history of the municipality of Amsterdam, Netherlands.

== Prior to 17th century ==
- 2700~2750 BC – age of Neolithic shards of Bell Beaker culture pottery found under Rokin
- 2200~2000 BC – age of granite grinding stone found under Damrak
- 10th c. – Farmers settling at upstream Amstel
- 1105 – Wolfger van Amstel mentioned in a document as scultetus of "Amestelle" (Amstelland).
- 1170 – All Saint's Flood made settlement possible at the banks of downstream Amstel
- 1213 – Founding Oude Kerk in this settlement
- 1270 – Dam built in Amstel River (approximate date).
- 1275
  - "Amestelledamme" (meaning: 'dam in the Amstel') appears for the first time in a charter.
  - 27 October, Count Floris V of the County of Holland granted traders, sailors and fishermen exemption from tolls.
- 1300 – Population: 1000.
- 1303 – Siege of Amsterdam
- 1306 – Amsterdam granted city rights. Oude Kerk consecrated.
- 1345 – 15 March: Alleged "Miracle of Amsterdam" occurs.
- 1347 – Heilige Stede chapel built.
- 1389 – The city was first called Aemsterdam in an authentic piece.
- 1408 – Nieuwe Kerk (church) construction begins.
- 1421 – Fire.
- 1425 – Singel canal dug.
- 1452 – Fire.
- 1470 – Agnietenklooster built.
- 1487 – Schreierstoren built.
- 1490s – Brick city wall built.
- 1516 – Montelbaanstoren built.
- 1518 – Egelantier formed (approximate date).
- 1535 – 10 May: Anabaptist riot occurs; "fanatics ran about the streets naked."
- 1566 – Beeldenstorm.
- 1568 – Amsterdam supports Catholics in the Dutch Revolt.
- 1575 – Erven Lucas Bols in business.
- 1578
  - Alteratie shifts power from Catholics to Protestants.
  - Prinsenhof (Amsterdam) built.
- 1585 – City expands beyond the Singel.
- 1586 – Admiralty of Amsterdam formed.
- 1596 – Rasphuis (prison) established.

== 17th century ==
- 1600 – Population: 50,000.
- 1601 – Goldsmith's guild established.
- 1602 – Amsterdam Stock Exchange and Dutch East India Company founded.
- 1603 – Hendrick de Keyser becomes city architect.
- 1606Oost-Indisch Huis built.
- 1607 – English Reformed Church established.
- 1609 – Bank of Amsterdam established.
- 1611 – Koopmansbeurs built.
- 1613 – Grachtengordel development begins.
- 1614 – Nieuwmarkt created.
- 1617
  - First Dutch Academy formed.
  - Korenbeurs built.
  - Town gate remodeled as Weigh House.
- 1619 – Westerhal built.
- 1620
  - Munttoren and Korenmetershuisje (Amsterdam) built.
  - English-language Corrant out of Italy, German, Etc. newspaper begins publication.
- 1621 – Dutch West India Company founded.
- 1622 – Cromhouthuizen built.
- 1631 – Artist Rembrandt moves to Jodenbreestraat in Amsterdam.
- 1632 – Athenaeum Illustre formed.
- 1633 – Oude Lutherse Kerk built.
- 1637 – Schouwburg of Van Campen (theatre) built.
- 1638
  - Hortus Medicus founded.
  - Accijnshuis built.
- 1641 – Saaihal (Amsterdam) built on Staalstraat (Amsterdam).
- 1642 – Rembrandt's artwork The Night Watch shown in the Kloveniersdoelen.
- 1651 – St. Peter's Flood.
- 1652 – 7 July: City Hall burns down.
- 1655 – New City Hall built on Dam Square.
- 1662
  - Trippenhuis and Weesperpoort (gate) built.
  - Blaeu's Atlas Maior published.
- 1663 – Bubonic plague outbreak.
- 1665 – New theatre opens.
- 1666 – Population: 200,000.
- 1672 – Johannes Hudde becomes mayor.
- 1675 – Portuguese Synagogue built.
- 1679 – Wynand-Fockink in business.
- 1682 – Begijnhof Chapel and Amstelhof built.
- 1683 – Society of Suriname established.
- 1691 – Skinny Bridge built.
- 1696 – Aansprekersoproer riots

== 18th century ==
- 1748
  - Pachtersoproer riots
  - Demands from Doelistenmovement
- 1765 – Stadstekenacademie founded.
- 1774 – Theatre opens on the Leidseplein.
- 1776 – Felix Meritis society and Society for the Advancement of Agriculture established.
- 1780 – Maagdenhuis built.
- 1785 – Seamen's Institute, and Society for Public Welfare organized.
- 1787 – Prussians in power.
- 1794
  - Metz & Co established.
  - Population: 217,024.
- 1795 – January: French in power.
- 1800 – Barrack of St. Charles built.

== 19th century ==
- 1808
  - Amsterdam becomes capital of Kingdom of Holland, client state of the French Empire.
  - City Hall becomes the Royal Palace.
  - Royal Institute of Sciences, Literature and Fine Arts founded.
- 1813 – Oranje-Nassau Kazerne (military barrack) built.
- 1814
  - Amsterdam becomes capital of the Netherlands.
  - Rijks-Museum relocates to the Trippenhuis building.
  - Bank of the Netherlands headquartered in city.
- 1815
  - Doelen Hotel in business.
  - Population: 180,179.
- 1824 – Netherlands Trading Society headquartered in city.
- 1825
  - North Holland Canal constructed.
  - Amsterdamsche Stoomboot Maatschappij established
- 1838 – Zoo opens.
- 1839
  - Amsterdam–Haarlem railway begins operating.
  - Station d'Eenhonderd Roe opens.
  - Arti et Amicitiae society organized.
- 1840
  - Coster Diamonds founded.
  - Willemspoort (gate) built.
- 1841 – Mozes en Aäronkerk (church) rebuilt.
- 1843 – Station Amsterdam Weesperpoort opens.
- 1845 – Zocher Stock Exchange built.
- 1852 – Bijbels Museum founded.
- 1853 – City "water supply" begins.
- 1854 – Royal Asscher Diamond Company founded.
- 1855 – Arti et Amicitiae constructed.
- 1856
  - Amsterdam–Arnhem railway constructed.
  - De Eendracht war memorial erected.
  - Koninklijke Nederlandse Stoomboot-Maatschappij (shipping company) established.
- 1862 – Bloemenmarkt founded.
- 1863 – Museum Fodor opens.
- 1864 – Crystal Palace built on the Frederiksplein (Amsterdam).
- 1866 – Population: 264,498.
- 1867
  - Heineken brewery built.
  - Amstel Hotel opens.
- 1869 – Netherlands Bank building constructed.
- 1870
  - Rijksakademie, De Bijenkorf shop, and Amstel Brewery founded.
  - Stoomvaart Maatschappij Nederland (steamship line) in business.
- 1872 – Construction of the first social housing project, de Dubbeltjespanden
- 1874
  - Amsterdam–Zutphen railway constructed.
  - Amsterdamse Toneelschool established.
- 1875 – Amsterdamsche Vereeniging tot het bouwen van Arbeiderswoningen housing association formed.
- 1876
  - North Sea Canal opens.
  - Population: 281,944.
- 1877 – Municipal University of Amsterdam and Teekenschool voor Kunstambachten founded.
- 1878 – Den Helder–Amsterdam railway begins operating.
- 1880 – Vrije Universiteit established.
- 1881
  - Telephone in operation.
  - AVA-woonblok D,E,F,G housing built in Czaar Peterbuurt.
  - Stille Omgang revived.
- 1882 – Spui square created.
- 1883
  - May: International Colonial and Export Exhibition opens.
  - Parkschouwburg (Amsterdam) (theatre) built.
  - Prins Hendrikplantsoen (park) laid out.
- 1884
  - Amsterdamsch Conservatorium founded.
  - Population: 361,326.
- 1885 – Rijksmuseum opens.
- 1886 – July: Palingoproer eel riot occurs.
- 1887
  - Orange riots..
  - Elsevier publisher in business.
  - Basilica of St. Nicholas built.
- 1888 – Concertgebouw built, and Royal Concertgebouw Orchestra founded.
- 1889 – Amsterdam Centraal railway station opens.
- 1890 – Victoria Hotel, Amsterdam in business.
- 1893 – Economic unrest.
- 1894 – Stadsschouwburg rebuilt.
- 1895
  - Wereldtentoonstelling voor het Hotel- en Reiswezen (exhibit) held.
  - Museum Willet-Holthuysen and Catholic Ignatius Gymnasium (school) established.
- 1896 – Hotel de l'Europe in business on the Nieuwe Doelenstraat (Amsterdam).
- 1900
  - Gemeentetram Amsterdam tramway established.
  - Amstelodamum historical society and AFC Ajax football club formed.
  - Population: 523,557.

== 20th century ==
=== 1900-1939 ===
- 1903
  - Railroad Strike.
  - Beurs van Berlage built.
- 1904
  - Hulp voor Onbehuisden (HvO, shelters for homeless people) founded.
  - August: International Socialist Congress held.
- 1906 – Amsterdam Wind Orchestra ATH formed.
- 1907 – Nöggerath cinema and Het Houten Stadion (stadium) open.
- 1911 – Rembrandt House Museum opens.
- 1914 – Harry Elte Stadium and De Groote Club on Kalverstraat built.
- 1915
  - De Bijenkorf (Amsterdam) department store built.
  - Querido Verlag (publisher) in business.
- 1917
  - 1917 Potato riots.
  - Amsterdam-Zuid development begins per Plan Zuid.
- 1919
  - Public library opens.
  - Het Schip apartment building erected.
  - Disteldorp and Vogeldorp areas built in Amsterdam-Noord.
  - Population: 647,120.
- 1920
  - Construction of the Defence Line of Amsterdam completed.
  - Muzieklyceum and Rialto cinema established.
- 1921
  - Buiksloot, Nieuwendam, Ransdorp, Sloten, and Watergraafsmeer annexed.
  - Tuschinski cinema built.
- 1923 – Tuindorp Oostzaan area built.
- 1924.
  - Institute of Applied Art formed.
  - National Vocational School for Pastry Chefs opens.
- 1925 – Tooneelmuseum (stage museum) founded.
- 1926
  - Amsterdam Museum established.
  - Royal Tropical Institute building constructed
  - HEMA (store) in business on Kalverstraat.
- 1927 – American Women's Club Amsterdam founded.
- 1928 – Summer Olympics held.
- 1929 – Palace of National Industry burns down.
- 1932 – Joods Historisch Museum opens.
- 1933 – Alhambra Theater opens.
- 1934
  - July: Jordaanoproer.
  - Allard Pierson Museum opens.
- 1935
  - International Institute for Social History established.
  - City Theater (Amsterdam) cinema opens.
- 1936 – Cineac Theatre built.
- 1939
  - Amsterdam Amstel railway station opens.
  - Apollo House (Amsterdam) built.

=== World War II ===
- 1940
  - 11 May: Bombing of Amsterdam by the Luftwaffe
  - German occupation begins
  - Het Parool newspaper begins publication.
- 1941
  - February strike.
  - Central Office for Jewish Emigration in the Netherlands begins operating.
- 1943
  - 27 March: 1943 bombing of the Amsterdam civil registry office
  - July: Allied bombings of Amsterdam-Noord.
- 1944 – 4 August: Frank family arrested.
- 1945
  People celebrating the liberation of the Netherlands at the end of World War II on 8 May 1945.
  - 18 January: Executions on the Fusilladeplaats Rozenoord begin.
  - 5 May: German occupation ends.
  - 7 May: Shooting on Dam square, Amsterdam.
  - 8 May: Canadian troops enter city
  - 9 May: Mass celebrations in Dam Square
  - Filmtheater Kriterion opens.
  - De Volkskrant newspaper in publication.
- 1946 – Dutch Historic Film Archive founded.
- 1947
  - The Diary of a Young Girl by Anne Frank is published.
  - Holland Festival begins.

=== 1950s-1990s ===
- 1952
  - May: Amsterdam–Rhine Canal opens.
  - DOK (discothèque) active.
  - Filmmuseum founded.
- 1956 – National Monument erected in Dam Square.
- 1957 – Horecava hospitality trade fair begins.
- 1958 – Netherlands Film and Television Academy founded.
- 1959 – Population: 872,000.
- 1960
  - Anne Frank House museum established on the Prinsengracht.
  - Academie voor Kleinkunst (school) founded.
  - Uitzendbureau Amstelveen (now Randstad NV) was founded.
- 1961 – Amsterdam RAI Exhibition and Convention Centre opens.
- 1962 – Hilton Hotel in business.
- 1965 – Counterculture Provo (movement) begins.
- 1966
  - 13–14 June: Telegraafrellen (labor unrest) occurs.
  - Weesperkarspel annexed.
- 1967 – Catholic Theological University of Amsterdam established.
- 1968
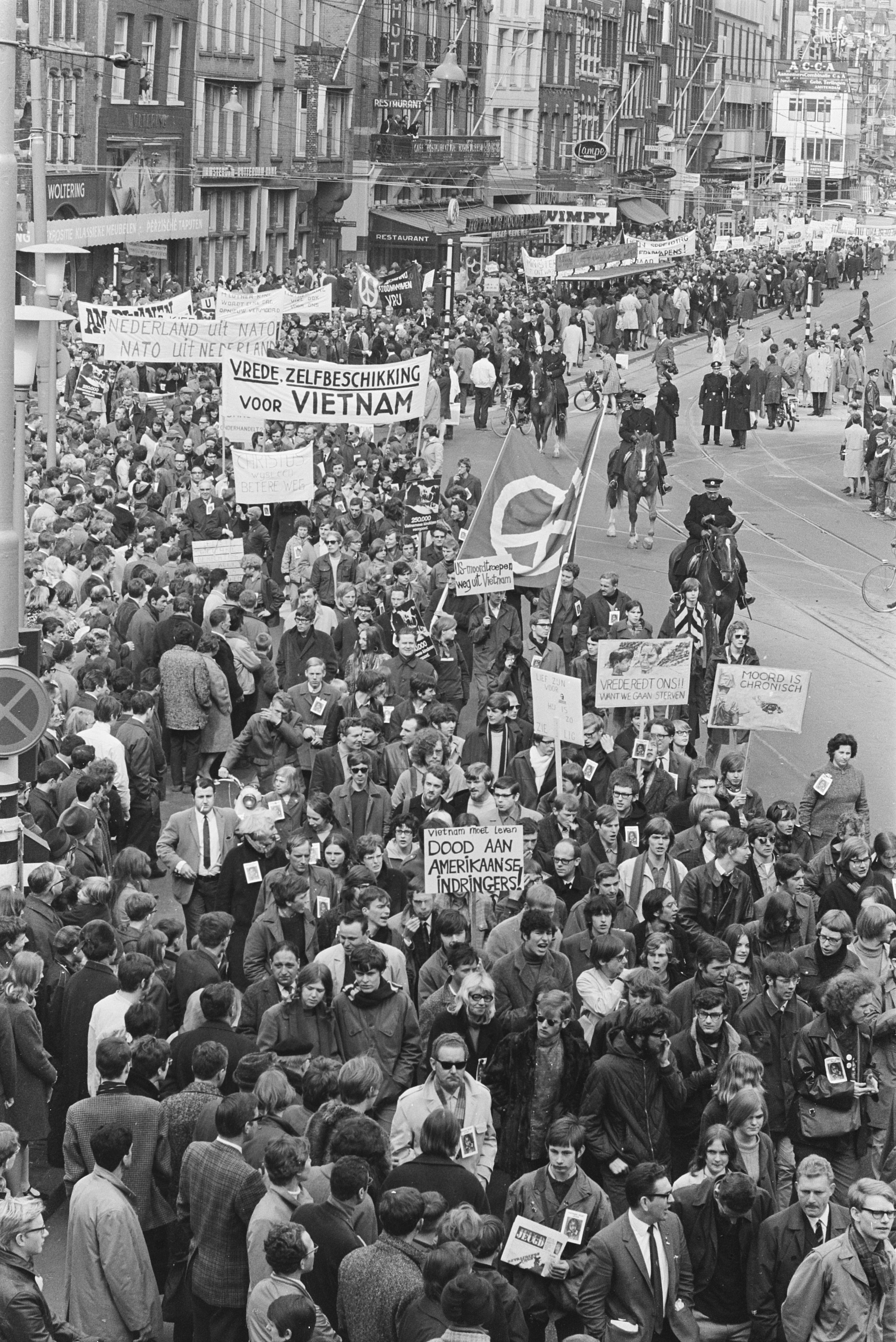
  Protest against the Vietnam War in Amsterdam, April 1968
  - Art & Project gallery opens.
  - Theaterschool founded.
- 1969
  - March: Bed-In for Peace held.
  - May: Student protest occurs at the University of Amsterdam Maagdenhuis.
  - STEIM cultural venue established.
  - RIBW Querido founded by prof. dr. Querido, the first psychiatrist to visit patients at home
- 1970
  - Population: 807,095.
  - Eurovision Song Contest 1970 held.
- 1971 – Amsterdam Bijlmer ArenA railway station opens.
- 1972 – In-Out Centre opens.
- 1973 – Van Gogh Museum opens.
- 1975
  - Flag of Amsterdam design adopted.
  - Rainbow Foundation, De Appel art centre, and Other Books and So founded.
  - Amsterdam Marathon and SAIL Amsterdam begin.
- 1976 – Sweelinck Conservatorium formed.
- 1977
  - 9 May: Hotel Polen fire.
  - Amsterdam Metro begins operating.
  - Uitmarkt begins
- 1978 – MonteVideo founded.
- 1979
  - Amsterdam Baroque Orchestra founded.
  - Huis van Bewaring I (Weteringschans) (prison) closed.
- 1981 – 21 November: Protest against stationing of NATO missiles.
- 1984
  - Social unrest.
  - Amsterdam Fantastic Film Festival begins.
- 1985 – Annual contemporary art fair begins.
- 1986
  - Amsterdam–Schiphol railway begins operating.
  - Stopera opera hall opens.
- 1987 – Amsterdamse Poort (shopping centre) opens.
- 1988
  - International Documentary Film Festival Amsterdam begins.
  - Stopera city hall opens.
- 1990 – Population: 695,221.
- 1991
  - Museum Geelvinck-Hinlopen established.
  - Museum Jan van der Togt opens.
- 1992
  - 4 October: Airplane crash in Bijlmermeer.
  - Miniature Museum founded.
- 1993 – La Rive and Boom Chicago founded.
- 1994
  - Conservatorium van Amsterdam and Prostitution Information Center founded.
  - SMART Project Space opens.
- 1996
  - Amsterdam Gay Pride begins.
  - Amsterdam Arena built.
- 1997
  - 2 October: EU treaty signed in city.
  - Henk Sneevlietweg metro station opens.
  - IJburg residential archipelago construction begins.
- 1999 – OT301 squat begins.
- 2000
  - Prostitution in the Netherlands legalized.
  - Euronext founded.
  - HvO and RIBW Querido merge to form HVO-Querido, an organisation that helps homeless people

== 21st century ==
- 2001
  - 1 April: First legalized same-sex marriage in the Netherlands occurs.
  - Foam Fotografiemuseum Amsterdam and Heineken Music Hall open.
  - Job Cohen becomes mayor.
  - 290 Square Meters opens its first shop
- 2004 – 2 November: Filmmaker Van Gogh killed on Linnaeusstraat.
- 2006 – Amsterdam Film eXperience begins.
- 2007
  - KLIK! Amsterdam Animation Festival begins.
  - Diamond Museum Amsterdam opens.
  - Centrale Bibliotheek moves into new building.
  - Amsterdam City Archives relocates to De Bazel building.
  - De Schreeuw memorial erected in the Oosterpark.
- 2008 – Amsterdam Holendrecht railway station opens.
- 2009 – H'ART Museum opens.
- 2010 – Eberhard van der Laan becomes mayor.
- 2011 – February: Retrial of Geert Wilders begins in the Rechtbank Amsterdam (court).
- 2012
  - 21 April: Sloterdijk train collision.
  - EYE Film Institute Netherlands opens.
  - Junior Eurovision Song Contest 2012 held.
- 2013 – Population: 800.000 in January 2013.
- 2014
  - 17 July: Malaysia Airlines Flight 17 departs from Amsterdam, later crashes in Ukraine.
  - 2014 Amsterdam drug deaths occur.
- 2015
  - February: University of Amsterdam Bungehuis and Maagdenhuis occupations (student protest) occur.
  - Regeneration of Frederik Hendrikplantsoen
- 2018
  - Femke Halsema becomes mayor.
  - 2018 Amsterdam stabbing attack
- 2019
  - December: The start of Stichting Nederlied for special dutch language theatre
- 2022
  - The municipality Weesp merged with Amsterdam on 24 March 2022.
  - Population: 903.000 in March 2022.
- 2024
  - March. Opening of the Dutch National Holocaust Museum
  - 2024 University of Amsterdam pro-Palestinian campus occupations
  - November 2024 Amsterdam riots
- 2025
  - March 2025 Amsterdam stabbing attack
  - August Killing of Lisa from Abcoude

== Images ==
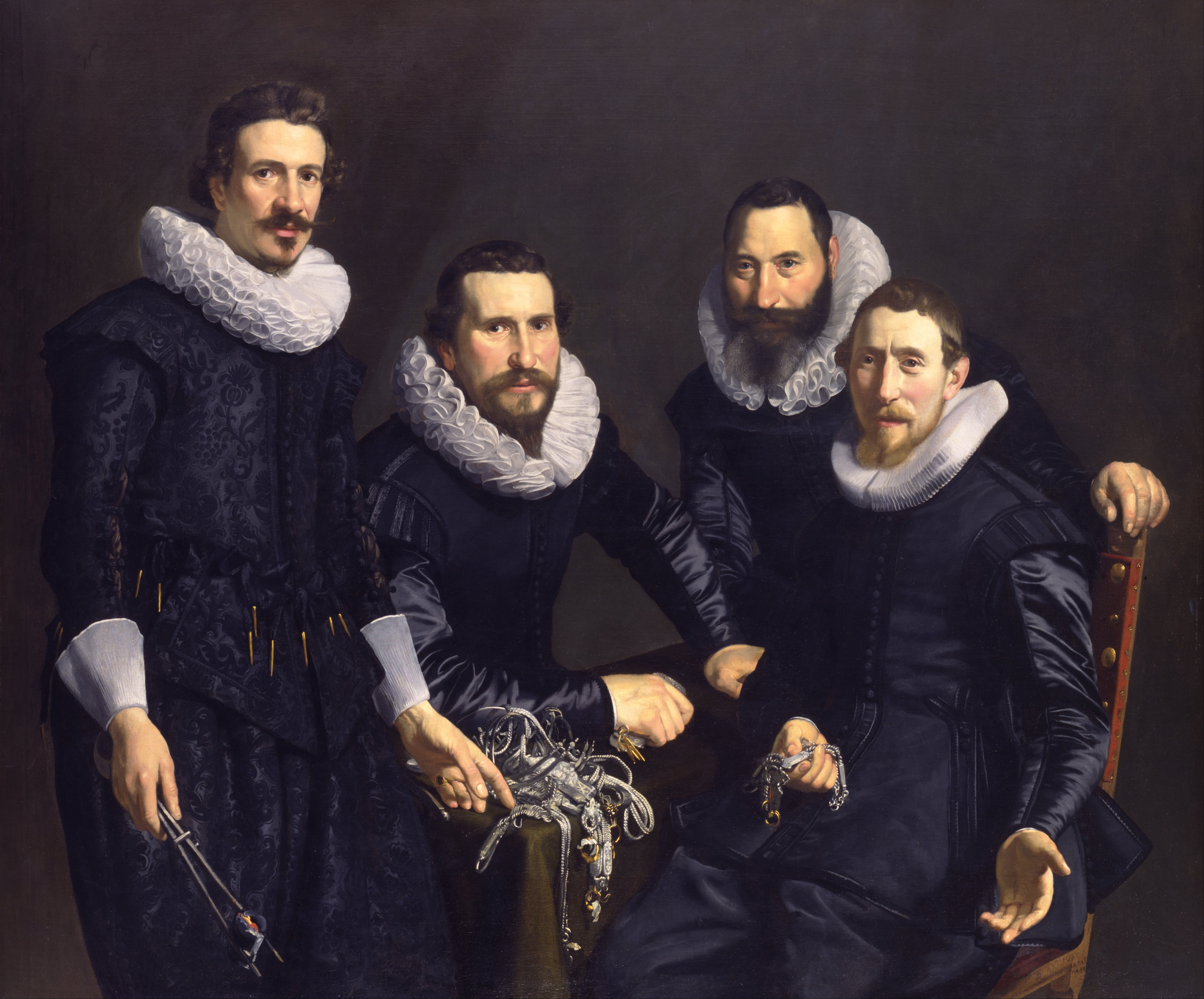
Portrait of the syndics of the Amsterdam Goldsmiths Guild, established in 1601 (painting from 1627)

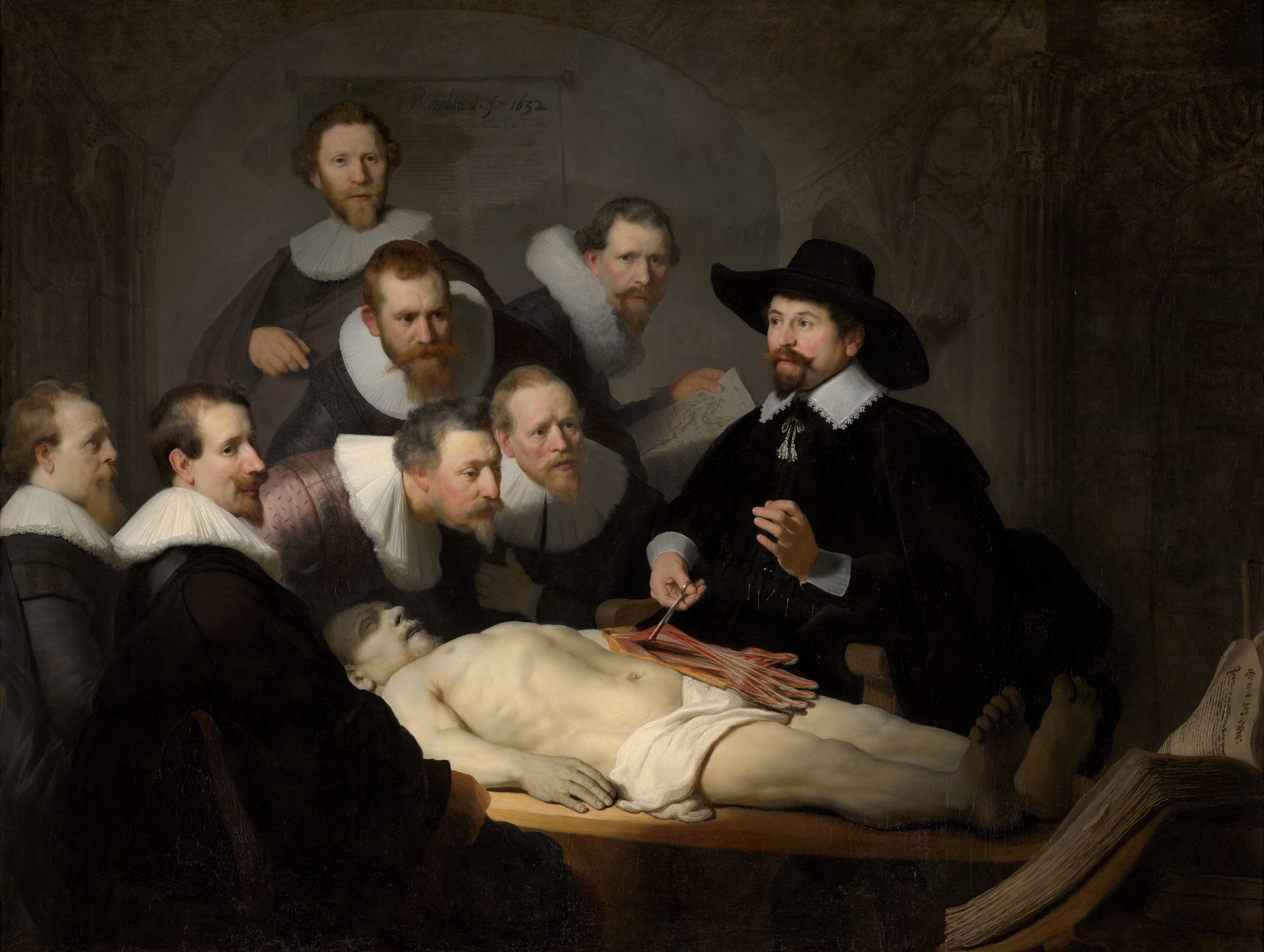
Amsterdam Guild of Surgeons anatomy lesson on 31 January 1632

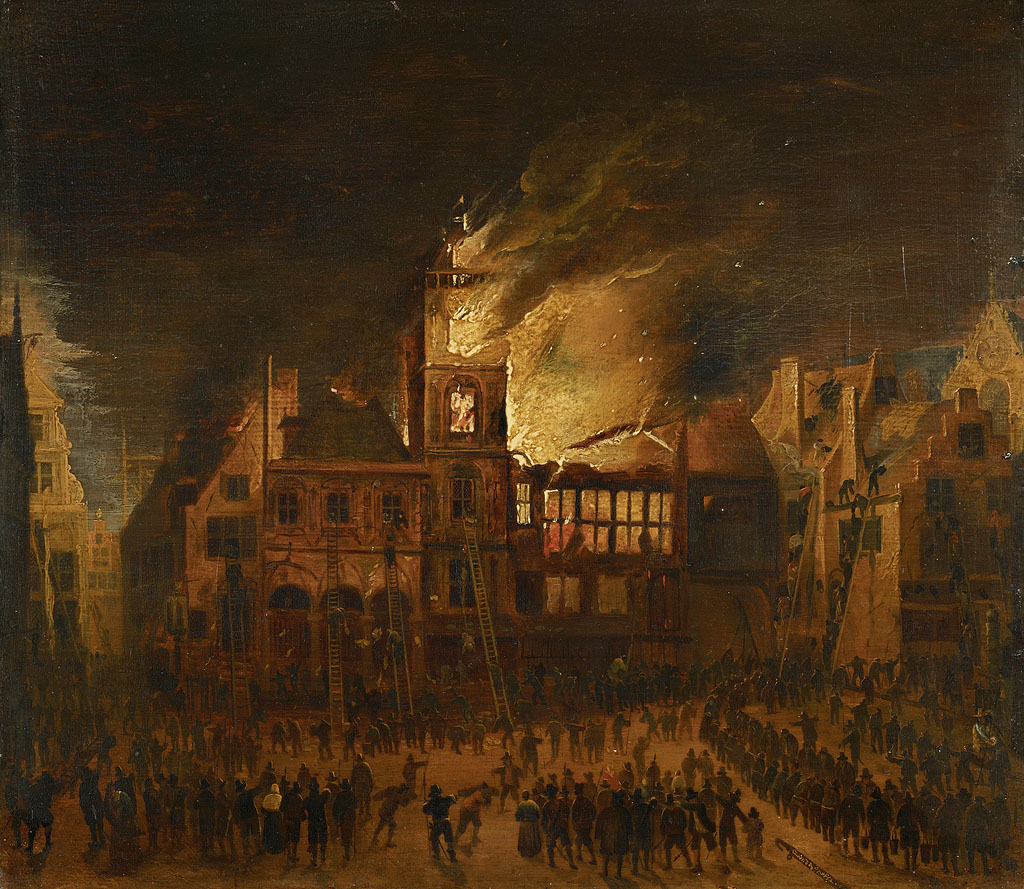
Stadhuis on fire, 7 July 1652

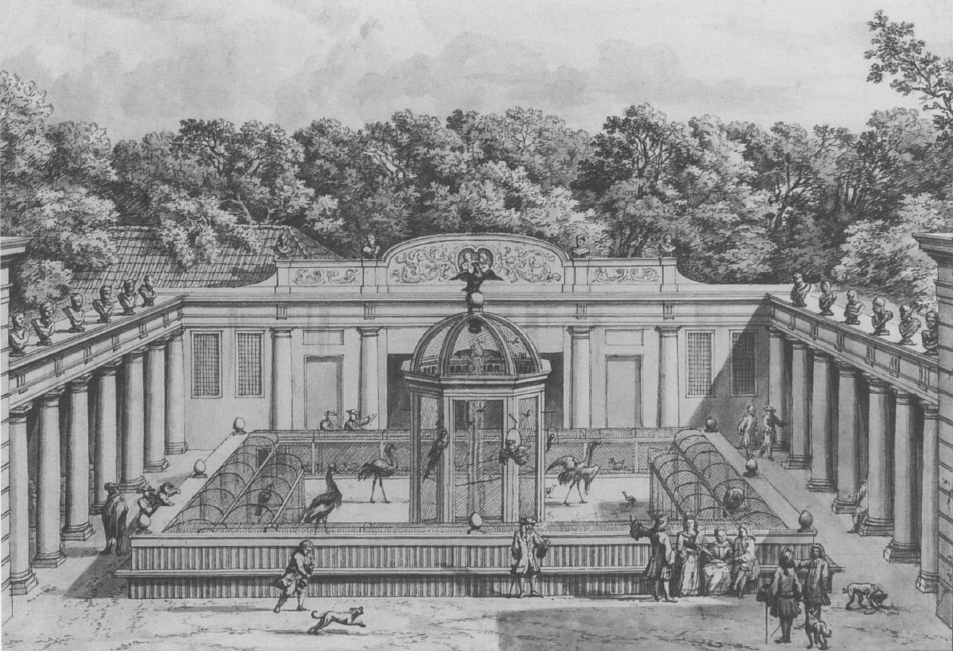
Aviary, Blauw Jan Inn, Amsterdam, ca.1700

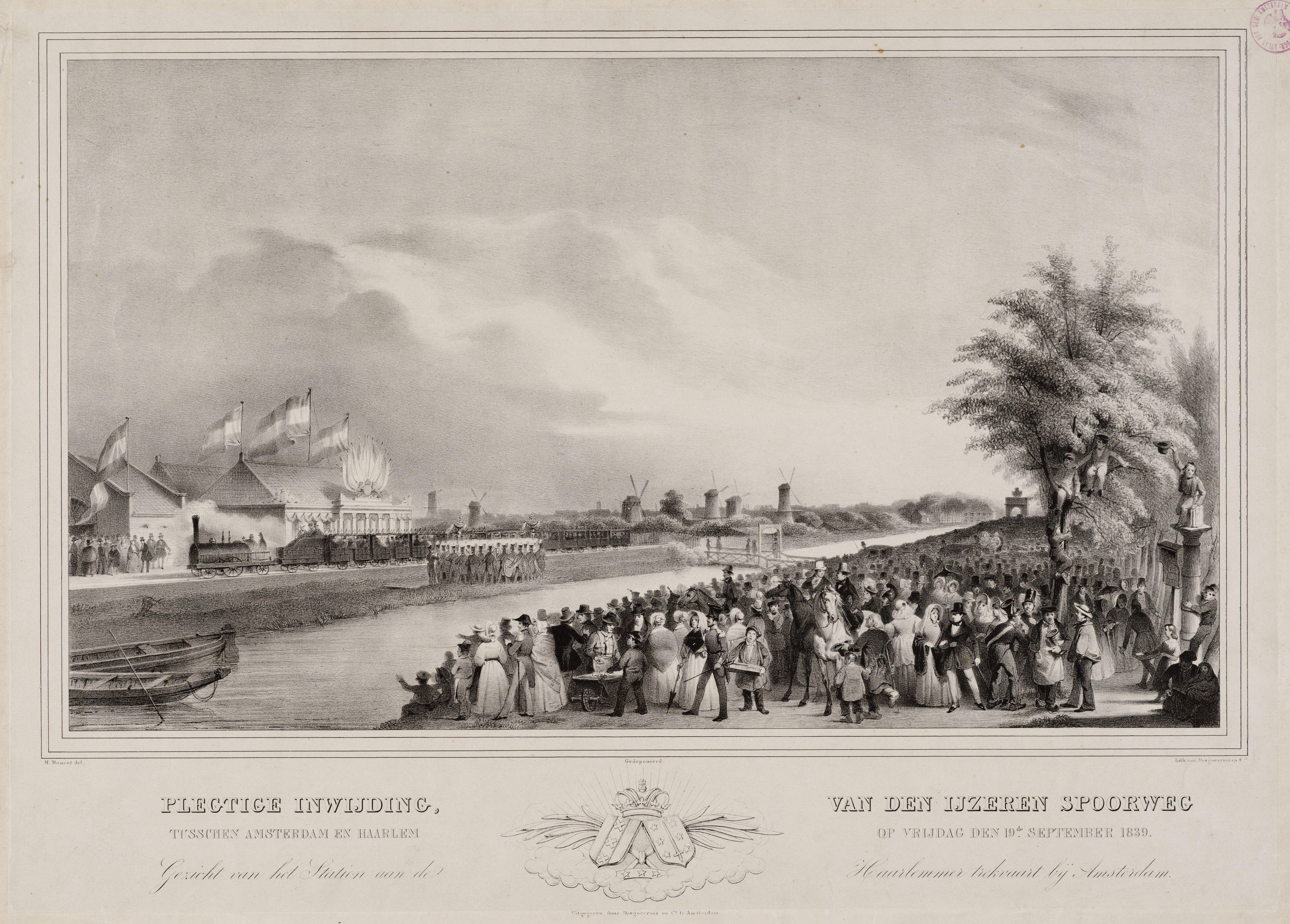
Train begins operating, 1839

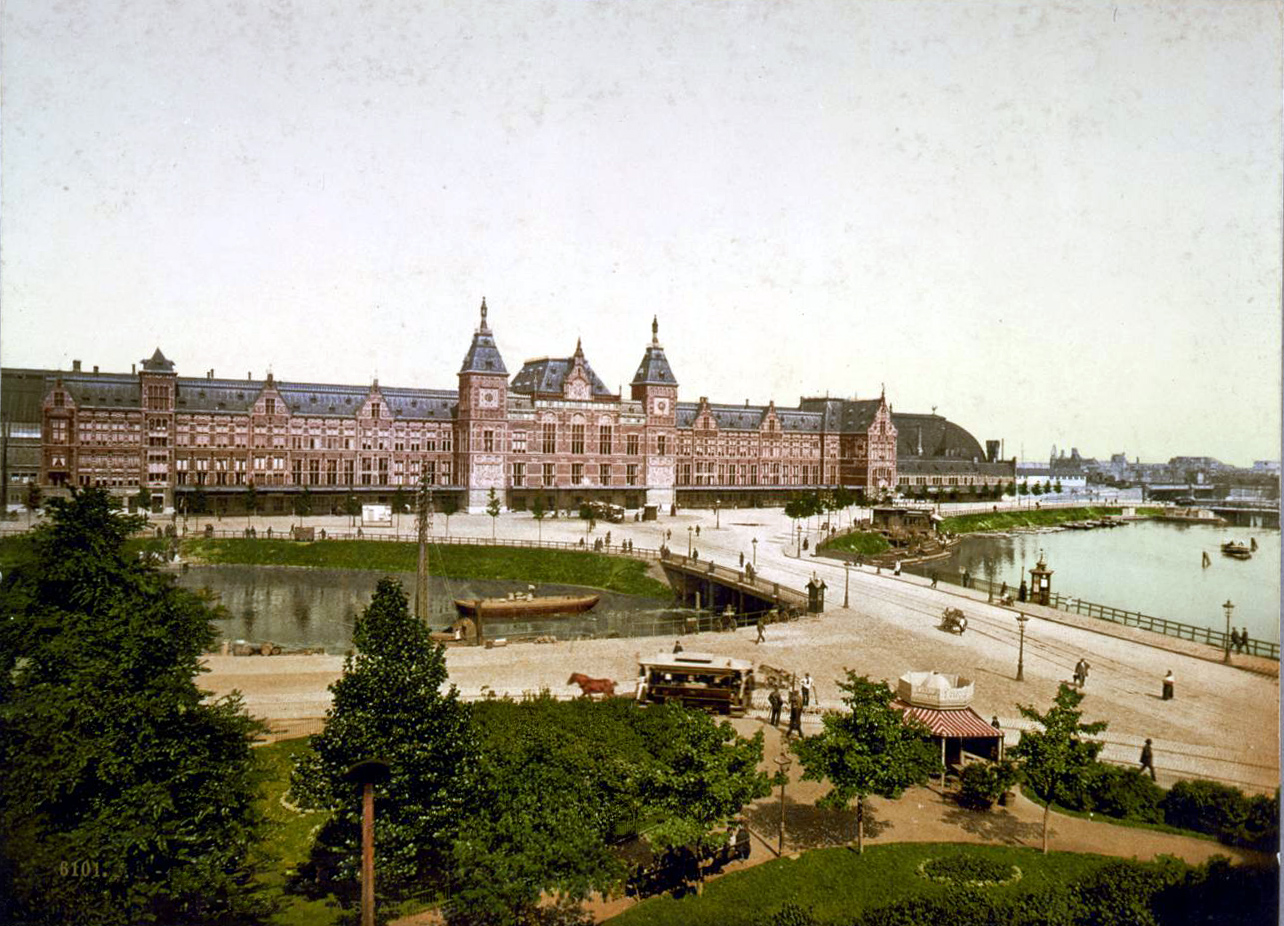
Centraal Station, Amsterdam, ca.1890s

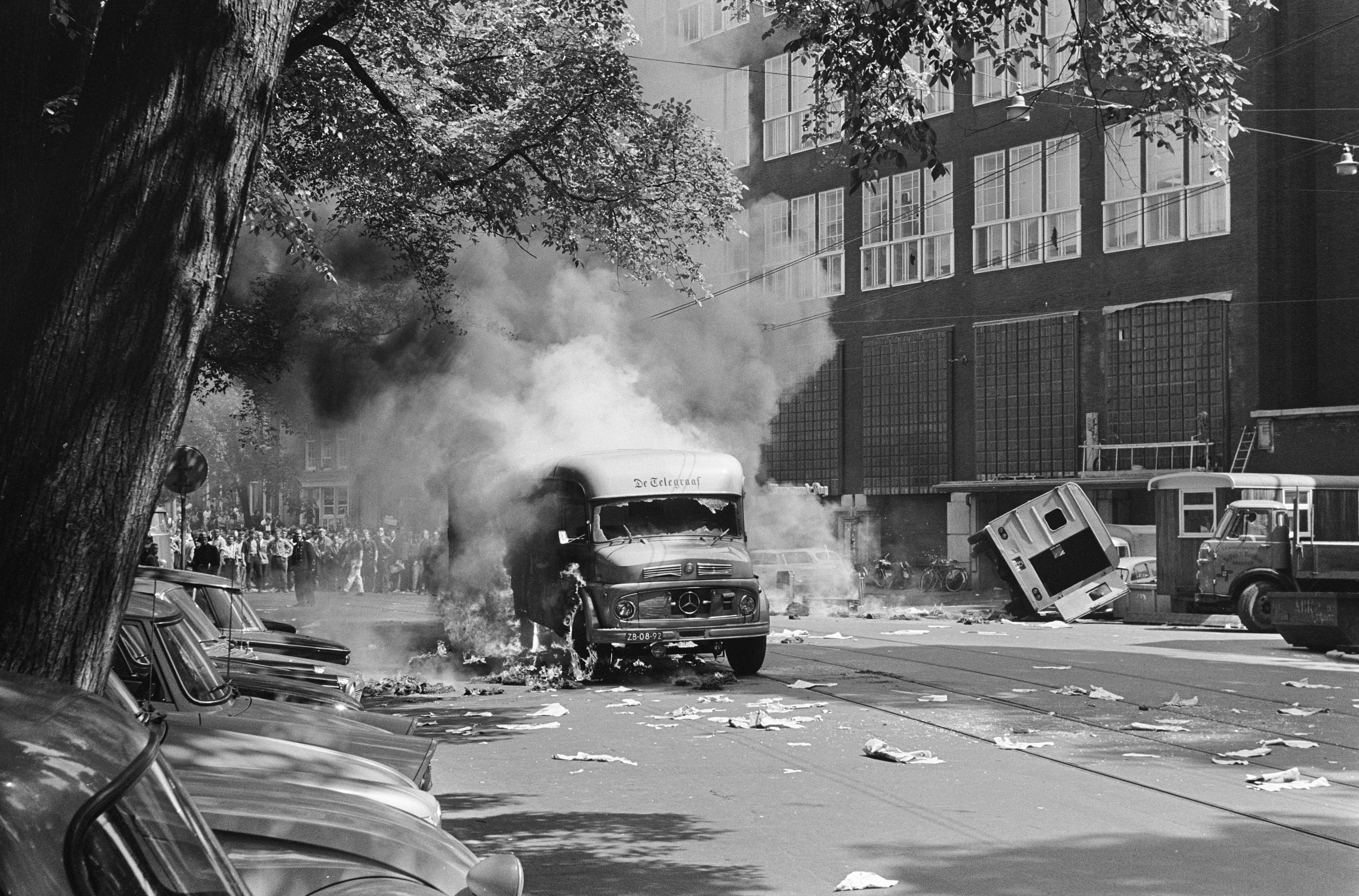
Labor unrest, 1966

== See also ==
- History of Amsterdam
- List of mayors of Amsterdam
- List of rijksmonuments in Amsterdam
- Walls of Amsterdam
- Expansion of Amsterdam since the 19th century
- List of streets in Amsterdam
- Timelines of other municipalities in the Netherlands: Breda, Delft, Eindhoven, Groningen, Haarlem, The Hague, 's-Hertogenbosch, Leiden, Maastricht, Nijmegen, Rotterdam, Utrecht
- History of urban centers in the Low Countries

== Bibliography ==
- Francis Coghlan (1863), "Amsterdam", Coghlan's Illustrated Guide to the Rhine (18th ed.), London: Trubner & Co.
- William Henry Overall, ed. (1870). "Amsterdam". Dictionary of Chronology. London: William Tegg. hdl:2027/uc2.ark:/13960/t9m32q949.
- "Amsterdam", Handbook for travellers in Holland and Belgium (19th ed.), London: John Murray, 1876, OCLC 221452961
- John Ramsay McCulloch (1880), "Amsterdam", in Hugh G. Reid (ed.), A Dictionary, Practical, Theoretical and Historical of Commerce and Commercial Navigation, London: Longmans, Green, and Co.
- "Amsterdam", Belgium and Holland (3rd ed.), Leipsic: Karl Baedeker, 1891, OCLC 5624932
- "Amsterdam". Chambers's Encyclopaedia. London. 1901. hdl:2027/uc2.ark:/13960/t5bc48059.
- "Amsterdam (Holland)" . Encyclopædia Britannica. Vol. 1 (11th ed.). 1910. pp. 896–898.
- Benjamin Vincent (1910), "Amsterdam", Haydn's Dictionary of Dates (25th ed.), London: Ward, Lock & Co., hdl:2027/uc2.ark:/13960/t41r6xh8t
- W. Dougill (May 1931). "Amsterdam: Its Town Planning Development". Town Planning Review. 14 (3): 194. doi:10.3828/tpr.14.3.e7305921l6228626.
- Marietta Haffner; Marja Elsinga (2009). "Deadlocks and breakthroughs in urban renewal: a network analysis in Amsterdam". Journal of Housing and the Built Environment. 24 (2): 147–165. doi:10.1007/s10901-009-9137-1. JSTOR 41107458.
- Christine Delhaye (2010), "Towards Cultural Diversity in Amsterdam's Arts", in Liza Nell; Jan Rath (eds.), Ethnic Amsterdam: immigrants and urban change in the twentieth century, Amsterdam: Amsterdam University Press, ISBN 9789089641687
- Guides, Rough (2015). "Chronology". Pocket Rough Guide Amsterdam (3rd ed.). Penguin. ISBN 978-0-241-21445-9.
