= Bibliography of Amsterdam =

The following is a list of works about Amsterdam, Netherlands.

== List of works, arranged by author ==
- Cotterell, Geoffrey. Amsterdam: The Life of a City (1972)
- de Waard, M., ed. Imagining Global Amsterdam: History, Culture, and Geography in a World City. Amsterdam: Amsterdam University Press 2013.ISBN 9789089643674
- Feddes, Fred. A Millennium of Amsterdam: Spatial History of a Marvelous City. Bussum: Thoth 2012. ISBN 978-9068685954
- Lindemann, Mary. The Merchant Republics: Amsterdam, Antwerp, and Hamburg, 1648-1790 (Cambridge University Press, 2014) 356 pp.
- Regin, Derek. Traders, artists, burghers: A cultural history of Amsterdam in the 17th century (1976)
- Roekholt, Richter. A short history of Amsterdam (2004)
- Shorto, Russell. Amsterdam: A History of the World's Most Liberal City. New York: Vintage Books 2014. ISBN 9780307743756

== List of works, arranged chronologically ==
=== Published in the 17th-18th centuries ===
in English

- Monsieur de Blainville (1757), "Amsterdam", Travels through Holland, Germany, Switzerland, but especially Italy, translated by Turnbull, London: John Noon
- Joseph Marshall (1772), "Amsterdam", Travels through Holland, Flanders, Germany, Denmark, Sweden, Lapland, Russia, the Ukraine, and Poland, in the years 1768, 1769, and 1770, London: Printed for J. Almon, OCLC 3354484

in Dutch

- Caspar Commelijn (1693). Beschrijvinge van Amsterdam [Description of Amsterdam] (in Dutch). Amsterdam: Wolfgang, Waasberge, Boom, van Someren en Goethals.

=== Published in the 19th century ===
in English

- "Amsterdam". A Geographical, Historical and Political Description of the Empire of Germany, Holland, the Netherlands, Switzerland, Prussia, Italy, Sicily, Corsica and Sardinia: With a Gazetteer. London: John Stockdale. 1800. OCLC 79519893.
- "Amsterdam". Galignani's Traveller's Guide through Holland and Belgium (4th ed.). Paris: A. and W. Galignani. 1822. hdl:2027/njp.32101073846667.
- Jedidiah Morse; Richard C. Morse (1823), "Amsterdam", A New Universal Gazetteer (4th ed.), New Haven: S. Converse
- David Brewster, ed. (1830). "Amsterdam". Edinburgh Encyclopaedia. Edinburgh: William Blackwood. hdl:2027/mdp.39015082314801.
- "Some Account of the City of Amsterdam". Saturday Magazine. 4. London. January 1834. hdl:2027/mdp.39015082315386.
- "Amsterdam", Hand-Book for Travellers on the Continent (2nd ed.), London: John Murray, 1838, OCLC 2030550
- Francis Coghlan (1847), "Amsterdam", Handbook for European Tourists through Belgium, Holland (2nd ed.), London: H. Hughes
- J. Willoughby Rosse (1858). "Amsterdam". Index of Dates ... Facts in the Chronology and History of the World. London: H.G. Bohn. hdl:2027/uva.x030807786 – via HathiTrust.
- Francis Coghlan (1863), "Amsterdam", Coghlan's Illustrated Guide to the Rhine (18th ed.), London: Trubner & Co.
- "Amsterdam", Cook's Tourist's Handbook for Holland, Belgium, and the Rhine, Thomas Cook and Son, 1874, OCLC 9054680
- "Amsterdam", Handbook for travellers in Holland and Belgium (19th ed.), London: John Murray, 1876, OCLC 221452961
- John Ramsay McCulloch (1880), "Amsterdam", in Hugh G. Reid (ed.), A Dictionary, Practical, Theoretical and Historical of Commerce and Commercial Navigation, London: Longmans, Green, and Co.
- W. Pembroke Fetridge (1885), "Amsterdam", Harper's Hand-Book for Travellers in Europe and the East, New York: Harper & Brothers
- "Amsterdam", Belgium and Holland (3rd ed.), Leipsic: Karl Baedeker, 1891, OCLC 5624932
- "Amsterdam", Bradshaw's illustrated hand-book for Belgium and the Rhine, Bradshaw's Guide, London: Adams & Sons, 1895, p. 186+

in other languages

- Le Guide d'Amsterdam (in French). Amsterdam: C. Covens. 1802. hdl:2027/ucm.5319397555. (Contents)
- J. ter Gouw (1879). Geschiedenis van Amsterdam [History of Amsterdam] (in Dutch). Amsterdam: Scheltema & Holkema.
  - v.1 to 1350
  - v.2 1350–1555
  - v.3 1555–1578
  - v.4 1578–1713
  - v.5 1713–1795
  - v.6 1795–1813
  - v.7 1813-ca.1879
- "Amsterdam". Brockhaus' Konversations-Lexikon (in German) (14th ed.). Leipzig: Brockhaus. 1896. hdl:2027/njp.32101064064429.

=== Published in the 20th century ===
in English

- "Amsterdam". Chambers's Encyclopaedia. London. 1901. hdl:2027/uc2.ark:/13960/t5bc48059.
- Hamburg-Amerikanische Packetfahrt-Actien-Gesellschaft (1903), "Amsterdam", Guide through Germany, Austria-Hungary, Switzerland, Italy, France, Belgium, Holland, the United Kingdom, Spain, Portugal, &c (4th ed.), Berlin: J.H. Herz, OCLC 36795367
- "Amsterdam", Jewish Encyclopedia, vol. 1, New York, 1907, hdl:2027/osu.32435029752946
- C.B. Black (1908). "Amsterdam". Holland: its Rail, Tram, and Waterways (3rd ed.). London: Adam and Charles Black.
- "Amsterdam". Guide to Holland. Ward, Lock and Co., LTD. Illustrated guide-books (5th ed.). London: Ward, Lock and Co. c. 1909. hdl:2027/njp.32101073701508.
- "Amsterdam", Belgium and Holland, including the Grand-Duchy of Luxembourg, Leipzig: Karl Baedeker, 1910, OCLC 397759
- "Amsterdam (Holland)" . Encyclopædia Britannica. Vol. 1 (11th ed.). 1911. pp. 896–898.
- Esther Singleton (1913), "City of Amsterdam", Great Cities of Europe, Garden City, N.Y.: Doubleday, Page
- W. Dougill (May 1931). "Amsterdam: Its Town Planning Development". Town Planning Review. 14 (3): 194. doi:10.3828/tpr.14.3.e7305921l6228626.
- Ian F. Finlay (July 1953). "The Carillons of Amsterdam". Galpin Society Journal. 6.
- John Joseph Murray (1967), Amsterdam in the Age of Rembrandt, Centers of Civilization Series, USA: University of Oklahoma Press, OL 5538411M
- Peter Burke (1974). Venice and Amsterdam: A Study of Seventeenth-Century Elites.
- Robert Cohen (1987). ""Memoria Para Os Siglos Futuros": Myth and Memory on the Beginnings of the Amsterdam Sephardi Community". Jewish History. 2 (1): 67–72. doi:10.1007/BF01651513. JSTOR 20101033. S2CID 162340251.

in other languages

- Louis Dumont-Wilden (1913). Amsterdam & Harlem. Les villes d'art célèbres (in French). Paris: H. Laurens.
- Henri Zondervan, ed. (1914), "Amsterdam", Winkler Prins' Geillustreerde Encyclopaedie (in Dutch), vol. 1 (4th ed.), Amsterdam: Uitgevers-Maatschappy "Elsevier", hdl:2027/mdp.39015068310187

=== Published in the 21st century ===
- Angela Vanhaelen (2003), Comic Print and Theatre in Early Modern Amsterdam, Ashgate Publishing, ISBN 9780754608448
- Marietta Haffner; Marja Elsinga (2009). "Deadlocks and breakthroughs in urban renewal: a network analysis in Amsterdam". Journal of Housing and the Built Environment. 24 (2): 147–165. doi:10.1007/s10901-009-9137-1. JSTOR 41107458.
- Liza Nell; Jan Rath, eds. (2010), Ethnic Amsterdam: immigrants and urban change in the twentieth century, Amsterdam: Amsterdam University Press, ISBN 9789089641687
- Marco De Waard, ed. (2012). Imagining Global Amsterdam: History, Culture, and Geography in a World City. Amsterdam University Press. ISBN 978-9089643674.
- Colum Hourihane, ed. (2012). "Amsterdam". Grove Encyclopedia of Medieval Art and Architecture. Oxford University Press. ISBN 978-0-19-539536-5.
- Mak, Geert, and Philip Blom. Amsterdam: A Brief Life of the City. Vintage Digital, 2010.

== Bibliographies ==
- G. van Herwijnen, ed. (1978). "Holland: Amsterdam". Bibliografie van de stedengeschiedenis van Nederland [Bibliography of Urban History in the Netherlands] (in Dutch). Brill. pp. 153+. ISBN 90-04-05700-5.

== See also ==
- History of Amsterdam
