= Uitmarkt =

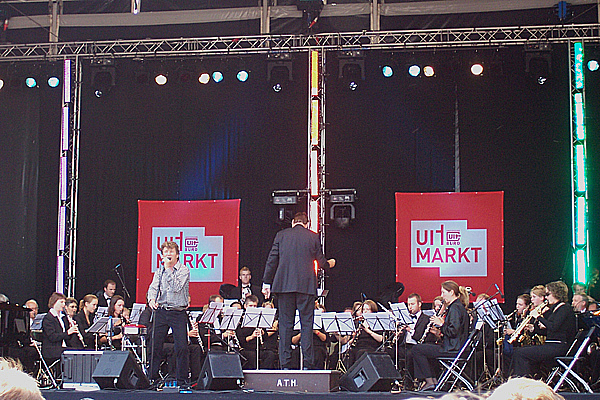
Symfonisch Blaasorkest ATH at the Uitmarkt 2006

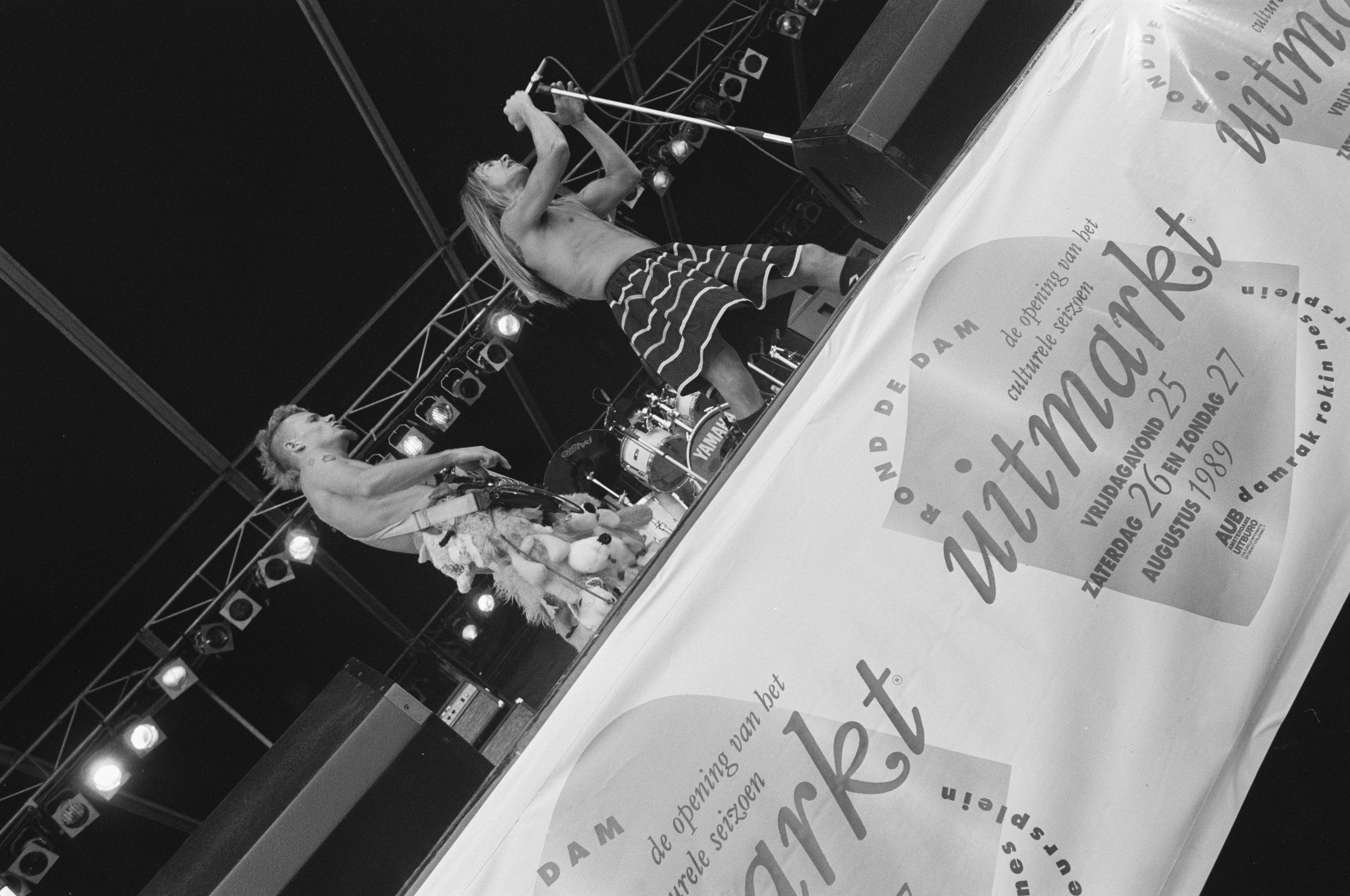
Red Hot Chili Peppers (Uitmarkt, 1989)

Between 1978 and 2022, the Uitmarkt (Dutch pronunciation: [ˈœytmɑr(ə)kt]; English: Out Market) was an annual event in Amsterdam during the last weekend of August. It was held in the inner city of Amsterdam, and/or at the Museumplein, and marked the start of the new cultural season.

The last edition to be held under this name was in 2022. In 2023, it was replaced with a much smaller event under the name 'De Opening'. While the first edition was held in Amsterdam, subsequent editions were to be held across the country. However, the event did not take place in 2024 because no suitable city could be found.

== History ==
The first Uitmarkt was held on 26 and 27 August 1978 at the Leidseplein. Performances were held at three locations, and there was an information market near the American Hotel. In 1984, the Uitmarkt was held at Dam Square. By now, the event included fourteen stages and 130 information stalls. After having taken place along the Amstel river and at the Nes during a number of years, in 1988 the Uitmarkt moved to the Museumplein.

In 2006, the number of visitors reached a record of half a million, spread out over three days. In 2015 and 2016, the number of visitors also reached about half a million. In 2017, for the first time in eight years, the Uitmarkt was not held at the Museumplein but moved to the Oosterdok area.. The 40th edition of the Uitmarkt in 2017 attracted about 450 thousand visitors.

As of 2020, a stripped-down version of the event was organised due to Covid. Although Covid restrictions had been lifted by 2022, the event did not return to its original scale, and it attracted just 75 thousand visitors.

Years	Locations
2021-2022	Museumplein
2020	Concertgebouw, Melkweg, Vondelpark Openluchttheater, Oude Kerk, Stopera
2019	Museumplein and Leidseplein
2017-2018	Oosterdok area, Muziekgebouw aan 't IJ, NEMO, Marineterrein en Scheepvaartmuseum
2010-2016	Museumplein, Leidseplein and Vondelpark
2009	Dam, Nieuwmarkt, Waterlooplein and Hermitage
2007-2008	Oostelijk Havengebied, Piet Heinkade, Kop van het Java-eiland, Oosterdokseiland and Oosterdok
2006	Dam, Nieuwmarkt, Waterlooplein and Nes
2001-2005	Museumplein area
