= Obrechtkerk =

- Kerk van Onze Lieve Vrouw van de Allerheiligste Rozenkrans (Dutch); Church of Our Lady of the Most Holy Rosary (English)
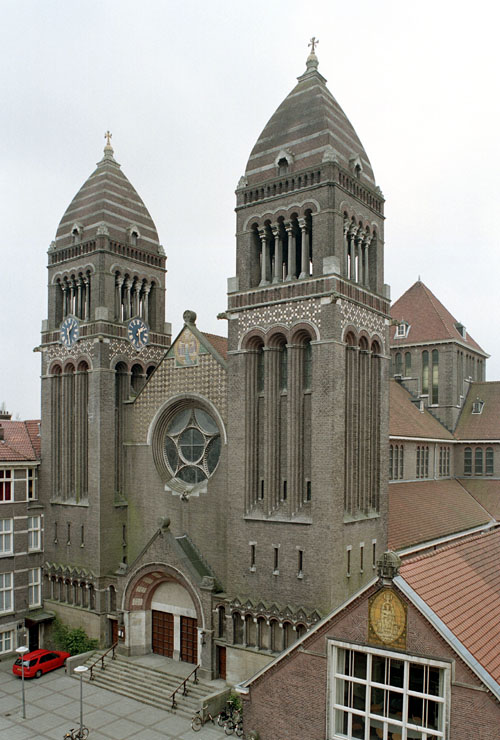
- Obrechtkerk in 2008
- Obrechtkerk
- 52°21′21″N 4°52′30″E
- Location: Jacob Obrechtstraat 30, 1071 KM; Amsterdam, Netherlands
- Denomination: Roman Catholic
- Website: www.obrechtkerk.nl

Architecture
- Architect(s): Joseph Cuypers, Jan Stuyt
- Style: Neo-Byzantine, Romanesque Revival
- Years built: 1908-1911

Administration
- Diocese: Haarlem-Amsterdam
- Parish: Our Lady of the most Holy Rosary

The Obrechtkerk (Dutch: Kerk van Onze Lieve Vrouw van de Allerheiligste Rozenkrans) (Church of Our Lady of the Most Holy Rosary) is the common name for the Roman Catholic church located on the Jacob Obrechtstraat, nearby the Vondelpark in Amsterdam, Netherlands.

== Construction ==
This Romanesque Revival cruciform basilica was built between 1908 and 1911. It was designed by Joseph Cuypers and Jan Stuyt. Cuypers already started building the Cathedral of St Bavo, Haarlem, in 1898, which was completed in 1930. Its architectural style clearly signified a transition from Gothic Revival to a new ecclesiastical architecture. In the first phase of building the Sint Bavo, Stuyt was chief supervisor during the execution.

The design of the Obrecht Church, made jointly by Cuypers and Stuyt, dates from 1905 in the Historicism views that was followed by both architects at the time. It's a church built in Neo-Byzantine and Romanesque Revival style with a front-side that faces east, flanked by two tall towers with a lower crossing tower on the west side.

The building was consecrated in 1911 by Mgr. A.J. Callier (Augustinus Callier), the bishop of Haarlem. Many artists contributed to the decoration of the church, including Jan Eloy Brom, Joep Nicolas, Otto van Rees, John Rädecker, Matthieu Wiegman, Kees Dunselman, Nico Witteman and Mari Andriessen.

The church is dedicated to Our Lady of the Rosary.

== Collaboration ==
The Obrecht parish works closely with the Agnes parish of the Sint-Agnes church on the Amstelveenseweg.

== Tower clock ==
On the tower clock the Roman numerals 9 and 11 are reversed.
