= Amsteldorp =

- Neighborhood
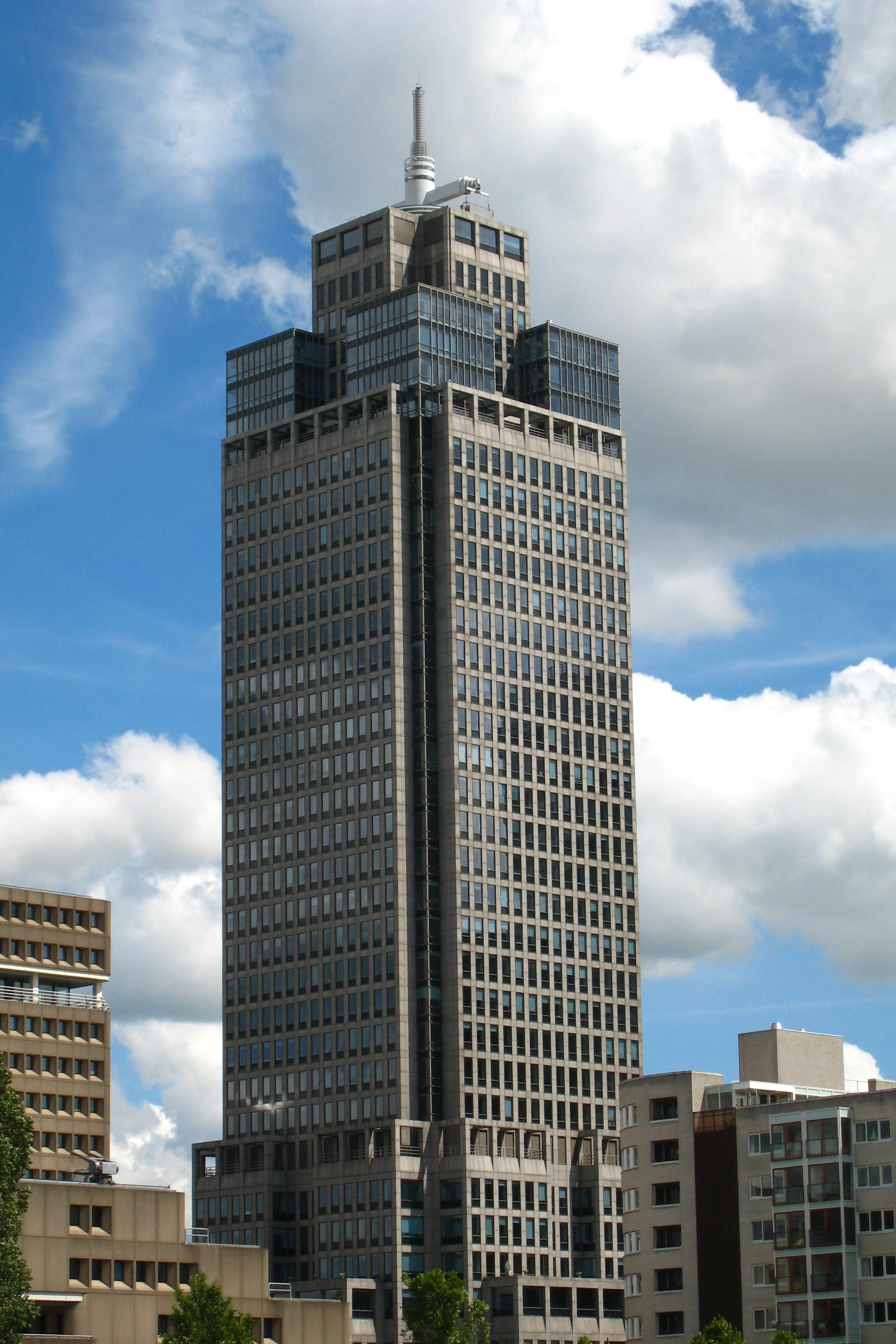
- Rembrandt Tower
- Interactive map of Amsteldorp
- Country: Netherlands
- Province: North Holland
- COROP: Amsterdam
- Time zone: CET (UTC+01)
  - Summer (DST): CEST (UTC+02)

Amsteldorp is a neighborhood of Amsterdam, Netherlands. The neighborhood dates from the 1920s but many houses were built in 1947–48 and in the 1950s. The Amstel Station is located within this area, which was built in 1939, and the tallest building in the neighbourhood is Rembrandt Tower, with a height of 150 metres.
