= Palingoproer =

1886 uprising in Amsterdam

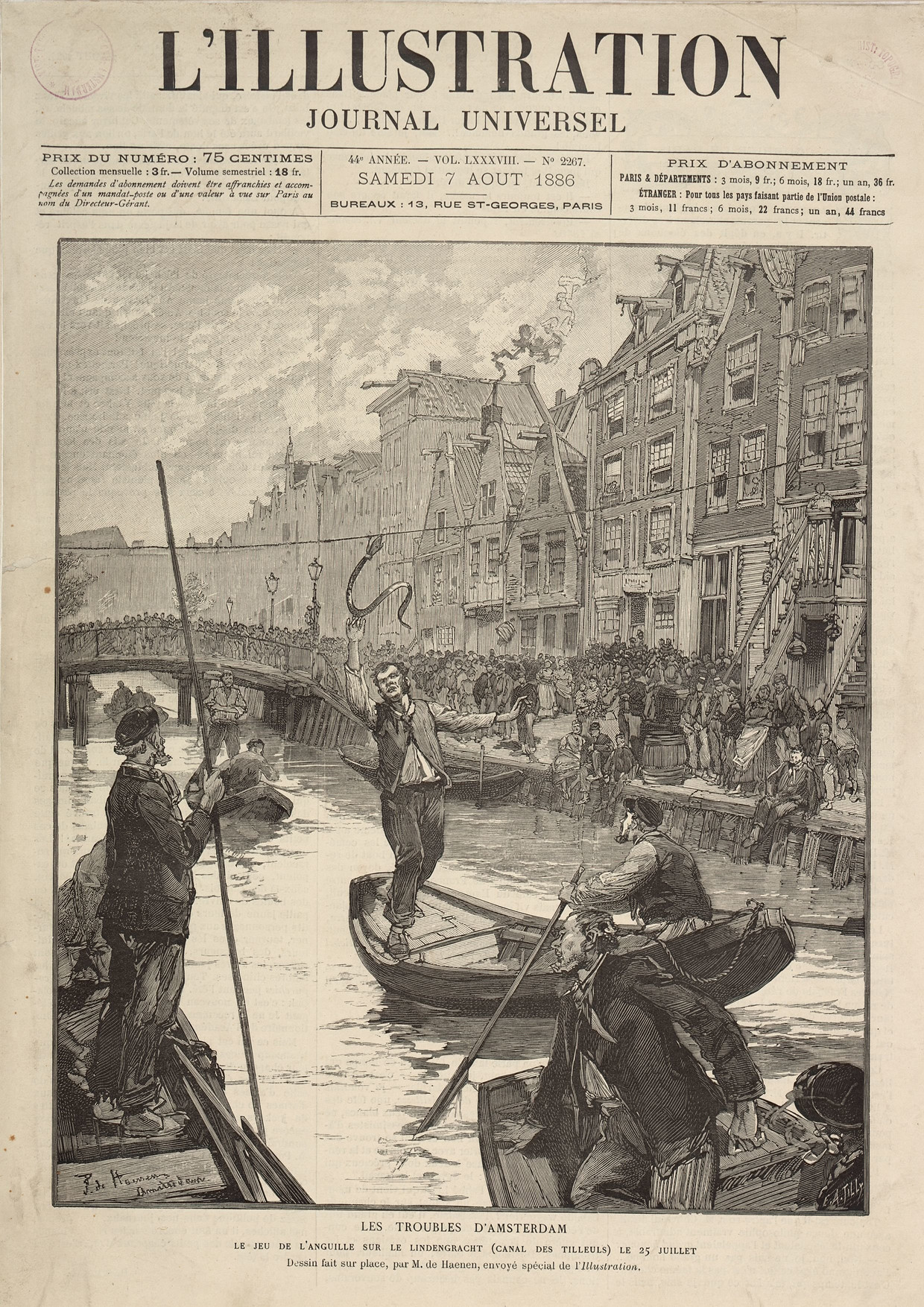
Eel pulling

The Palingoproer or the Eel riot was a popular uprising in the Jordaan in Amsterdam on 25 and 26 July 1886. The riots started when the police tried to thwart playing the forbidden game of eel pulling on the Lindengracht. In the uproar that followed, 26 people were killed. Social historians place the events in a context of social tensions as a result of increasing socio-economic differences in 19th-century Amsterdam society.

== Background ==
Palingtrekken, meaning eel pulling or eel drawing, was an old Amsterdam game. A rope was stretched over a canal, and a live eel was hung from it. The players had to sail underneath in boats and try to grab the slippery eel, with the risk of ending up in the water. Eel pulling was banned by the government as "cruel public entertainment".

On Sunday 25 July 1886, a game of eel-pulling had started on the Lindengracht, which had not yet been filled in, when the police intervened. Police officers cut the rope on which the eel was hanging. The spectators then turned on the officers. One officer was pulled into a basement and beaten there. The other agents managed to make their way through the enraged crowd with swords drawn to get reinforcements. The police acted harshly, but only managed to restore order at 10 that night, when most people went home.

== Monday 26 July ==
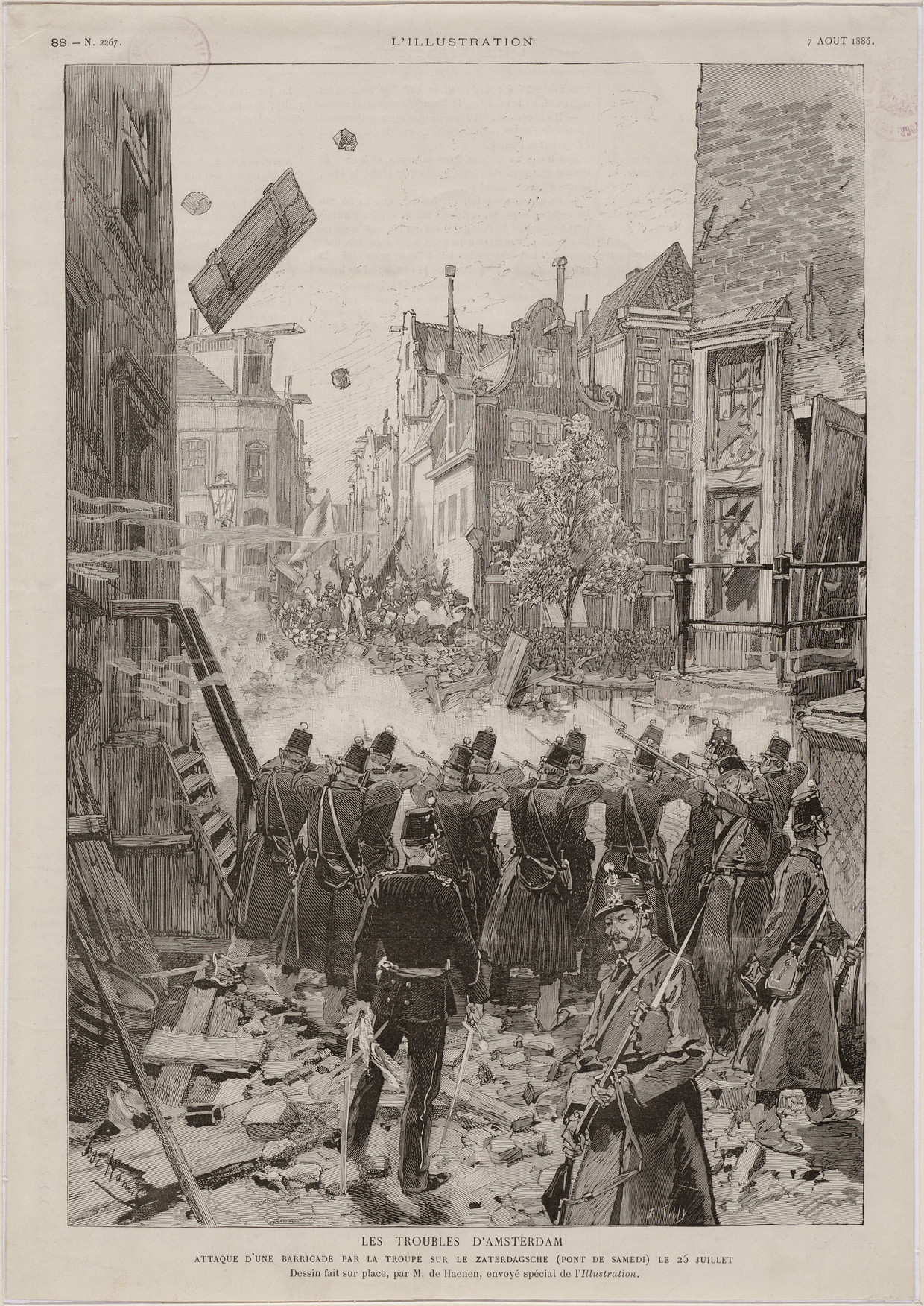
The army firing on the crowd

On Monday 26 July 1886, riots broke out again. A crowd armed with sticks and rods besieged the police station. The cornered agents had to call in reinforcements and eventually even ask the army to intervene. A terrible fight broke out, streets were broken up and barricades erected. The Jordaan inhabitants pelted the police from their roofs with everything they could lay their hands on. The army fired back with live ammunition. When peace returned the following day, 26 people had been killed and many injured.

== Aftermath ==
After the uproar, there was a lot of criticism in the press of the police action. According to The New Guide of January 1887, a sack race had been organized the previous Sunday, which the police had turned a blind eye to. Afterwards, the locals decided to organize an eel-pulling contest on the next Sunday. The police could have prevented the riot by acting earlier and more tactfully.

Others saw a socialist plot behind the riot, but at the trial of a number of arrested rioters at the end of 1886, the public prosecutor stated that he had found nothing of a plot.
