= Fusilladeplaats Rozenoord =

World War II memorial in Amsterdam

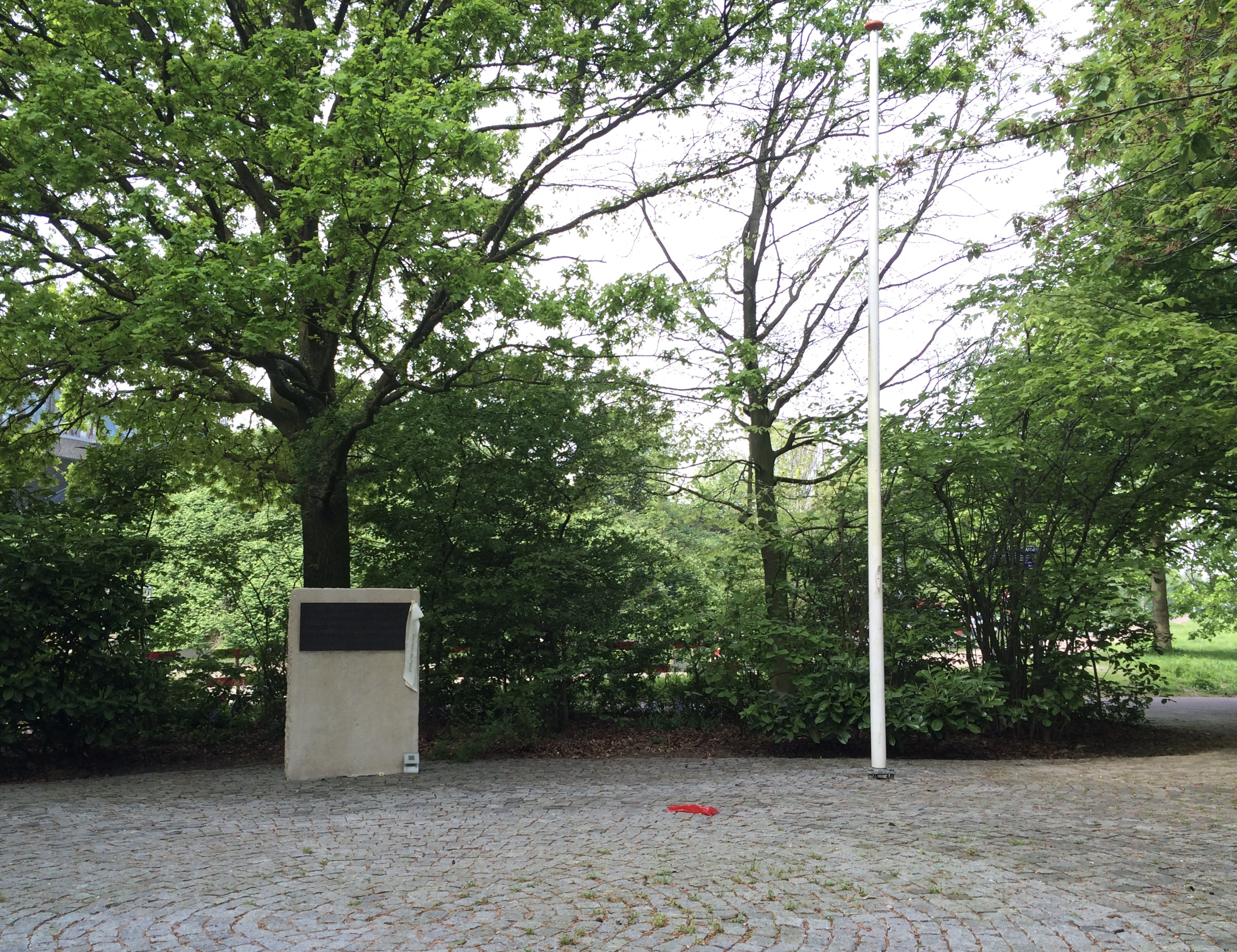
- Interactive map of Fusilladeplaats Rozenoord
- Location: Amsterdam, Netherlands
- Coordinates: 52°20′02″N 4°53′55″E
- Type: war memorial (World War II)

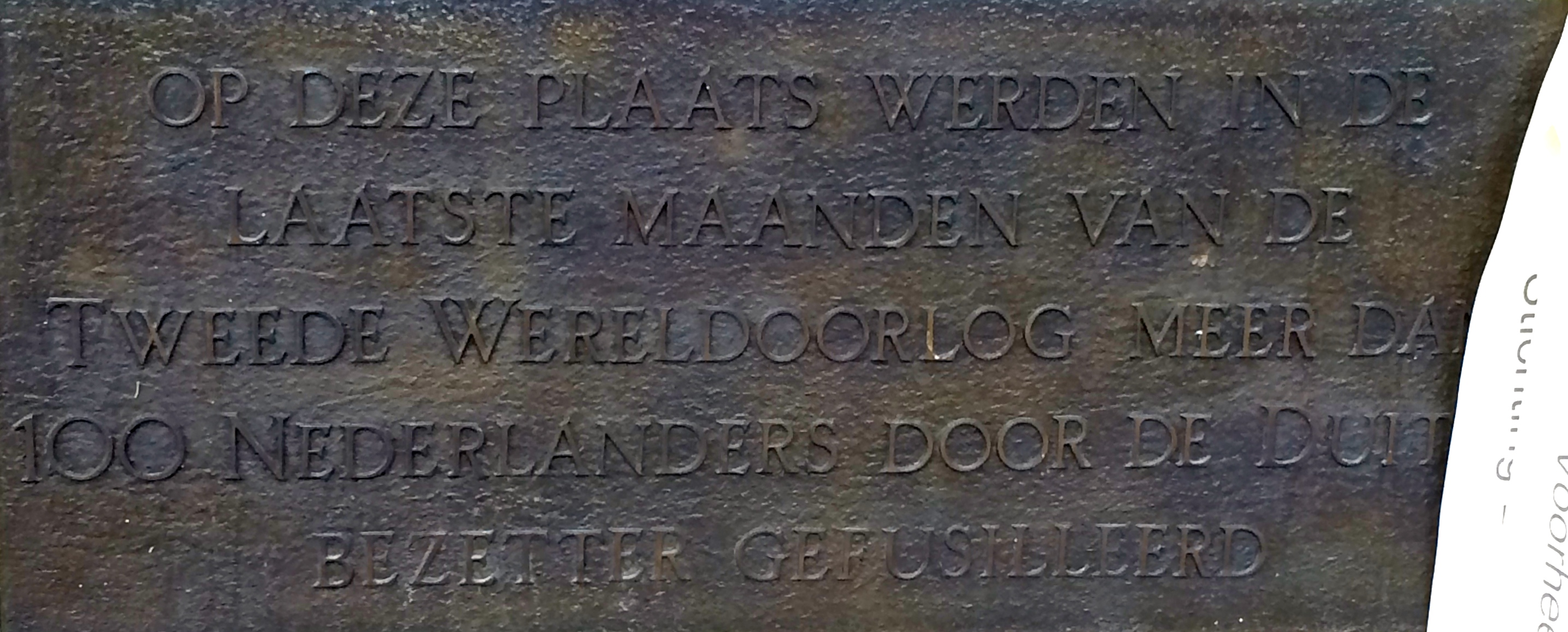
The memorial plaque

Fusilladeplaats Rozenoord is a World War II memorial in the Dutch city of Amsterdam.

'Fusilladeplaats' might be translated into English as 'firing squad place'. 'Rozenoord' was originally a rose garden, whose name was adopted during the 1930s by a teahouse by the Amsteldijk, a dyke in Amsterdam.

Between 18 January and 14 April 1945, German occupation forces shot dead more than 100 Dutch civilians at Fusilladeplaats Rozenoord (at least that many have been identified, several of them resistance fighters). Those events are commemorated 4 May every year. It seems that no-one ever faced trial for those crimes.

The inscription on the memorial plaque reads:

Op deze plaats werden in de
laatste maanden van de
Tweede Wereldoorlog meer dan
100 Nederlanders door de Duitse
bezetter gefusilleerd

An English translation:

At this place, during the last months of the Second World War, the German occupiers shot dead more than 100 Dutch people.

In 2014, Dutch artist and sculptor Ram Katzir designed another memorial (Monument Rozenoord) for Fusilladeplaats Rozenoord. It consists of an arrangement of empty chairs on concrete plates with the names of the known victims. There is also one plate for the unknown victims. In 2018, research delivered six other names of victims, so six extra chairs were placed. This monument is situated in Amstelpark.
