= Railroad strikes of 1903 in the Netherlands =

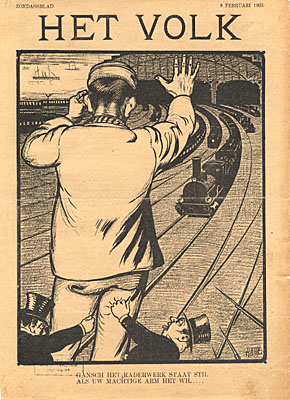
"The entire gearwork stops, if your mighty hand wills it" - cartoon by Albert Hahn

The railroad strikes of 1903 were strikes in the Netherlands by the railway staff regarding the right of workers to organize into a union and negotiate and implement the right to strike.

At the beginning of the 20th century, some employers allowed their workers to have union membership, while in some companies, union membership was obligatory. This led, in January 1903, to a labor dispute in the Amsterdam harbor, which soon spread across the country.
