= 290 Square Meters =

Retail shop in Amsterdam, Netherlands

Coordinates: 52°22′7.7″N 4°54′8.3″E

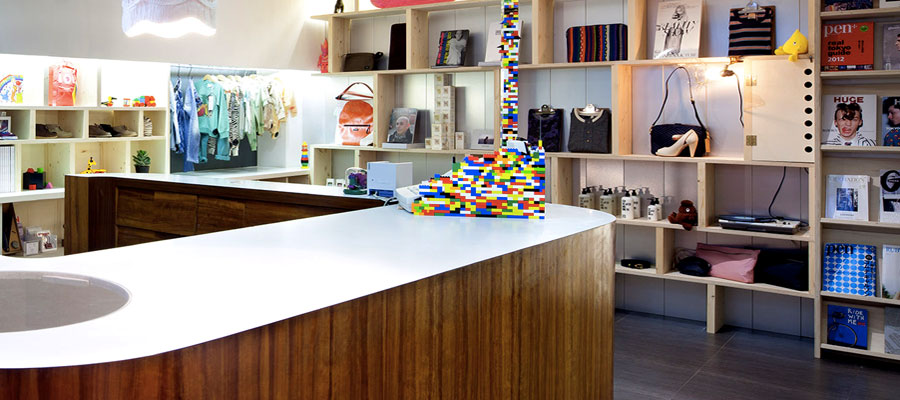
- Interior of 290 Square Meters
- Type: Retail shop
- Founded: 2001
- Founder: Ido de Voos
- Headquarters: Houtkopersdwarsstraat 3; 1011 Amsterdam, NL
- Website: 290sqm.com

290 Square Meters was a retail shop in Amsterdam, Netherlands. It offered men's and women's fashion as well as limited edition books, jewelry and scents. 290 Square Meters was best known for being the only retail location in the world where one could buy customized NikeID shoes for a number of years. It also carried a number of other unique items by Levi's, Freitag and Arc'teryx Veilance.

Founded by Ido de Voos in 2001, it originally started as 90 Square meters on KNSM Island. Its new location right off Waterlooplein in a former bank vault.

Both the stores original name, 90 Square Meters, and its new name, 290 Square Meters, are derived from the shop's size. The company opened stores in Zürich and Istanbul.

In late 2012 it launched a web shop. It shut down in 2019. The Istanbul shop continued as 1290sqm.
