= Czaar Peterbuurt =

Neighborhood of Amsterdam, Netherlands

Coordinates: 52°22′08″N 4°55′38″E

- Neighborhood of Amsterdam
- Interactive map of Czaar Peterbuurt
- Country: Netherlands
- Province: North Holland
- COROP: Amsterdam
- Time zone: UTC+1 (CET)

Czaar Peterbuurt is a neighborhood of Amsterdam, Netherlands.
