= La Rive =

Coordinates: 52°21′34.95″N 4°54′18.55″E

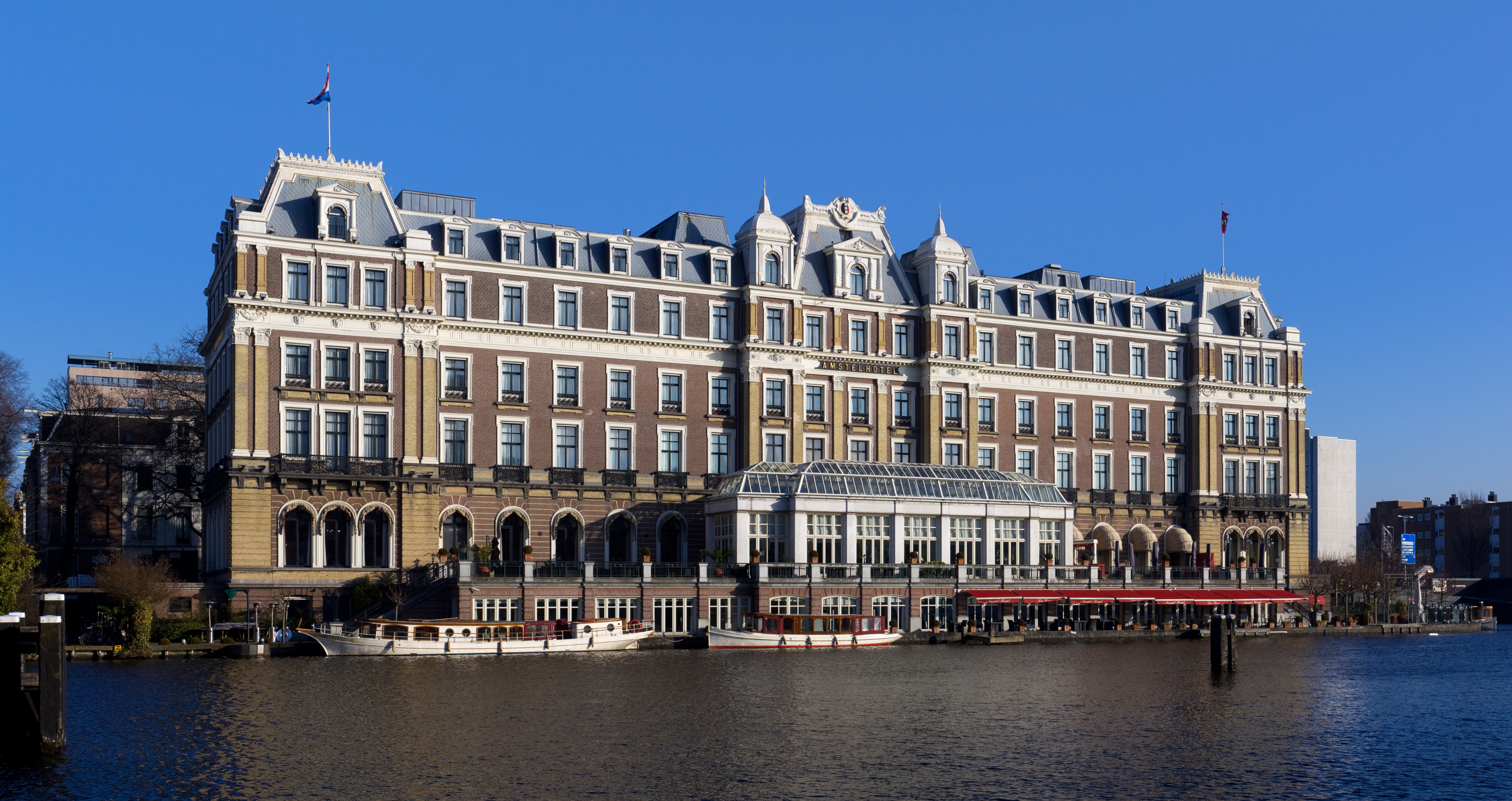
- Amstel Hotel, restaurant La Rive was located under the red canopies.
- Interactive map of La Rive

Restaurant information
- Established: 1994
- Closed: 2020
- Head chef: Roger Rassin
- Food type: French, Mediterranean
- Location: Professor Tulpplein 1, Amsterdam, 1018 GX, Netherlands
- Seating capacity: 50
- Reservations: yes
- Website: La Rive

La Rive is a former restaurant that was located in the InterContinental Amstel Amsterdam, Netherlands. It was a fine dining restaurant that was awarded one or more Michelin stars from 1993 to 2016. GaultMillau awarded the restaurant 18.0 points (out of 20 possible). The restaurant closed in 2020.

Last head chef was Roger Rassin (2008–2020). Former head chefs were, amongst others, Robert Kranenborg (1992–2000) and Edwin Katz (2000–2008)

The restaurant was a member of Alliance Gastronomique Néerlandaise, a Dutch/Belgian culinary association of quality restaurants.

== Star history ==
- 1993-1996: one star
- 1997-2000: two stars
- 2001: one star
- 2002-2005: two stars
- 2006-2016: one star

== See also ==
- List of Michelin starred restaurants in the Netherlands
