= Rialto (theater) =

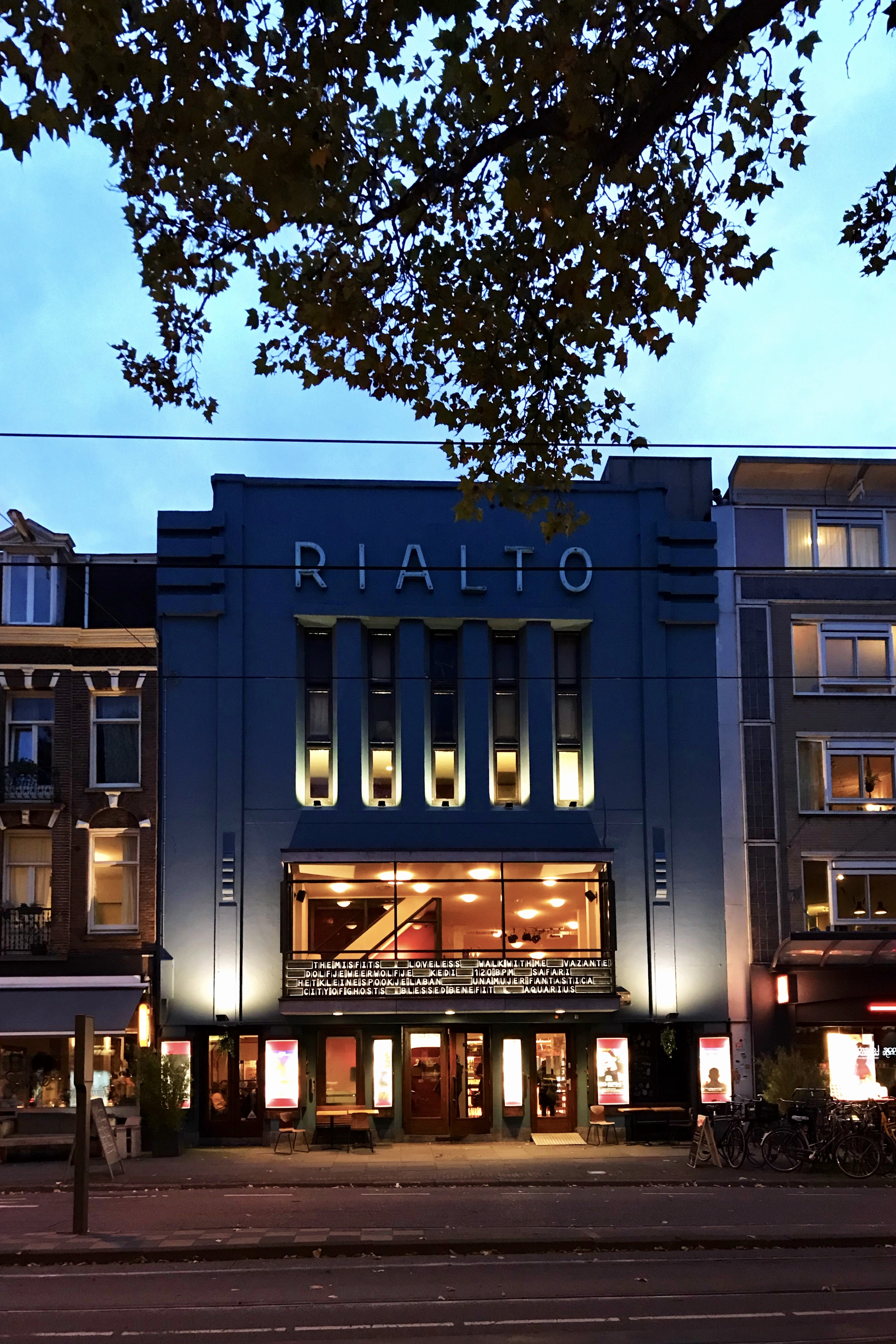

General information
- Status: Completed
- Address: Ceintuurbaan 338
- Town or city: Amsterdam
- Country: Netherlands
- Coordinates: 52.353056°N 4.893889°E
- Opening: 1920

Rialto is a cinema at Ceintuurbaan in the De Pijp neighborhood in Amsterdam.

Rialto is the premier theatre for the film distributors EYE Film Institute Netherlands, Contact Film, Cinemien and Park Junior and regularly organizes festivals and special events, such as readings, discussions and introductions to shown films. More than fifty volunteers work at the theatre. The biennial CinemAsia film festival is also held there.

The building that Rialto occupies was built in 1920 and was designed by the architect Jan van Schaik commissioned by film enthusiast Anton Pieter du Mée. Since 1982, the theatre has been in use by the Stichting Amsterdams Filmhuis.

Rialto participates in a partnership with Cineville.
