= Dubbeltjespanden =

Pair of building complexes in Amsterdam, the Netherlands

Coordinates: 52°21′42.43″N 4°55′1.94″E

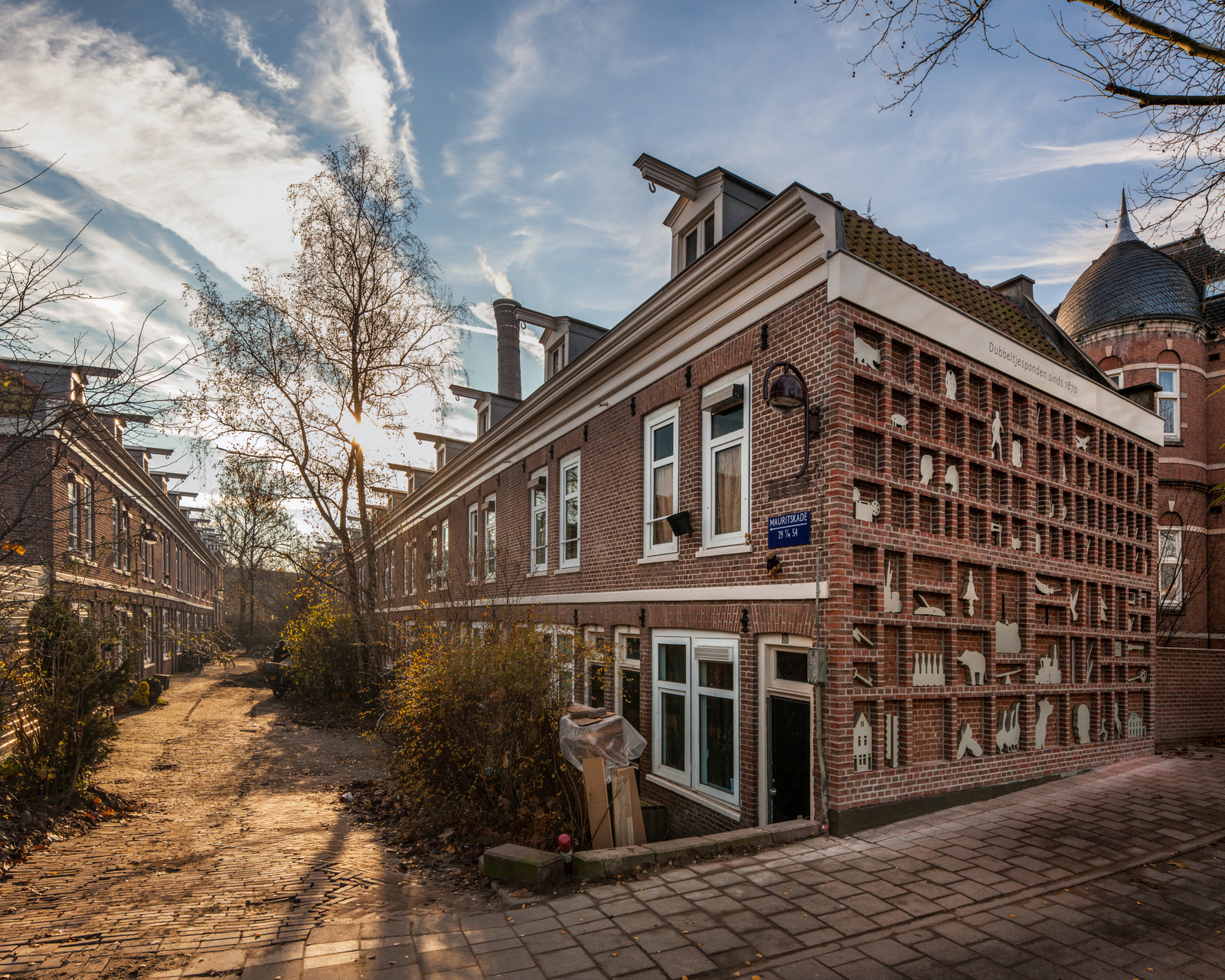
De Dubbeltjespanden aan de Mauritskade.

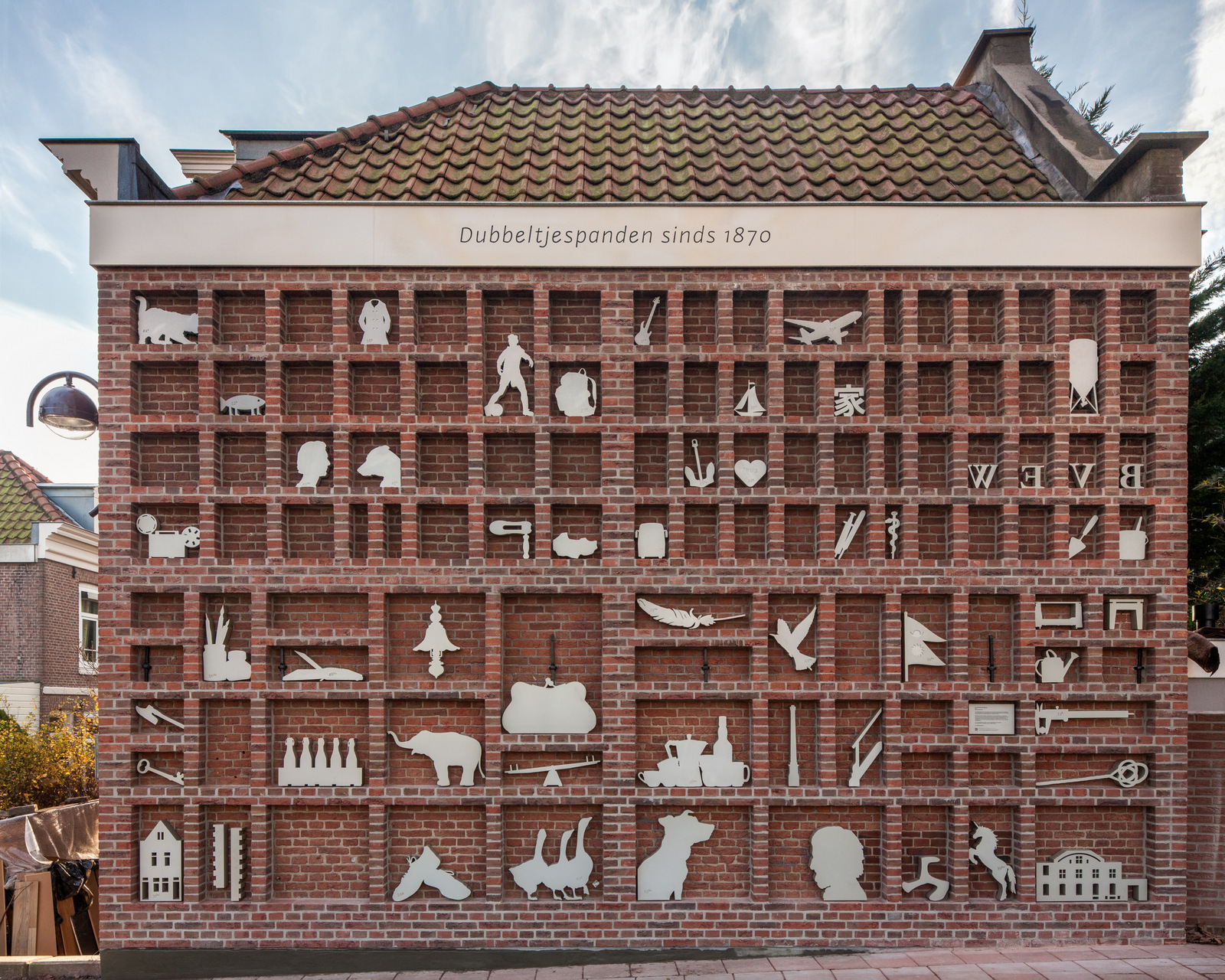
Kunstwerk bij de Dubbeltjespanden aan de Mauritskade.

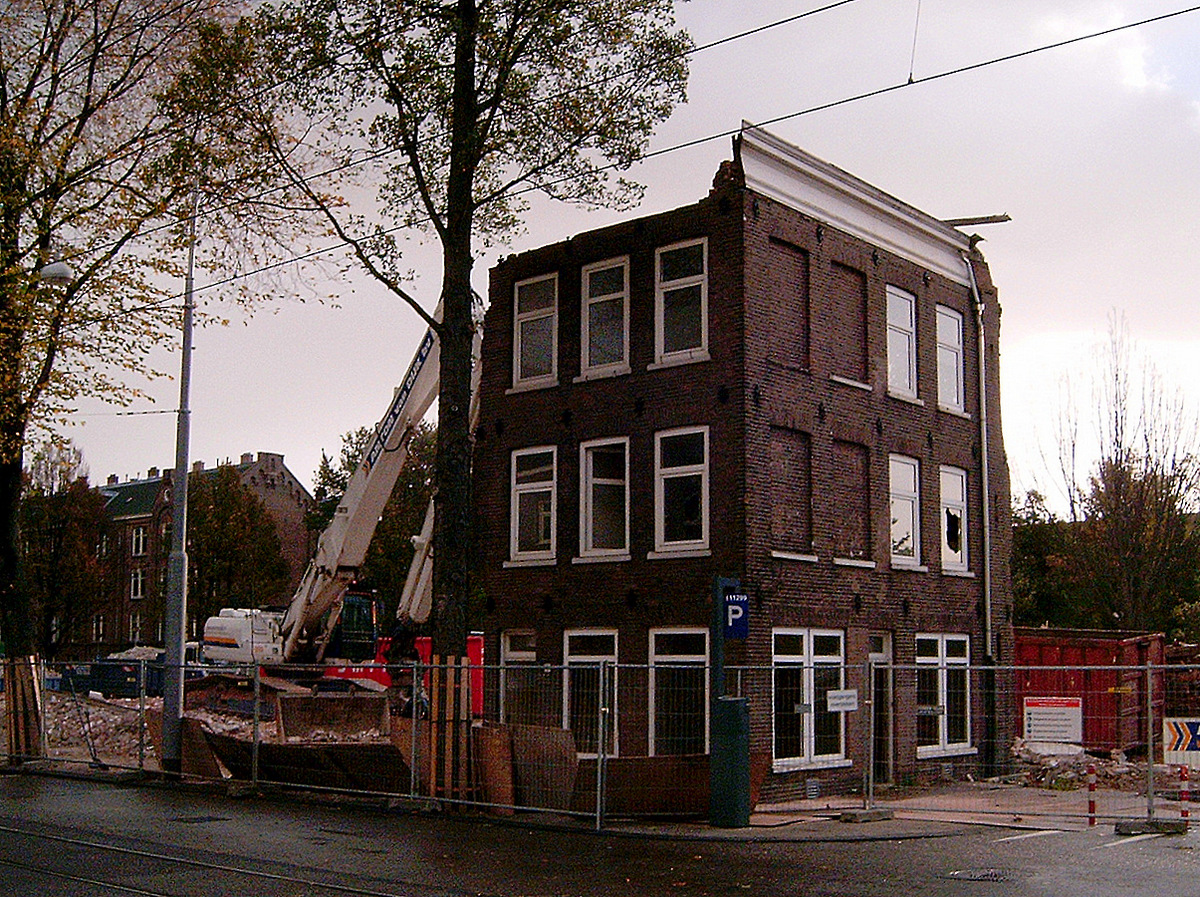
Laatste ‘Dubbeltjespand’ in de Czaar Peterstraat in 2006.

Two building complexes in Amsterdam, Netherlands, are identified by the name Dime Buildings (Dubbeltjespanden): Mauritskade no. 29 to no. 54, and some no longer extant buildings in the block Czaar Peter Straat/Blankenstraat. Both housing projects were realized in the late 19th century by the Bouwmaatschappij tot Verkrijging van Eigen Woningen BVEW (Construction Company for the Establishment of Privately Owned Homes), the first cooperative housing association in Amsterdam.

The name 'Dime Buildings' has to do with the weekly dubbeltje ("dime") dues that members of the BVEW paid to the construction company. By paying the rent and the deposit of the dime, residents would become owners of their own home after twenty years. This was ultimately unsuccessful.

== Dime Buildings Mauritskade ==
The twenty eight buildings (containing fifty-six homes) at the Mauritskade form a street, and were built to a design by architect J. W. Zoutseling. The street was the first project of the BVEW, a construction company founded in 1868 to unite forces to improve the living conditions of workers.

The first four Dime Buildings date from March 1872. Due to (financial) problems of the construction company, the construction of other buildings was delayed. The main part of the street was completed in 1878. In 1885, the last two buildings were built. The rent amounted to fl 1.75 (€ 0.80) per week in 1878. The buildings consisted of two storeys, each with private access. The size of the homes was approximately 30 sqm.

The street is now highly valued for its cultural and historical significance.

Artwork

The current owner, housing corporation Woonstichting De Key, substantially renovated the premises in 2012. On the occasion of the completion of the renovation, artist Marjet Wessels Boer designed a type case with objects that refer to the past and present of the street.

== Dime Buildings Czaar Peter Street ==
A block in the Czaar Peter Straat was also known as the ‘Dime Buildings'. These homes were the second construction project of the BVEW and were built between 1878 and 1880. In 2001, a major gas explosion took place in this residential location, injuring several people. In 2006, the buildings were demolished to make way for new-builds. At the site of the former Dime Buildings now stands a residential and care centre, De Keyzer.
