= Expansion of Amsterdam since the 19th century =

Aspect of the history of Amsterdam

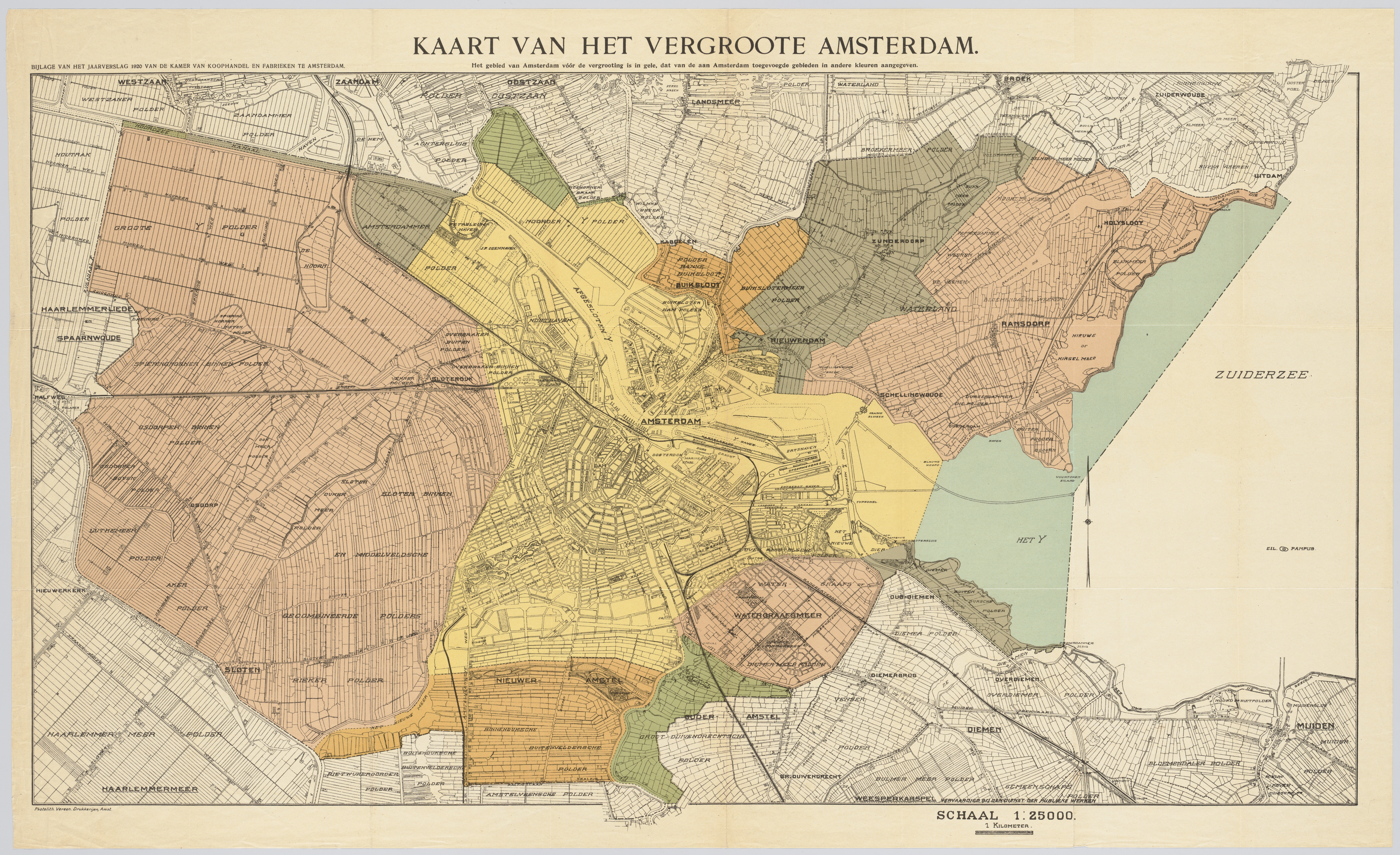
Map of the Enlarged Amsterdam in 1921. Yellow is the territory of Amsterdam before the annexations. All other colored areas are the incorporated municipalities in 1921.

The Dutch city of Amsterdam has had many planned expansions over the past two centuries.

== Samuel Sarphati ==
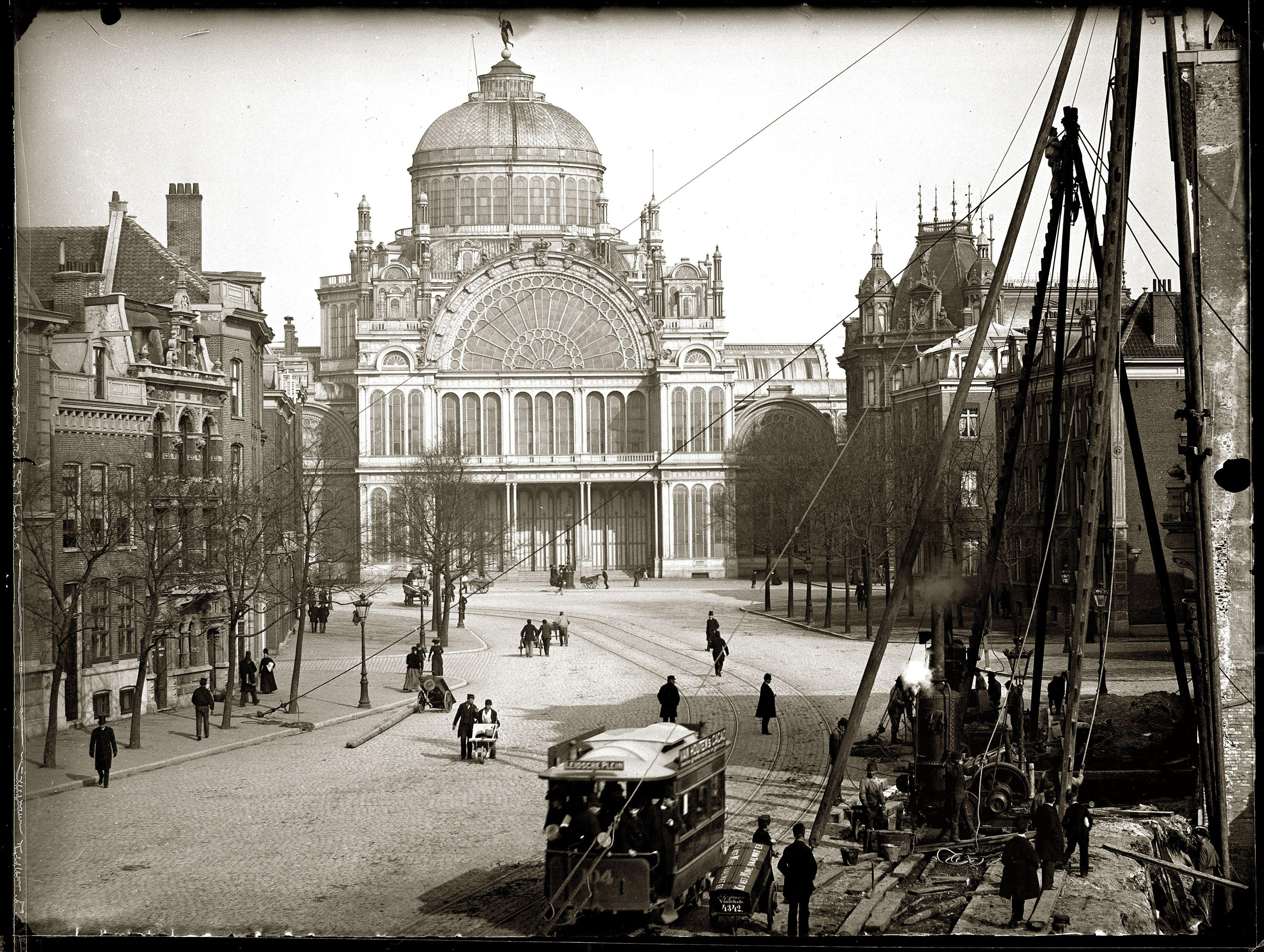
Paleis van Volksvlijt

Samuel Sarphati was a doctor in 19th century Amsterdam. By working in Amsterdam as a doctor in that period of time, he was confronted with the bad public health of people especially in the poorer neighborhoods. He subsequently undertook steps to improve public health for the people of Amsterdam. One of these steps was an expansion on the south side of the city's center.

This part of Amsterdam would become a neighborhood with the grandeur of Paris or London of that time. It was very different from the older neighborhoods of Amsterdam, which were overcrowded and consisted of small streets. His expansion consisted of a central wide street with large public buildings on it and smaller side streets. He financed it with the support of rich inhabitants of Amsterdam. This main street would later become known as the Sarphatistraat in his honour.

Some public buildings that once stood or still stand along this street are the Paleis van Volksvlijt and the Amstel Hotel. The Paleis van Volksvlijt was a large building especially made for exhibitions of all sorts. It was modeled after the Crystal Palace in London. The Amstel Hotel was built as a hotel for visitors of Amsterdam and were now able to stay in the new and improved part of this city.

== The Van Niftrik Plan and the Kalff Plan ==
One of the first plans devised to expand beyond the current city’s center was made by Van Niftrik in 1867. It was rejected in 1868 by the city council, but a small part of the plan was eventually realized. This small part is the northwestern corner of de Pijp adjacent to the city’s center. Its southern border became the Gerard Doustraat. The neighborhood was to be built for the middle class of society, but eventually became a working-class neighborhood.

This neighborhood was expanded in 1876 and onwards to the Ceintuurbaan. This expansion was only a small part of a bigger plan, which was designed by Kalff. The plan consisted of a ring of new neighborhoods, which would come to surround the city’s center. It comprises the Van Lennepbuurt, Da Costabuurt, Helmersbuurt, Frederik Hendrikbuurt, Staatsliedenbuurt, Spaarndammerbuurt, Oosterparkbuurt and a large part of Pijp-Noord.

All of these neighborhoods consist of long, straight and narrow streets, which were densely built. Most of the buildings were built in a typical 19th century eclectic style. Although both plans were executed around the same time, the houses do differ somewhat in style. The houses of the Plan-Van Niftrik have a more stately appearance than those of the Plan-Kalff.

== Gordel ’20-‘40 ==
At the end of the 19th century with the Second Industrial Revolution being at a high, a lot of people from the countryside were moving to Amsterdam in the hopes of finding a job and better life. Because of the large number of people moving into the city, it soon became too populated and a shortage of living space became a fact. In 1901 a new law was signed called the Woningwet. The purpose of this law was to improve housing conditions in large cities in the Netherlands and especially Amsterdam. With this new law, corporations whose purpose was to build affordable houses were eligible to receive financial support from the central Dutch government. As a result of the reform, these corporations grew larger and soon established a dominant position on the residential construction market. Large overcrowded cities were obliged by law to make plans to expand. The architect H. P. Berlage devised such plans. These plans were Plan Zuid and parts of the lesser known Plan West. Plan Zuid and Plan West combined are termed the Gordel ’20-’40, because both plans were executed between the two world wars.

=== Plan Zuid ===
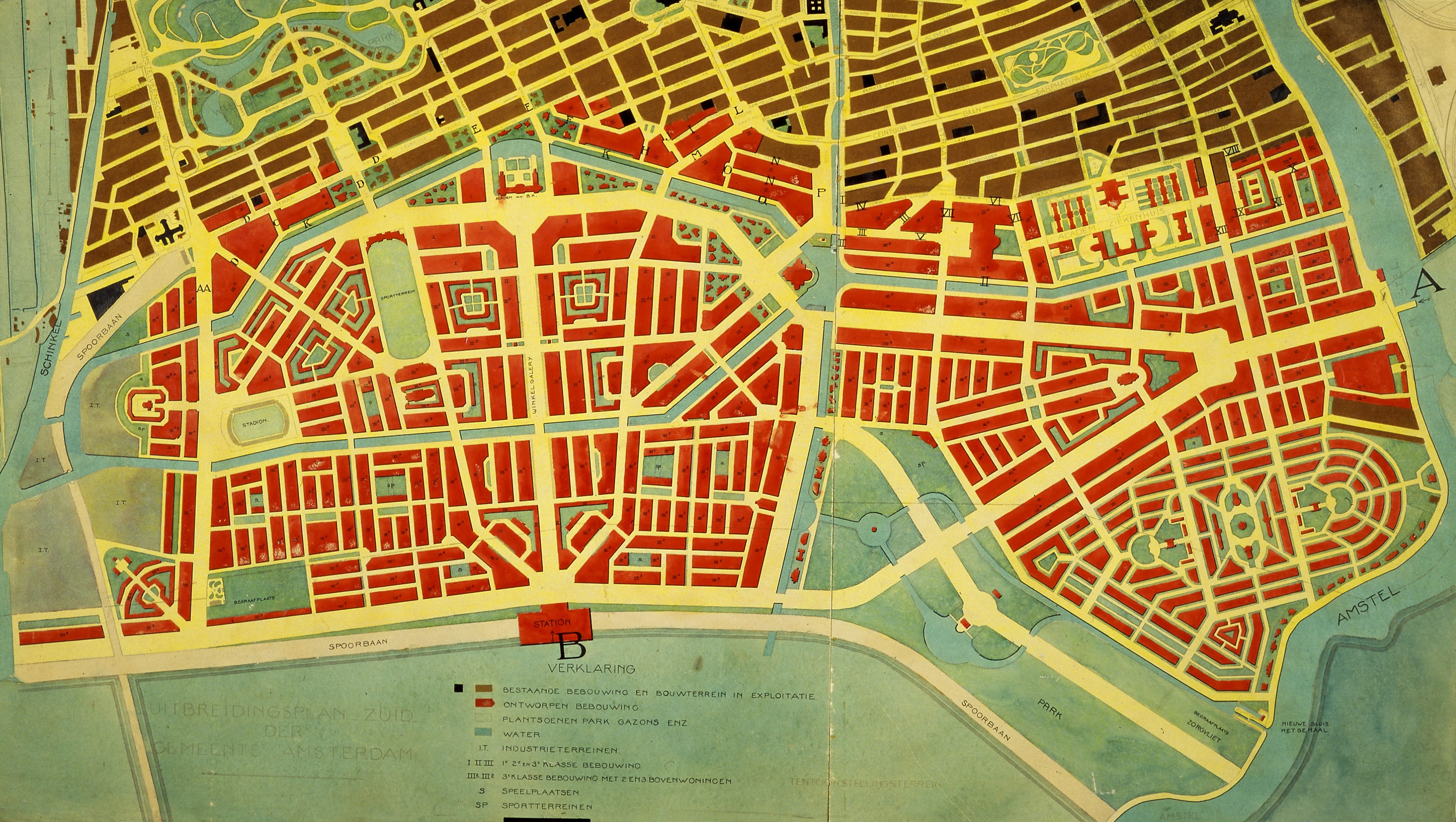
Plan Zuid highlighted in red

Berlage presented this to the city council. At first they rejected his plan, but in 1917 it was accepted after a few adjustments. The plan consisted of a large expansion of the city southwards. It consisted of the following neighborhoods: Stadionbuurt, Apollobuurt, Nieuwe Pijp and Rivierenbuurt. The new neighborhoods were to become very different from the existing ones. The existing neighborhoods consisted mostly of privately owned houses and cramped streets. Berlage’ plan envisioned wide stately streets with smaller side streets, a lot of squares and open spaces and even more greenery. Privately owned houses were a thing of the past, since his plan envisioned large housing blocks. People of all social classes were to inhabit these housing blocks. With this vision he tried to uplift the segregation of social classes in that period of time. In a way he succeeded in doing this. Berlage did not design the housing blocks himself. They were designed by notable architects of that time such as Michel de Klerk in an art deco style known as the Amsterdamse School, or Amsterdam School. The housing blocks became well known for their richly decorated facades and monumental appearance.

=== Plan West ===
Plan West was an expansion of Amsterdam westwards. After the annexation of the former community of Sloten in 1921 the city's government devised a plan to create many new houses. The plan was executed in the style of Plan Zuid, which was designed by Berlage. Only the Mercatorplein however was designed by Berlage himself. The most striking difference between Plan Zuid and Plan West is that the housing blocks built according to the latter plan contain much less decorations on their facades. Plan West consists of the following neighborhoods: Hoofddorppleinbuurt, Surinamebuurt, Admiralenbuurt and Mercatorbuurt.

== See also ==
- Urban planning
