= Amsterdamse Poort (shopping centre) =

Shopping centre in the Amsterdam borough Amsterdam Zuidoost

Coordinates: 52°18′50″N 004°57′9″E

The Amsterdamse Poort is a shopping centre in the Amsterdam borough of Zuidoost. It opened in 1987.

This shopping centre is the largest in Amsterdam. It is located near the Amsterdam Bijlmer ArenA railway station and the ArenA Boulevard (Amsterdam ArenA, Heineken Music Hall, Pathé ArenA), adjacent to the Bijlmermeer neighbourhood, noted for its multicultural population. In the shopping centre there is a location for the Tickets & Service room for the railway station. There are also 225 shops. The public spaces on the Amsterdamse Poort were designed by the Dutch landscape architects Karres en Brands.

== Gallery ==
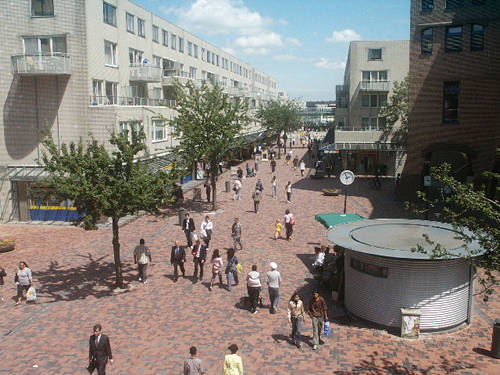

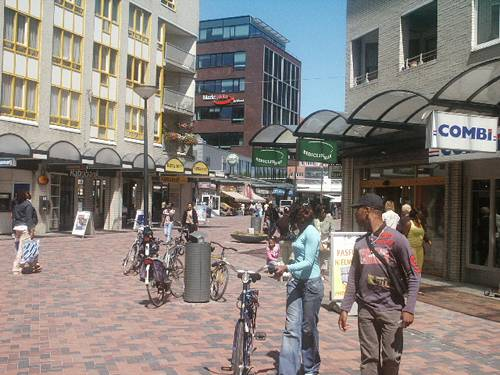

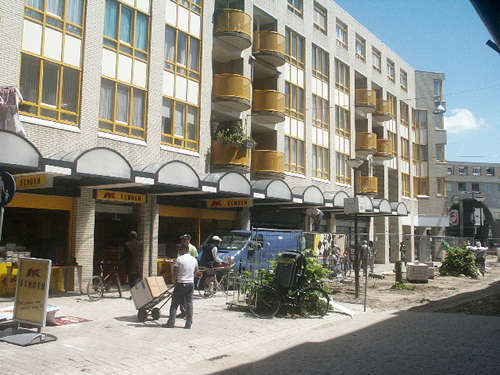

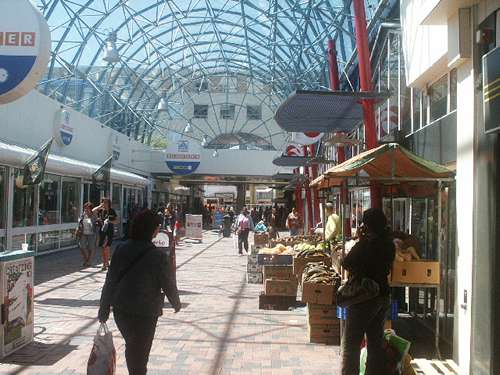

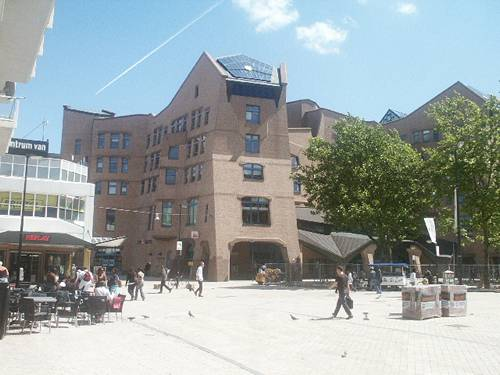

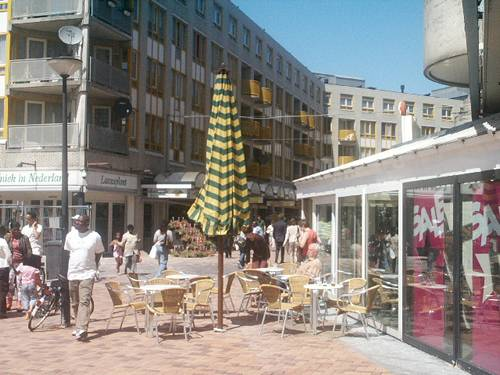

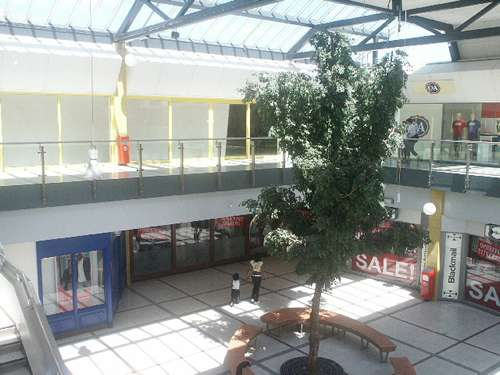

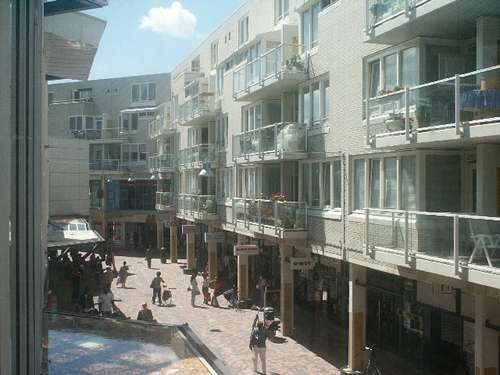
