= Symfonisch Blaasorkest ATH =

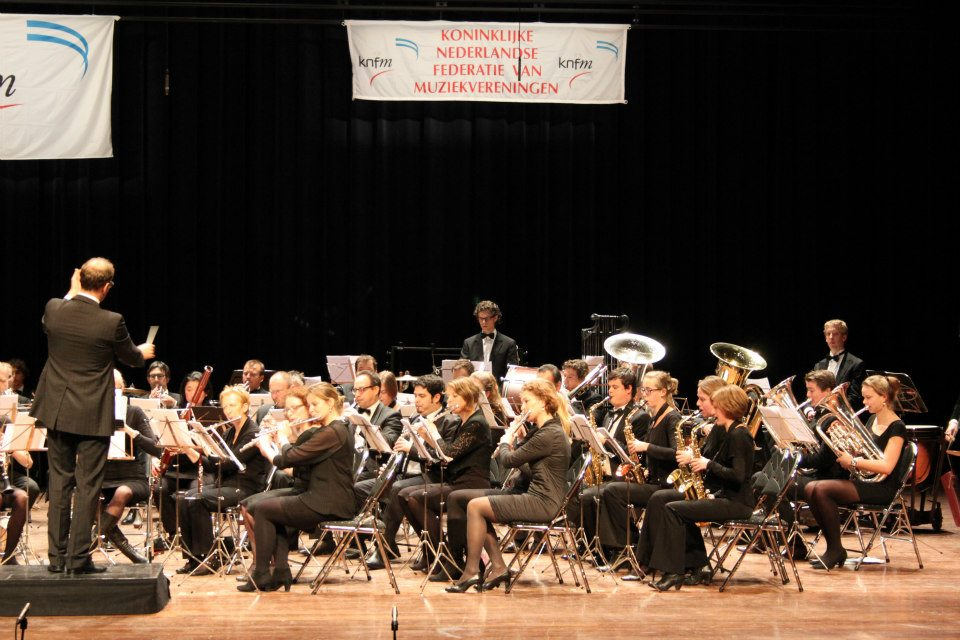
Amsterdamse Tramharmonie during the KNFM music festival 2012

Symphonic wind orchestra "Amsterdamse Tramharmonie" is a Dutch wind orchestra. Since 2012 the orchestra is conducted by Jacco Nefs.

The orchestra was founded in 1906 and plays in the First Division, the highest league of amateur orchestras in the Netherlands, and takes pride in its rich history of musical highlights. Within the past decade, under supervision of its director Gerrit de Weerd, the orchestra became one of the top amateur orchestras in the Netherlands, with excellent results at various competitions and festivals. For example, the orchestra won four consecutive ‘first prizes with honor’ (in 1995, 2000, 2005 and 2012) at the leading ‘KNFM festivals’ in the Netherlands.

The orchestra (60 members at present) is famous in and around Amsterdam and conducts several high-profile performances throughout the year.
