= Westerpark (former borough) =

Stadsdeel Westerpark
- neighborhood
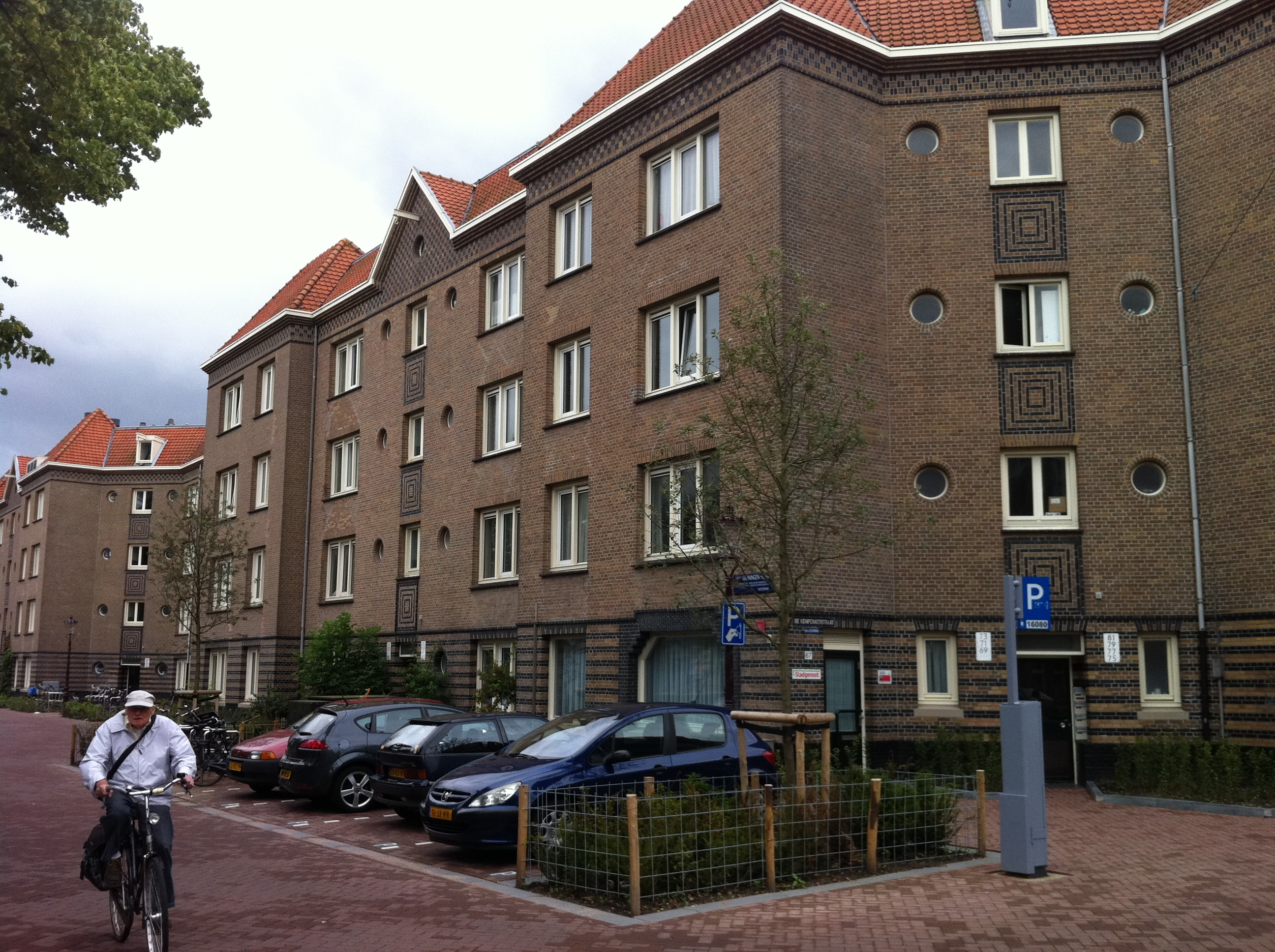
- Apartment blocks at Van Beuningenplein

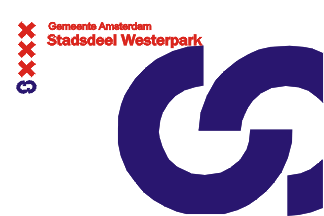
- Flag

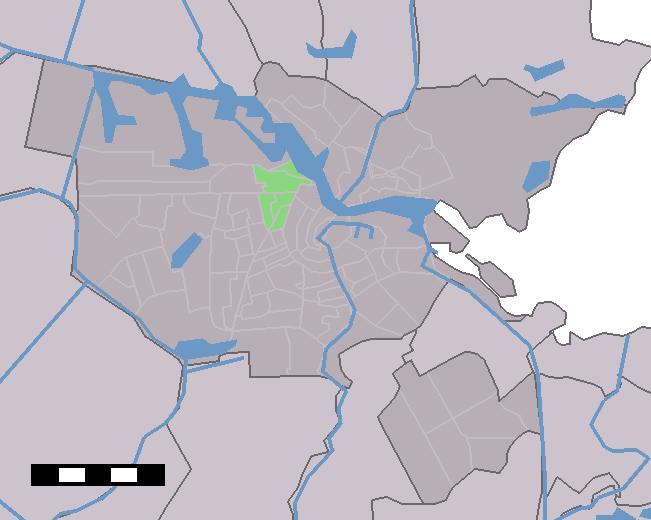
- Westerpark as part of Amsterdam
- Coordinates: 52°23′08″N 4°52′25″E
- Country: Netherlands
- Province: North Holland
- Municipality (Gemeente): Amsterdam
- Borough (Stadsdeel): West
- Time zone: UTC+1 (CET)
- Area code: 020

Westerpark is a former borough (stadsdeel) just northwest of the centre of the city of Amsterdam, Netherlands. As a borough it existed from 1990 till 2010, when it merged with the boroughs Oud-West, Bos en Lommer and De Baarsjes to form the new borough Amsterdam-West.

Westerpark comprised the following neighborhoods and areas:

- Frederik Hendrikbuurt
- Houthaven (former harbour area)
- Spaarndammerbuurt
- Staatsliedenbuurt
- Waterwijk
- Zeeheldenbuurt
- Westerpark (neighborhood) proper including the Westerpark (park)
