= Amsterdam-West =

- Borough of Amsterdam
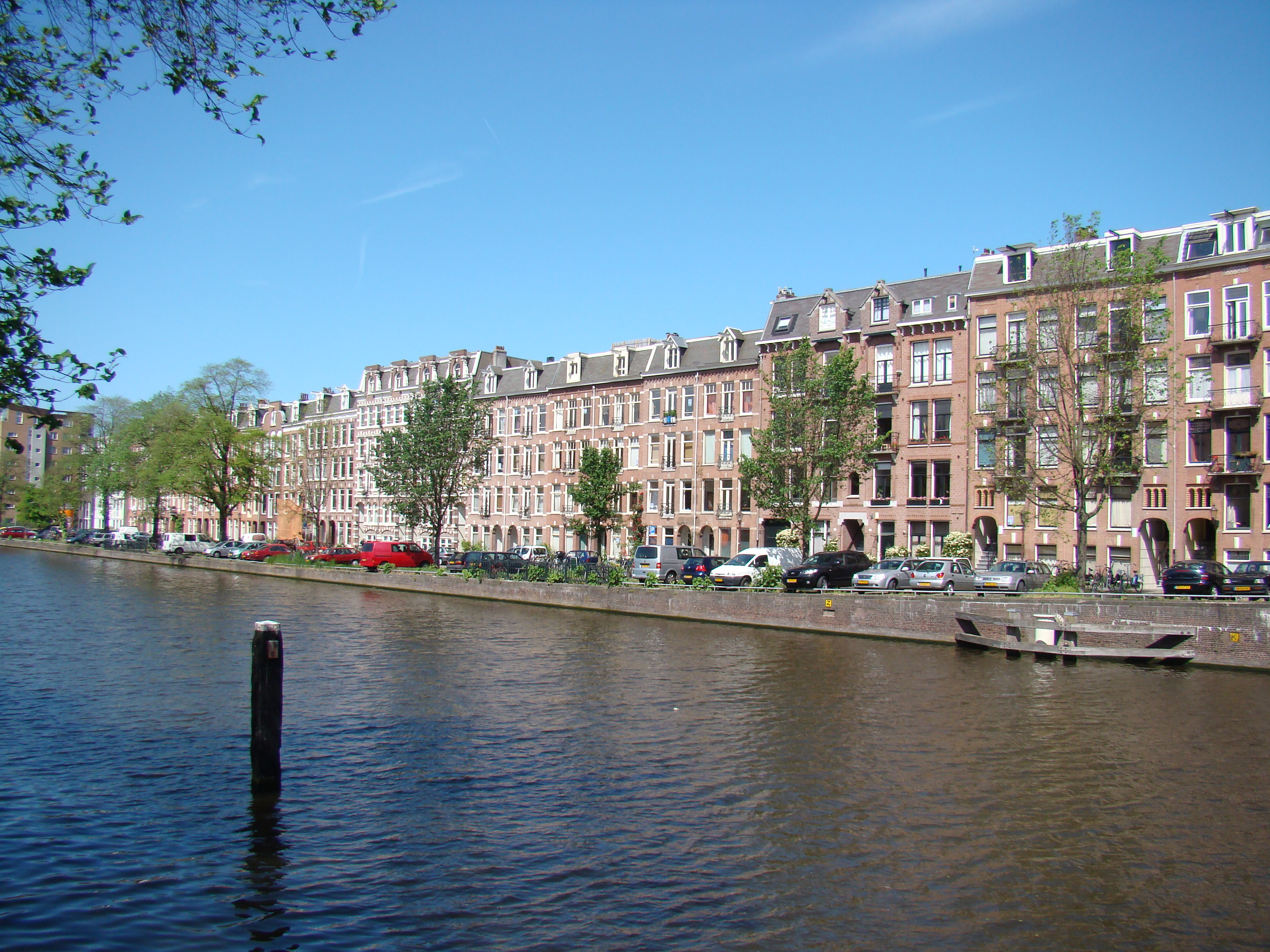
- Kattensloot in 2009

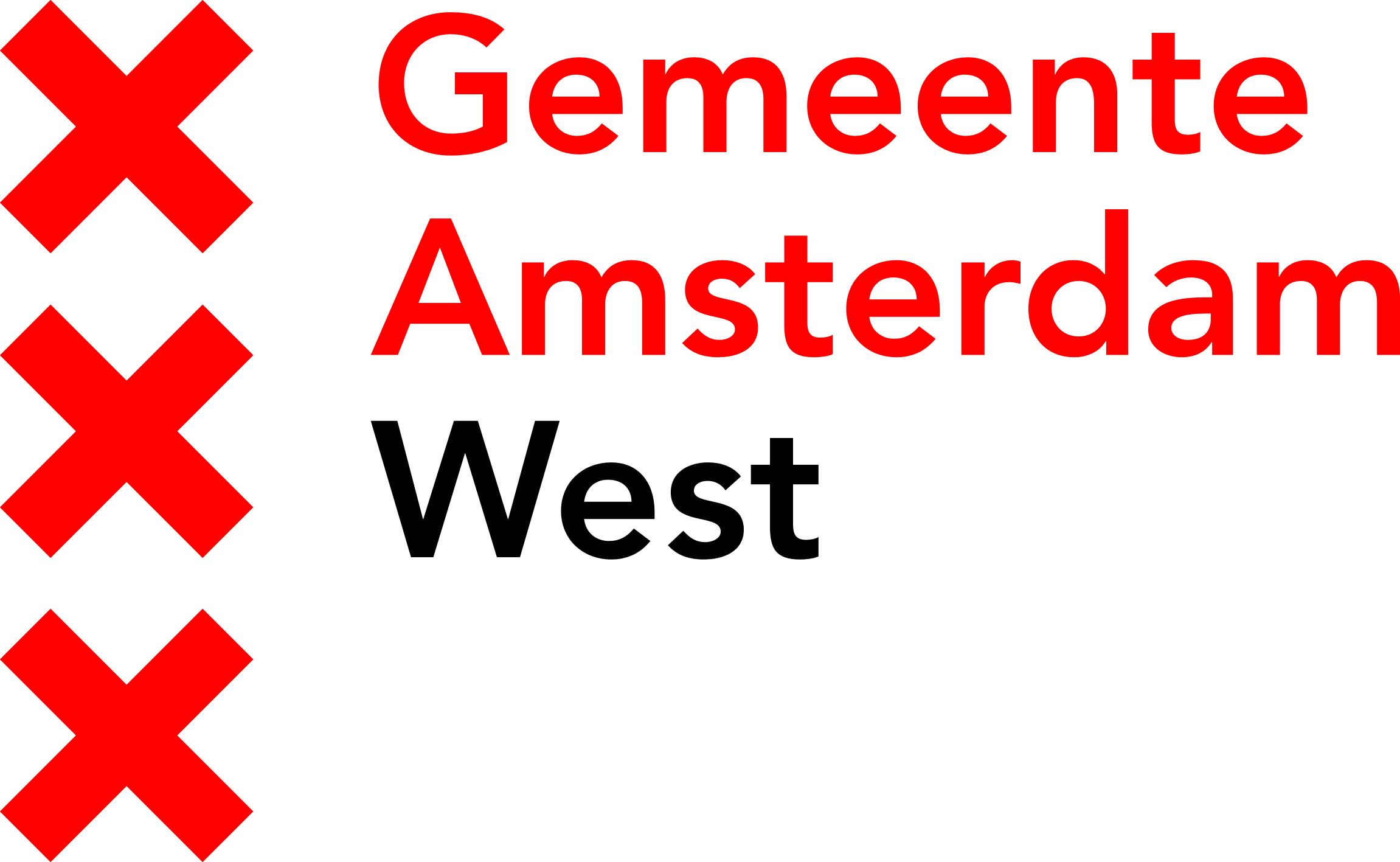
- Brandmark

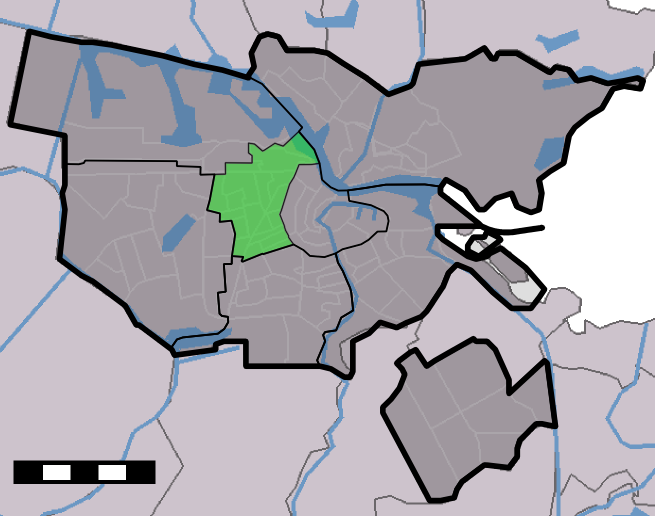
- Location in Amsterdam
- Coordinates: 52°22′30″N 4°52′00″E
- Country: Netherlands
- Province: North Holland
- Municipality: Amsterdam

Area
  - Total: 9.89 km^{2} (3.82 sq mi)

Population
  - Total: 150,374
  - Density: 15,200/km^{2} (39,400/sq mi)
- Time zone: UTC+1 (CET)
  - Summer (DST): UTC+2 (CEST)
- Website: https://www.amsterdam.nl/stadsdelen/west/

Amsterdam-West (Dutch pronunciation: [ˌɑmstərdɑɱˈʋɛst]) is a borough (Dutch: stadsdeel) of Amsterdam, Netherlands, to the west of the centre of the city. This borough was formed in 2010 through the merging of four former boroughs Oud West, Westerpark, De Baarsjes and Bos en Lommer.

This part of Amsterdam was built roughly between the end of the 19th century and 1960. In 2013, the borough had approximately 142,700 inhabitants. With about 14,000 inhabitants per km^{2}, West is also the most densely populated borough of Amsterdam.

== History ==
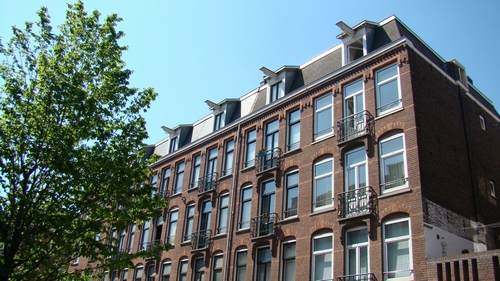
Revolutiebouw architecture, Staatsliedenbuurt

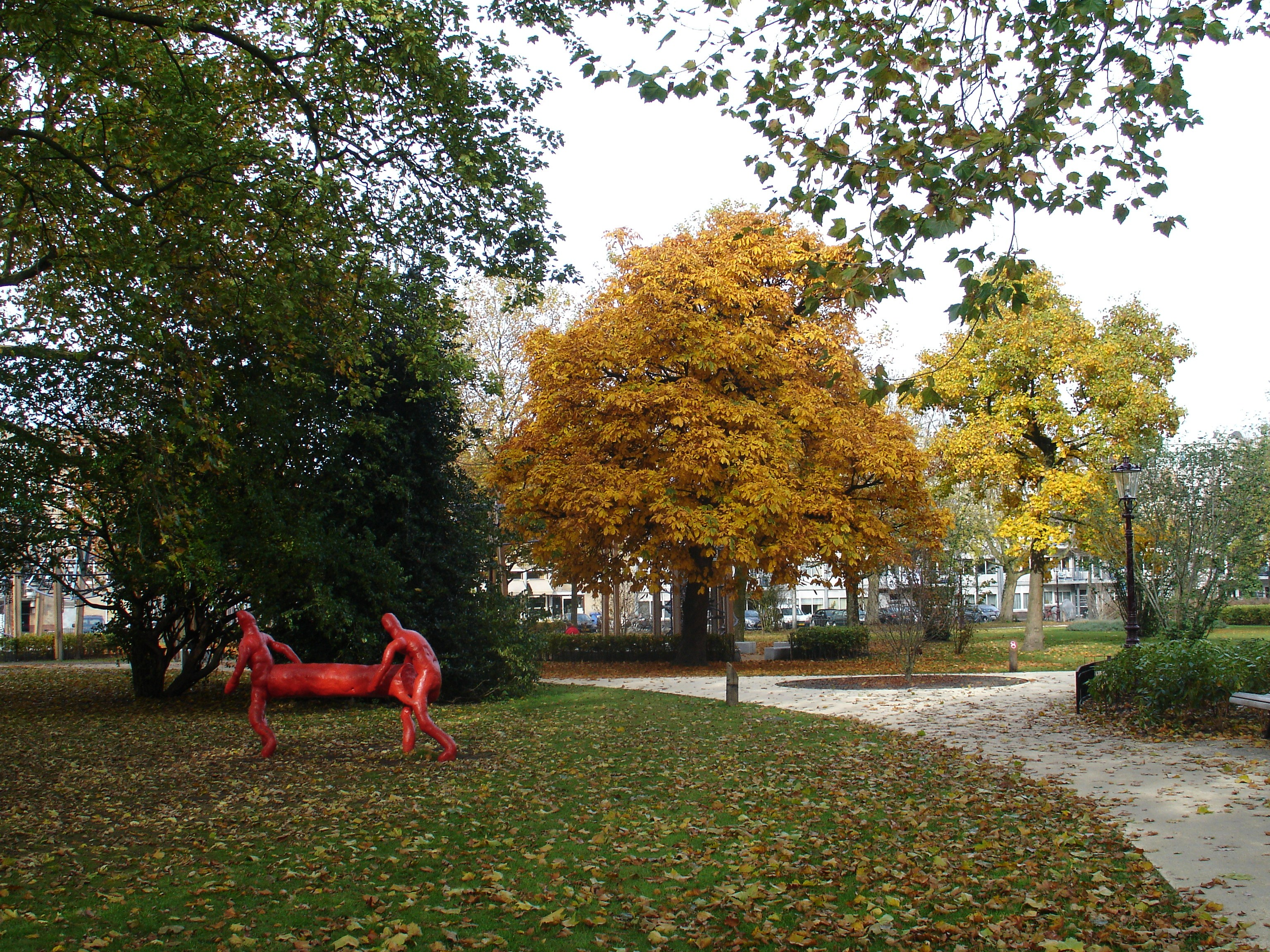
Frederik Hendrikplantsoen, Frederik Hendrikbuurt

The borough of Amsterdam-West consists primarily of the pre-World War II part of Amsterdam to the west of the Singelgracht. The western expansion beyond the 17th-century Amsterdam canal belt started in the last quarter of the 19th century. The first neighborhoods to be built were Spaarndammerbuurt, parts of Zeeheldenbuurt, Staatsliedenbuurt, Kinkerbuurt and Overtoombuurt. These neighborhoods are characterised by revolutiebouw (literally: 'revolution architecture'): quickly and cheaply constructed 19th-century apartment blocks for worker's and middle-class families once considered of substandard quality, but currently in high demand for their charming, urban outlook. Neighbouring areas constructed in the early twentieth century such as Frederik Hendrikbuurt, which borders the Frederik Hendrikplantsoen park tend to be less densely populated and are characterised by the Amsterdam School of architecture contemporary with Art Nouveau and designed to create a total architectural experience, interior and exterior. Between 1990 and 2010, these neighborhoods formed the boroughs of Westerpark and Oud-West.

Between 1920 and 1940, further urban expansion projects known as Plan West were carried out in western direction on the territory of the former municipality of Sloten. The neighborhoods around Mercatorplein and Surinameplein squares became known as De Baarsjes, which has many examples of Amsterdam School architecture. From 1990 until 2010, these neighborhoods formed the borough of De Baarsjes. The neighborhood around Hoofddorpplein square became Hoofddorppleinbuurt. In 1990, Hoofddorppleinbuurt was added to the borough of Amsterdam-Zuid.

North of these Plan West neighborhoods, the Bos en Lommer neighborhood was constructed the 1930s and 1940s. In 2007, this neighborhood was marked aandachtswijk (disadvantaged neighborhood) by minister for housing Ella Vogelaar which made national urban renewal funds and programmes available to the area. The city of Amsterdam subsequently decided to apply the same status to De Baarsjes.

== Borough government ==
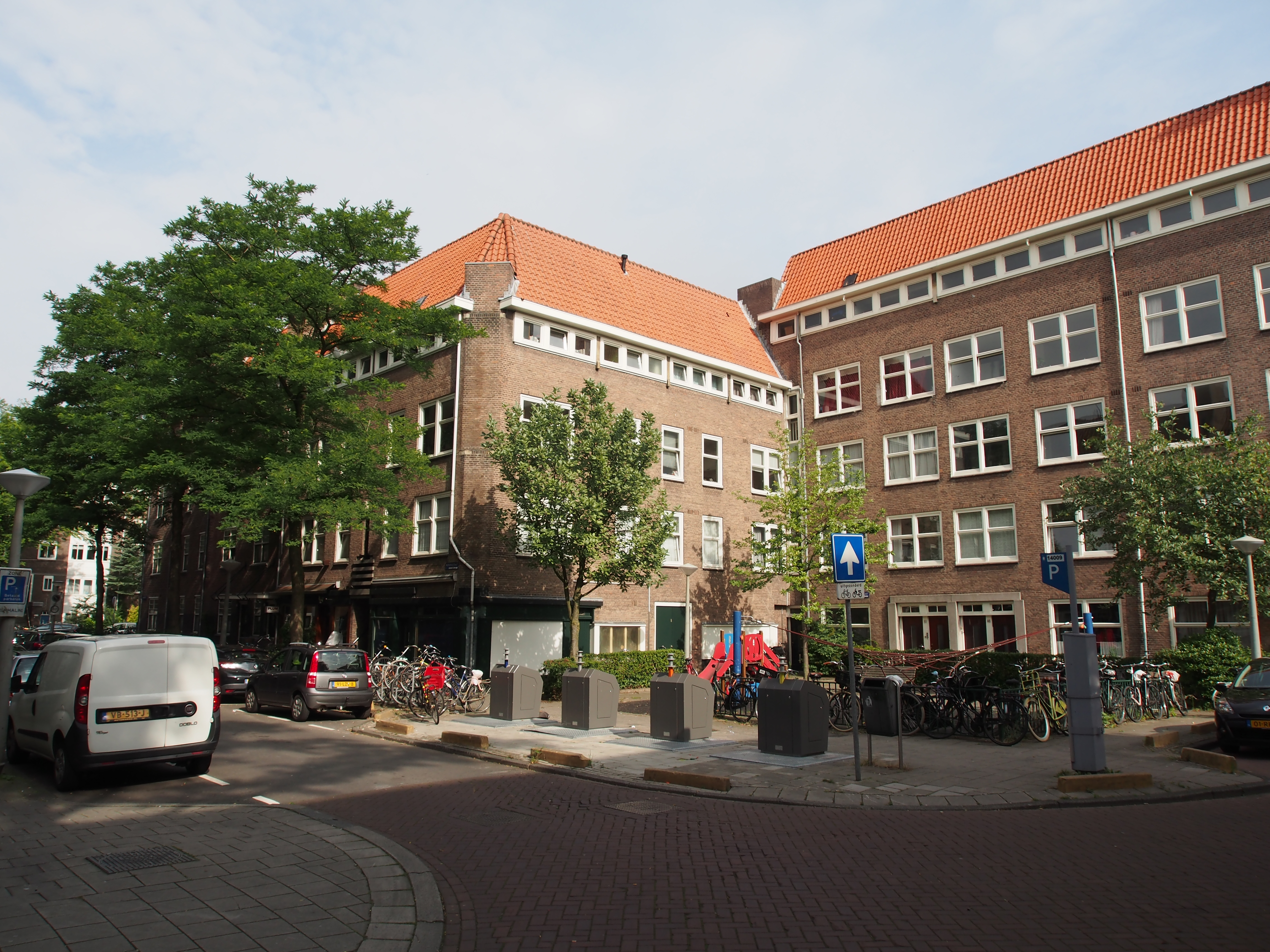
Nickeriestraat, Postjesbuurt

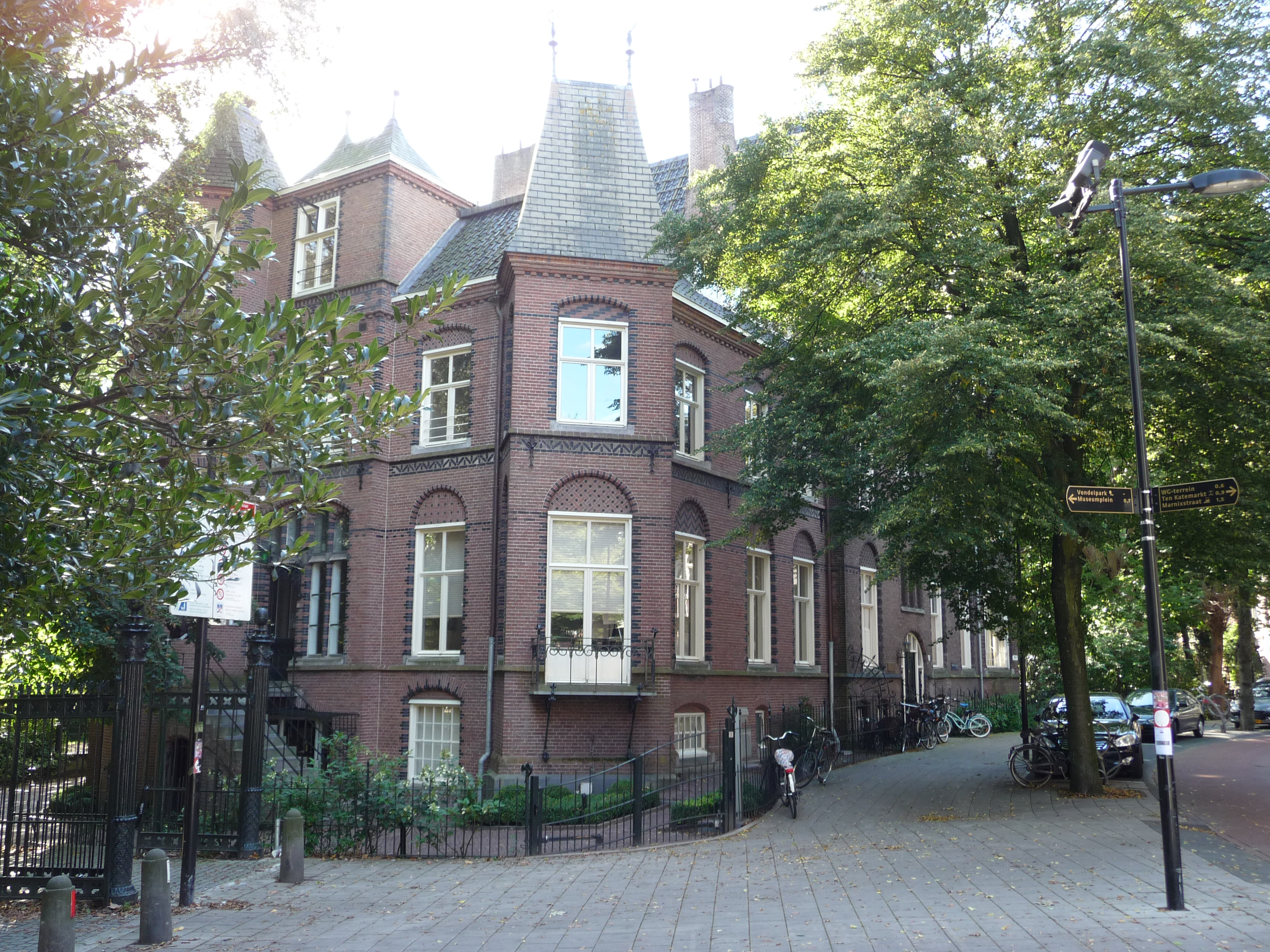
Vondelstraat, Overtoombuurt

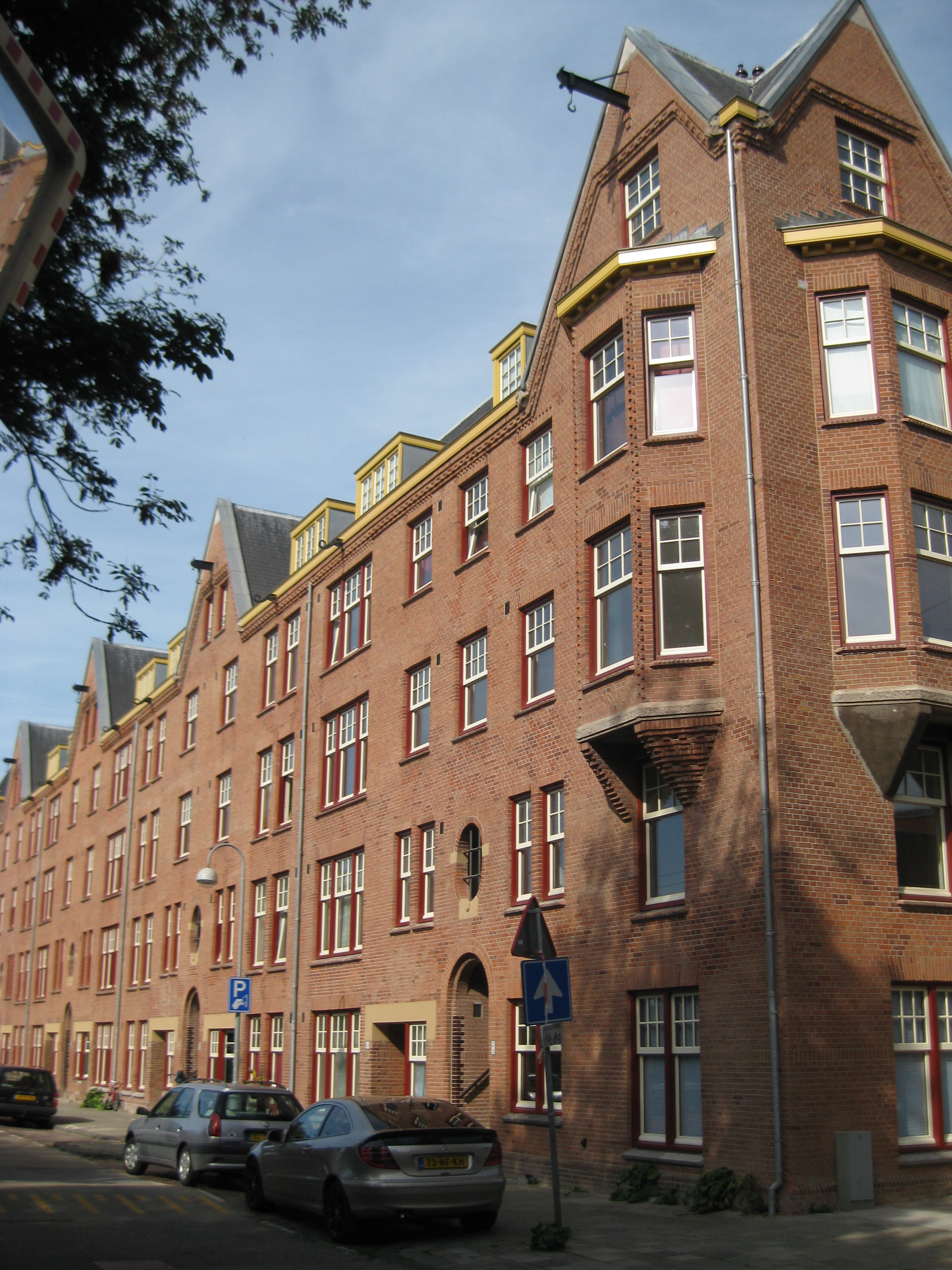
Zaanstraat, Spaarndammerbuurt

Until 2014, the Amsterdam boroughs, called stadsdelen or districts, were governed by a directly elected district council (deelraad) as well as a separate district executive board, the members of which were appointed and controlled by the council. Since the 2014 municipal elections, the district councils have been abolished and replaced by smaller, but still directly elected district committees (bestuurscommissies). The district committees are elected every four years, on the same day as the city's central municipal council. Each district committee elects three of its members to form an executive committee (dagelijks bestuur). The district committees' jurisdiction is determined by the central municipal council. Responsibilities delegated to the 2014–2018 district committees include parks and recreation, streets and squares, refuse collection, permits and events, preparation of zoning plans, passports and drivers licenses, and welfare work.

The district committee of Amsterdam-West consists of 15 members. The committee was elected on March 19, 2014. Eight political parties are represented on the committee. In April 2014, the committee elected its executive committee. Executive committee Chair is Gerolf Bouwmeester (D66), the other members are Fenna Ulichki (GL) and Jeroen van Berkel (PvdA).

District Committee West	D66	PvdA	GL	VVD	SP	PP
Dutch municipal elections, 2014	4	3	3	2	2	1

The borough offices (stadsdeelkantoor or district office) of Amsterdam-West are located at Bos en Lommerplein 250 and Baarsjesweg 224.

== Neighborhoods ==
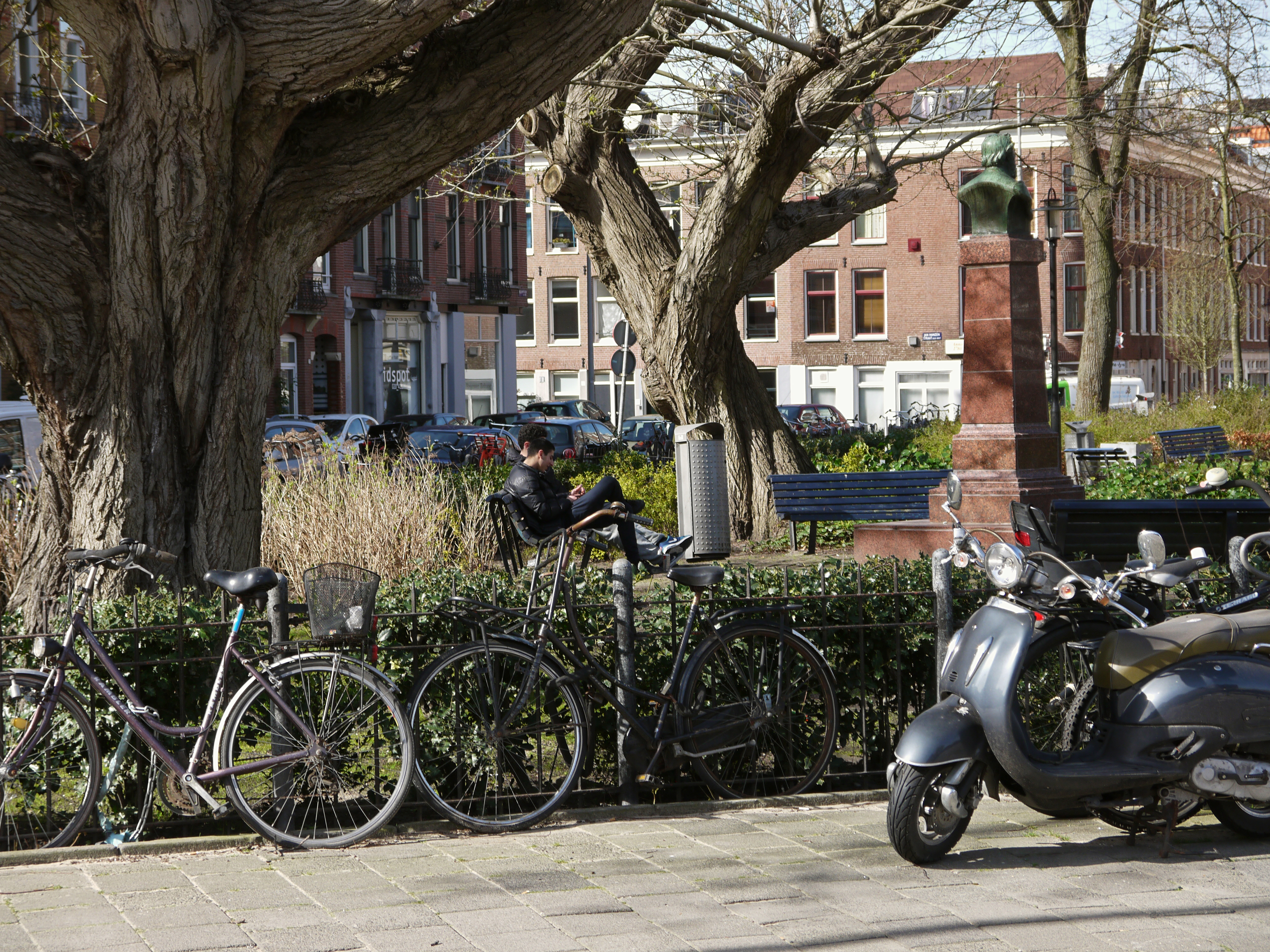
Bellamyplein, Kinkerbuurt, Oud-West

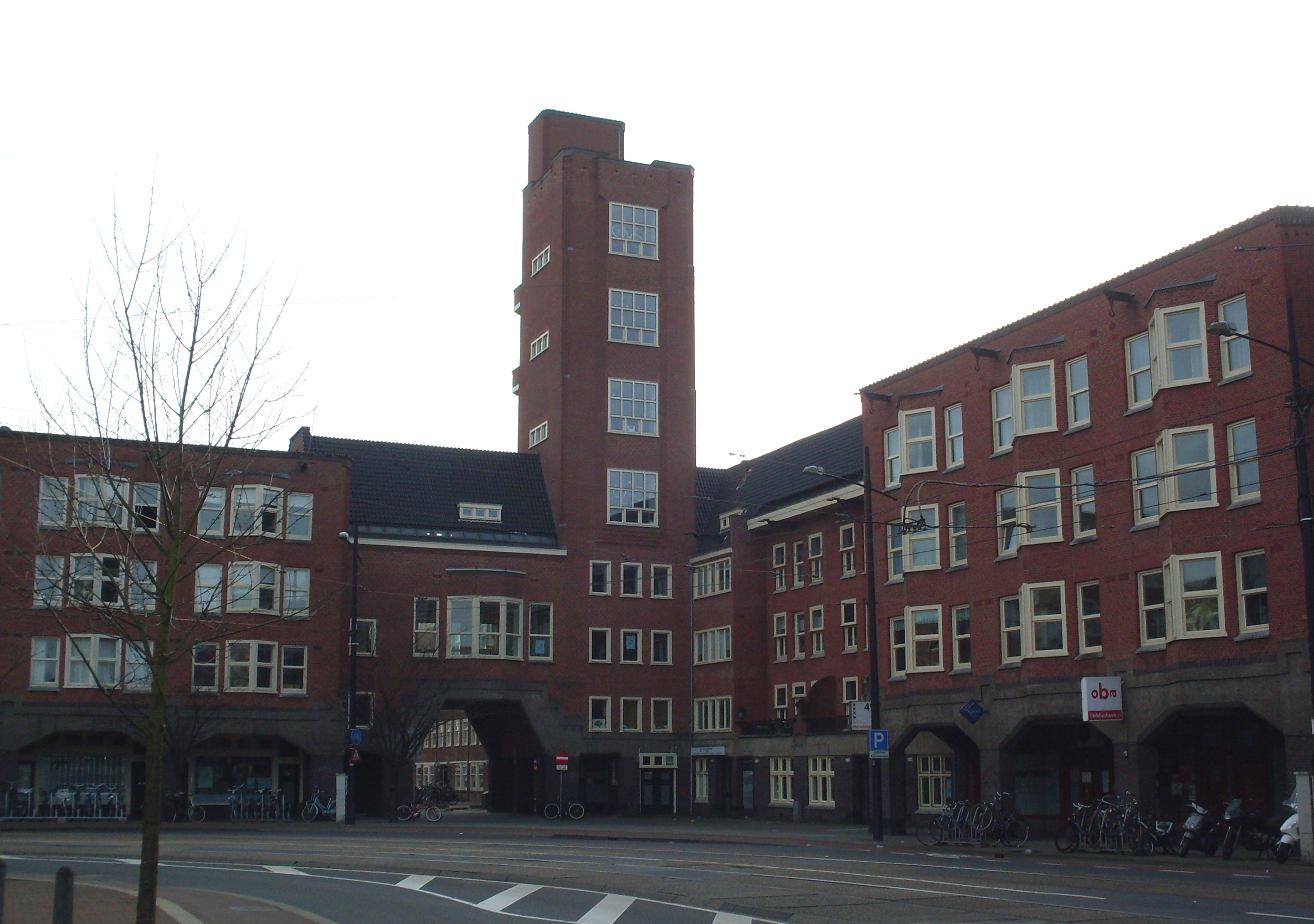
Mercatorplein, Admiralenbuurt, De Baarsjes

Amsterdam-West comprises the following neighborhoods and areas:

In the former borough of Westerpark:

- Frederik Hendrikbuurt
- Houthaven
- Spaarndammerbuurt
- Staatsliedenbuurt
- Waterwijk
- Zeeheldenbuurt
- Westerpark

In Oud-West:

- Kinkerbuurt
- Overtoombuurt

In De Baarsjes:

- Admiralenbuurt
- Chassébuurt
- Postjesbuurt
- Trompbuurt

In the former borough of Bos en Lommer:

- Bos en Lommer
- Kolenkitbuurt
- Landlust
- Sloterdijk (village)
