= Westerpark (disambiguation) =

Westerpark is a park in Amsterdam, Netherlands.

Westerpark may also refer to:

- Westerpark (neighbourhood), a neighbourhood in Amsterdam, Netherlands
- Westerpark (former borough), a former borough in Amsterdam, Netherlands
- Westerpark (Breda), a neighbourhood in Breda, Netherlands
