= Westerpark (neighbourhood) =

- Neighborhood of Amsterdam
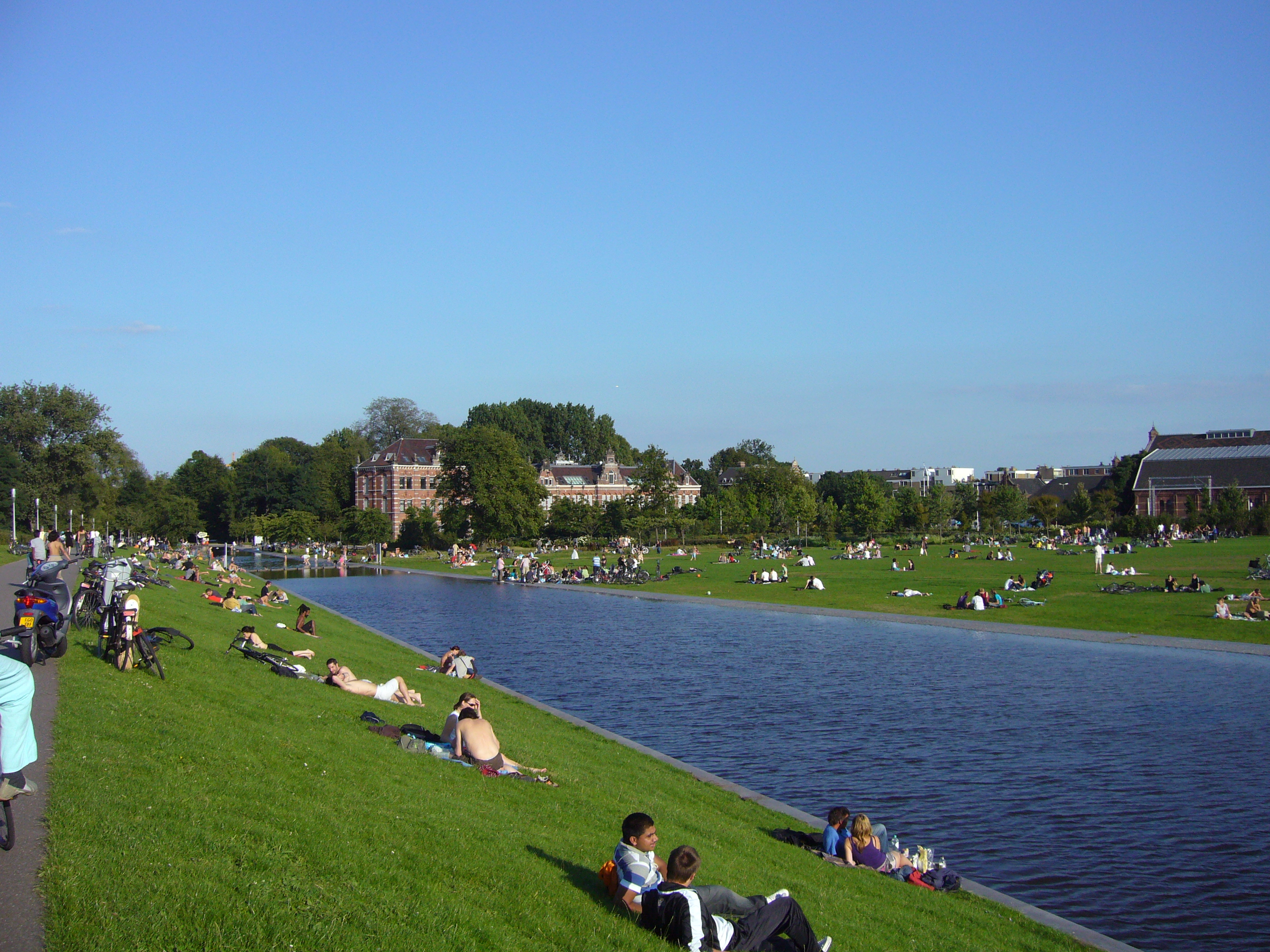
- Westerpark, namesake of the neighbourhood
- Interactive map of Westerpark
- Coordinates: 52.3862°N 4.8746°E
- Country: Netherlands
- Province: North Holland
- COROP: Amsterdam
- Borough: West
- Time zone: CET (UTC+01)
  - Summer (DST): CEST (UTC+02)

Westerpark is a neighbourhood of Amsterdam, Netherlands. It is bordered by the Staatsliedenbuurt on the south and the Spaarndammerbuurt on the northeast and Sloterdijk area of Westpoort on the west. It is a non-residential area, containing the park by the same name, the Westergasfabriek (former gas factory turned into a cultural center), the Sint-Barbara cemetery, and railyards.

Westerpark is also a former borough of the city, which was merged with into the borough of Amsterdam-West.
