= Houthaven =

Coordinates: 52°23′50″N 4°52′55″E

- Neighbourhood of Amsterdam
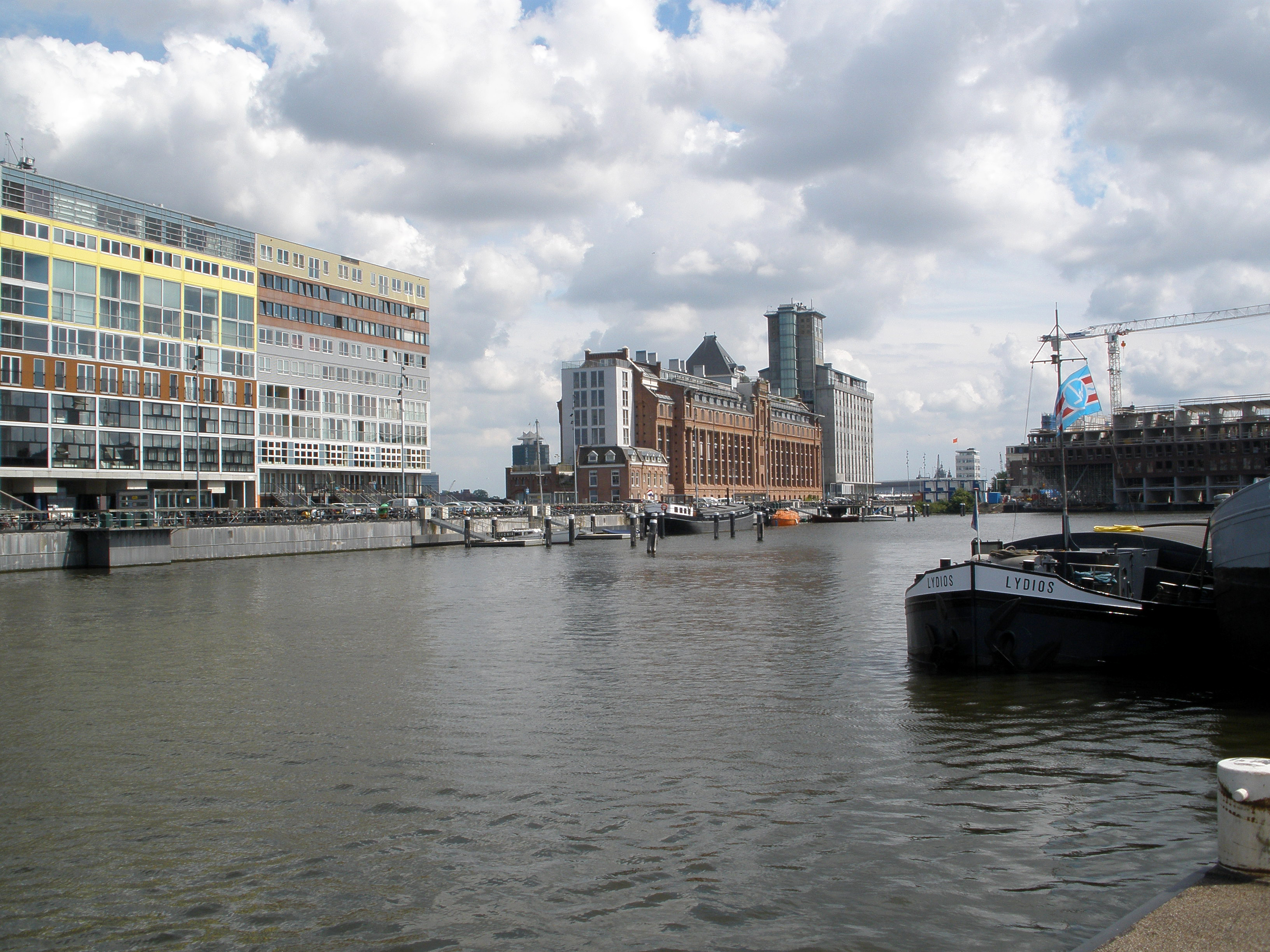
- A view of Oude Houthaven
- Interactive map of Houthaven
- Country: Netherlands
- Province: North Holland
- Municipality: Amsterdam
- Borough: West
- Time zone: UTC+1 (CET)

Houthaven is a neighbourhood of Amsterdam, Netherlands situated in the West borough. Literally meaning "lumber port", Houthaven is a port situated along the IJ in Amsterdam's western port. It is bordered by a dam in the IJ river to the north and the Spaarndammerbuurt in the south. It is currently predominantly used by inland barges, however plans are in motion to radically change the area in the next few years by building a new residential area on seven artificial islands.

The harbour is made up out of four parts (from east to west): Oude Houthaven (Old Lumber Port), Houthaven, Nieuwe Houthaven (New Lumber Port) and Minervahaven (Minerva Port). This is why the Houthaven is also referred to as the Houthavens (which is the plural).

== History ==
The Houthaven was dug out in 1876, together with the North Sea Canal. It was the first port in Amsterdam to be dug out (the earlier ones using existing waters). Its purpose was to tranship and store lumber. As lumber was increasingly transported by road, parts of the port were filled up with sand to be used for other purposes in 1945. The Minervahaven remained in use for lumber transhipment and wood processing industry was located there but port-related activities decreased strongly over time. The area is currently being redeveloped.

== Canals ==
Eight new canals were dug in the new residential area since 2018. The names are largely based on places along the Baltic Sea that used to have much maritime trade with Amsterdam. In 2021, they were given the following names:

- Gevlewater
- Lübeckgracht
- Stralsundgracht
- Koningsbergengracht
- Kolberggracht
- Pernaugracht
- Wismargracht
- Houthavengracht

== Public transport ==
The Houthaven can be reached from the city centre via bus line 48, which has its terminus in the district at the Koivistokade. On the edge of the district, bus line 22 has a stop at the Spaarndammerstraat.

== Gallery ==
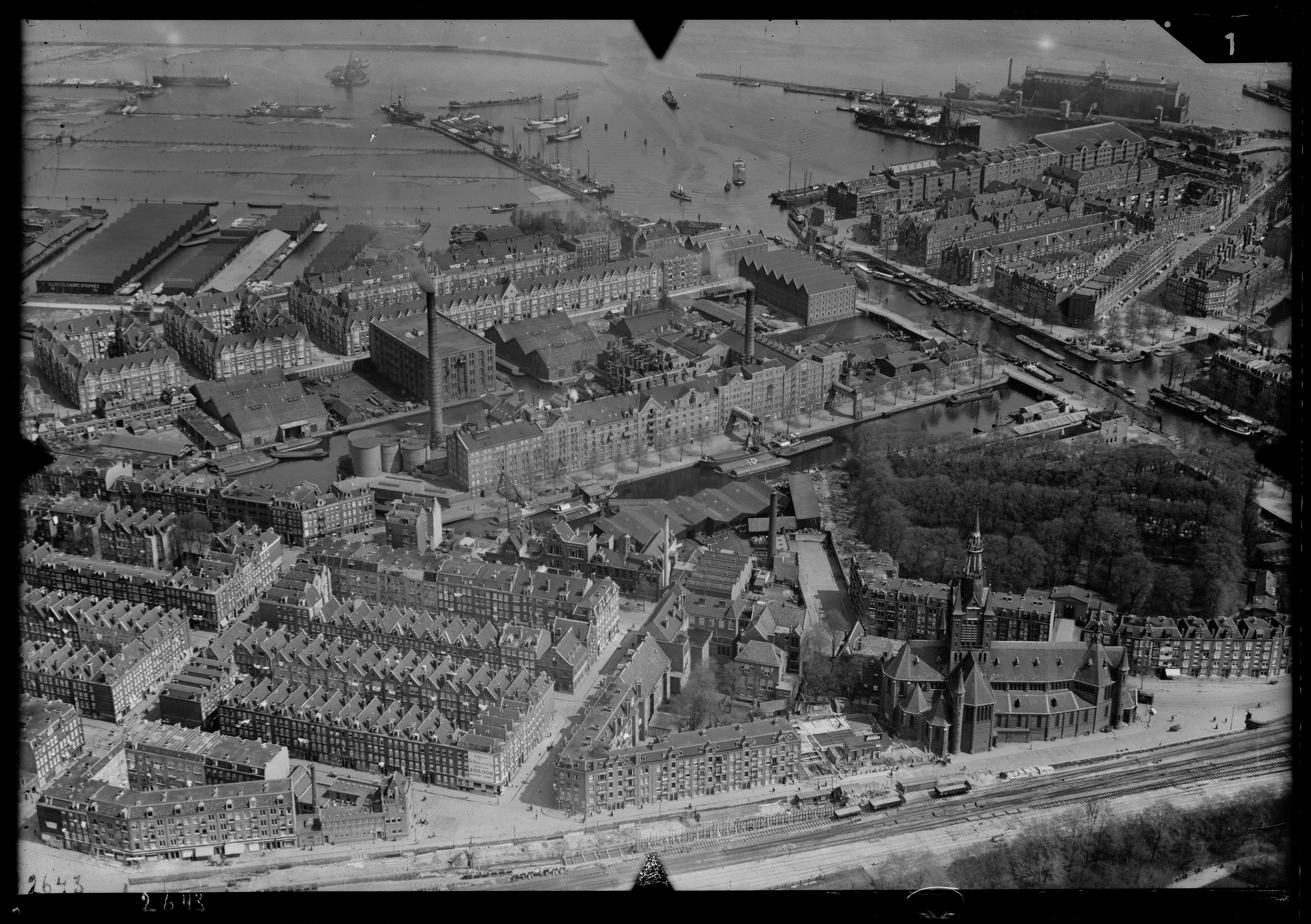
Aerial view of the Spaarndammerbuurt, Zeeheldenbuurt and the Oude Houthaven in the background (around 1930)

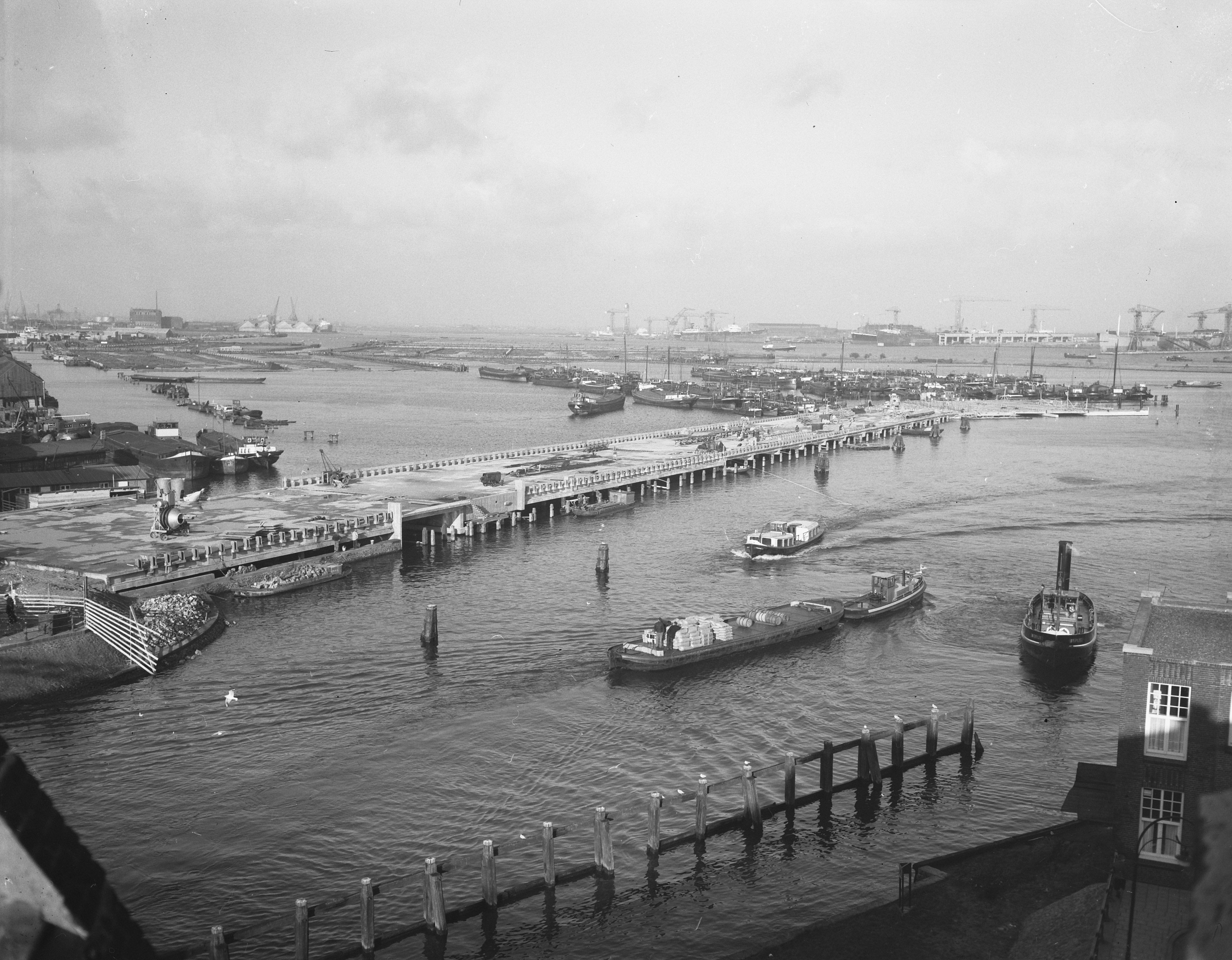
The Pontsteiger under construction, in the background the Houthaven with floating beams (16 January 1956)

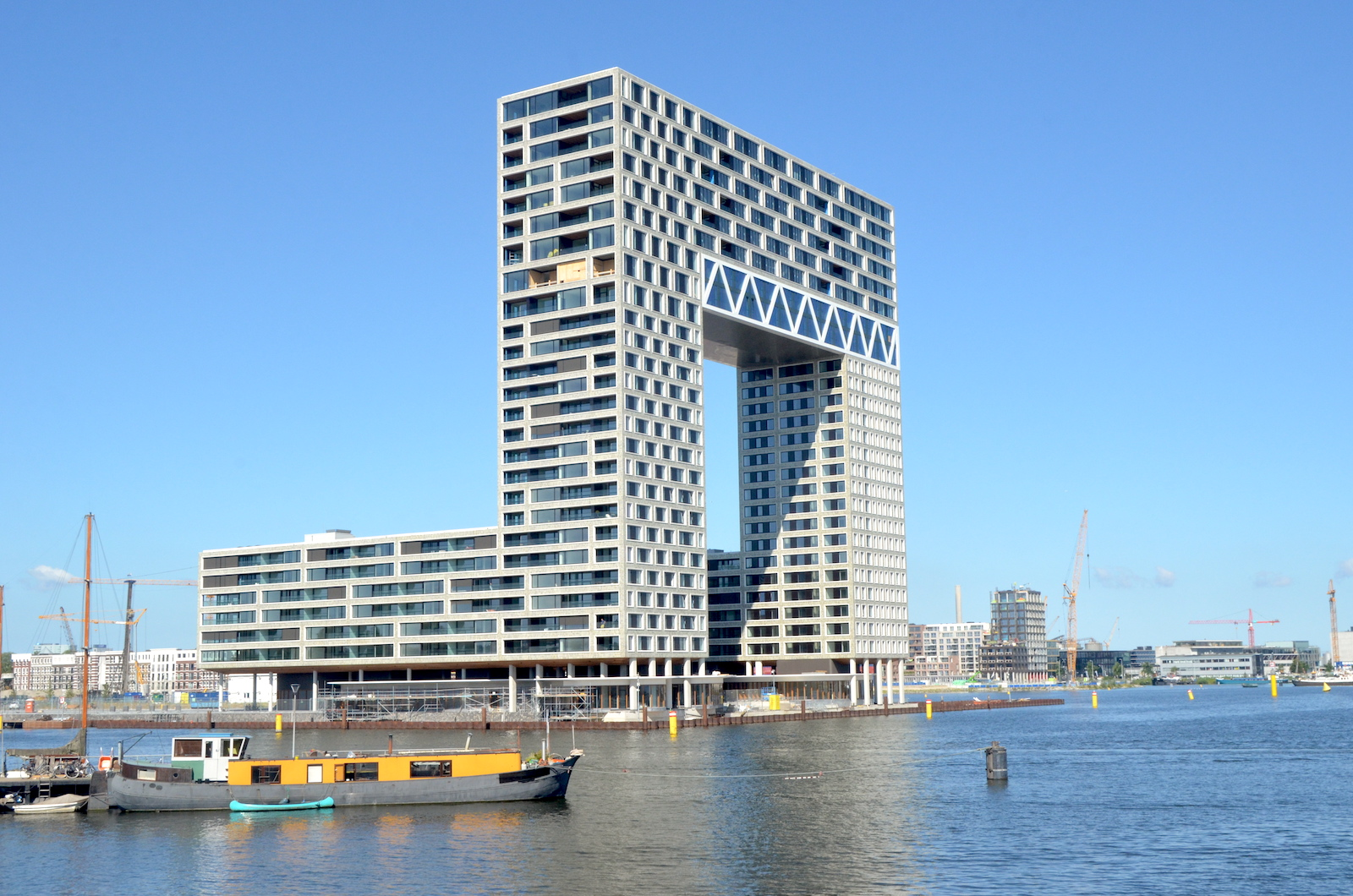
The Pontsteiger Building, shortly after completion in July 2018.

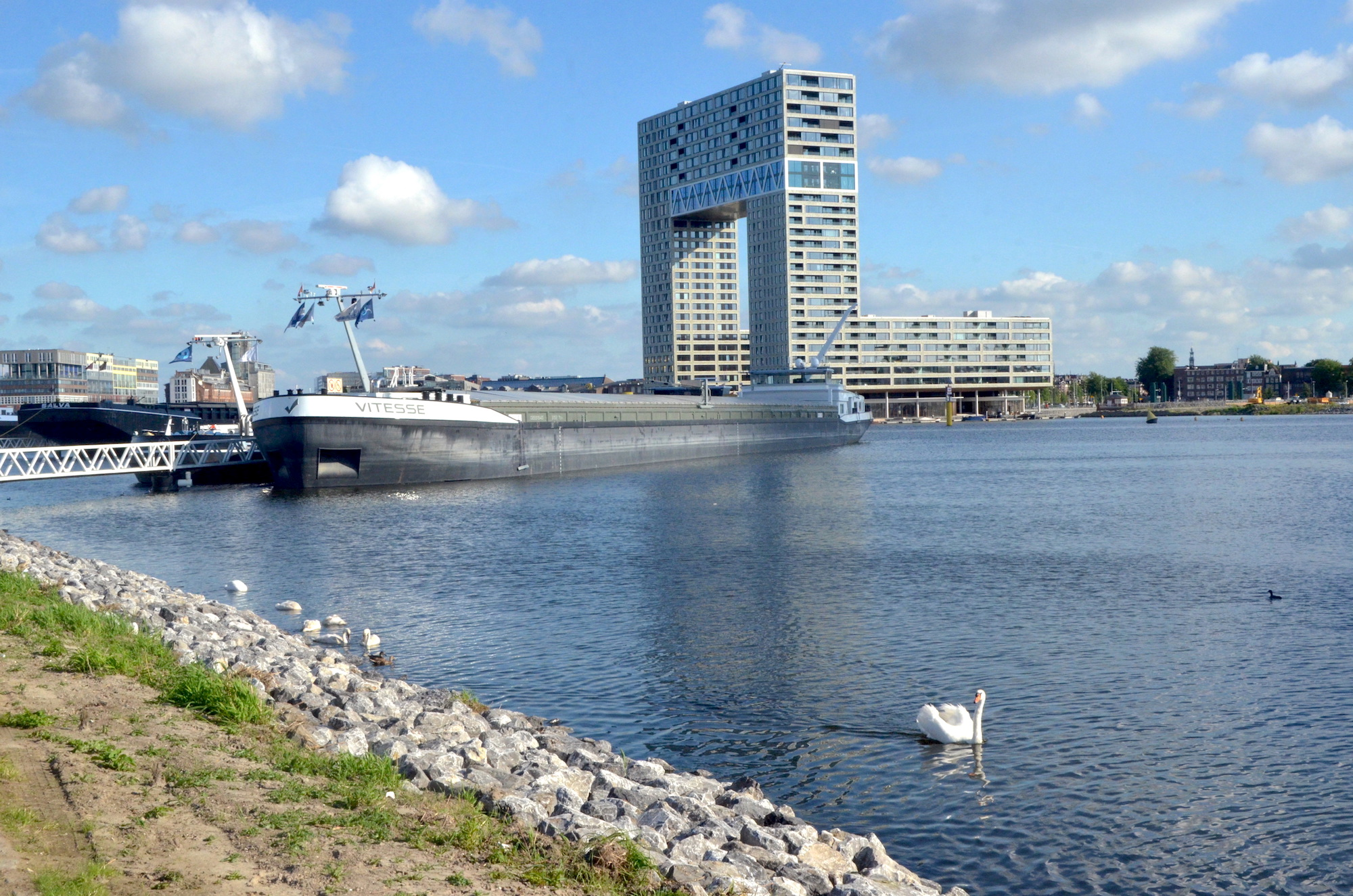
The Pontsteiger building, seen from the northwest (July 24, 2020)

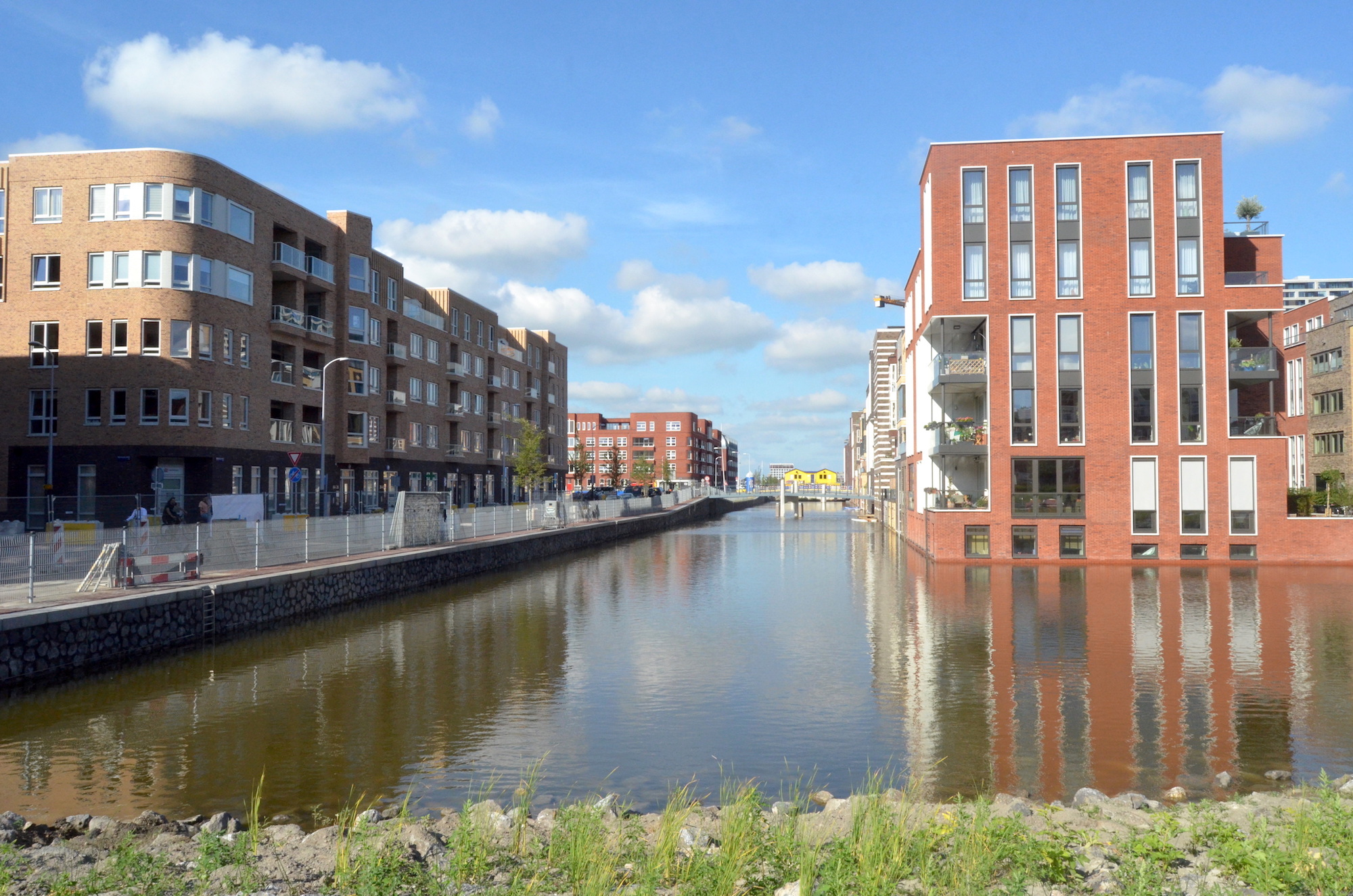
Reval Island and Narva Island (July 24, 2020)

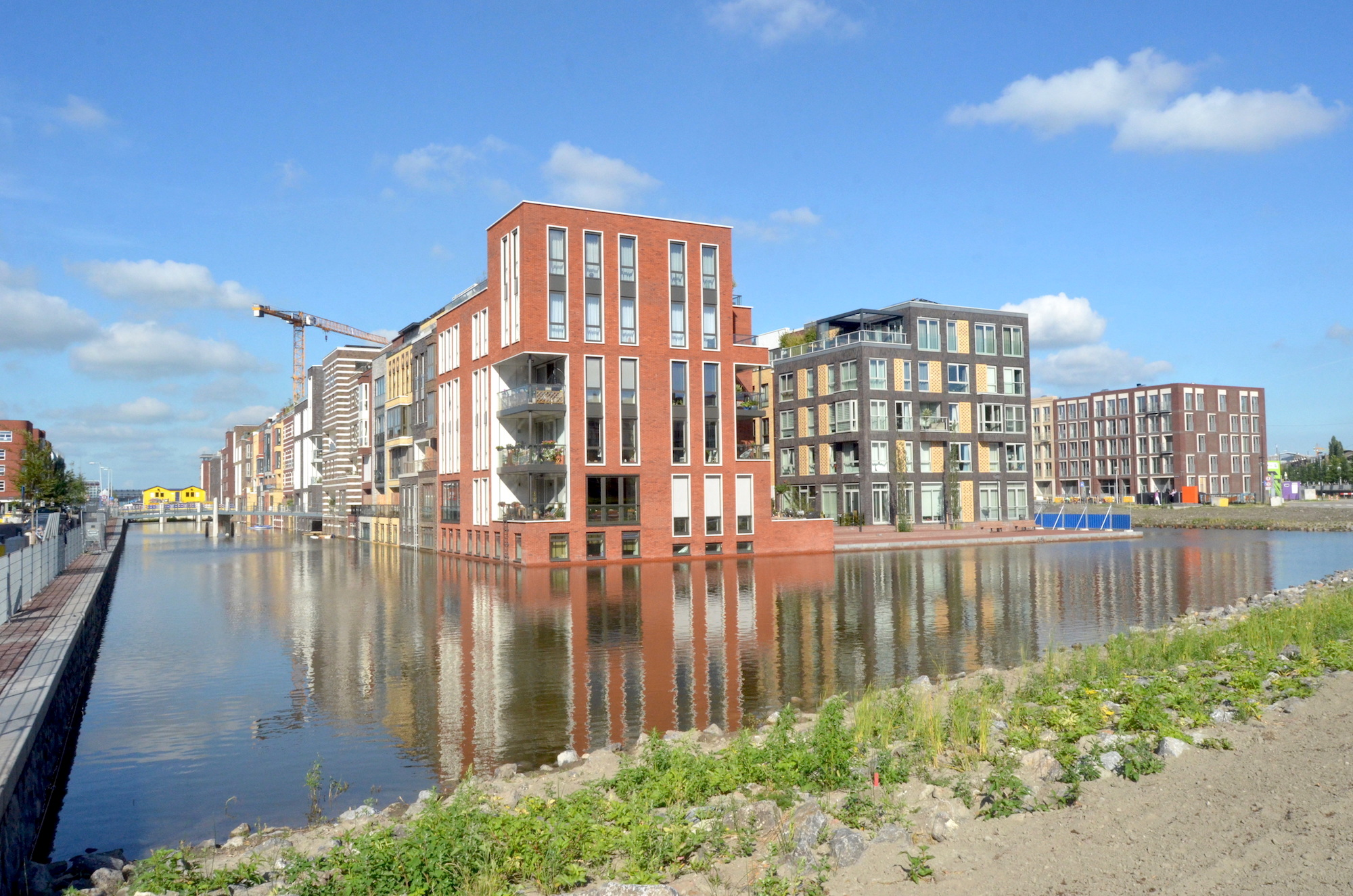
Narva Island and Memel Island (July 24, 2020)

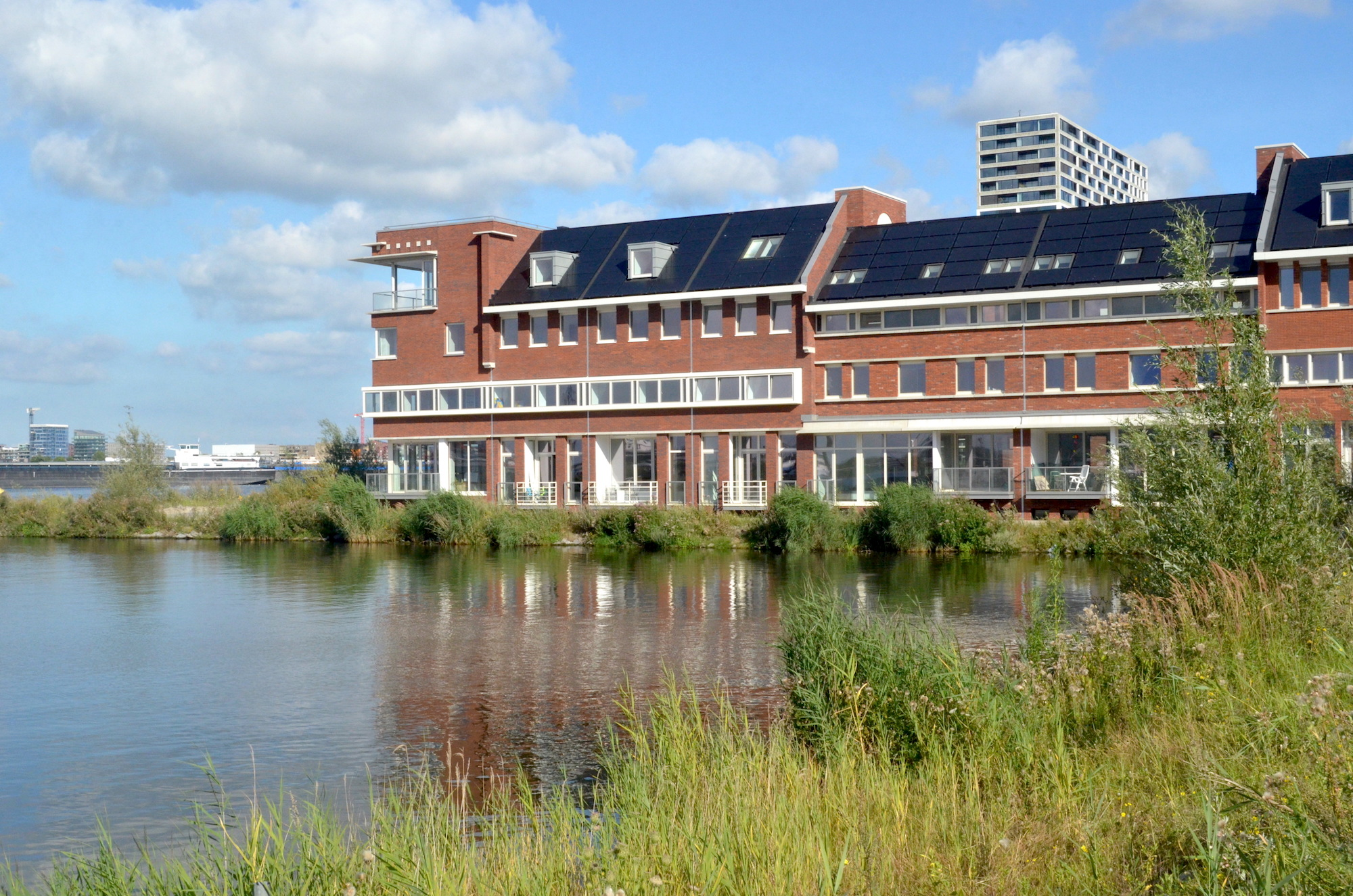
Stettin Island (24 July 2020)

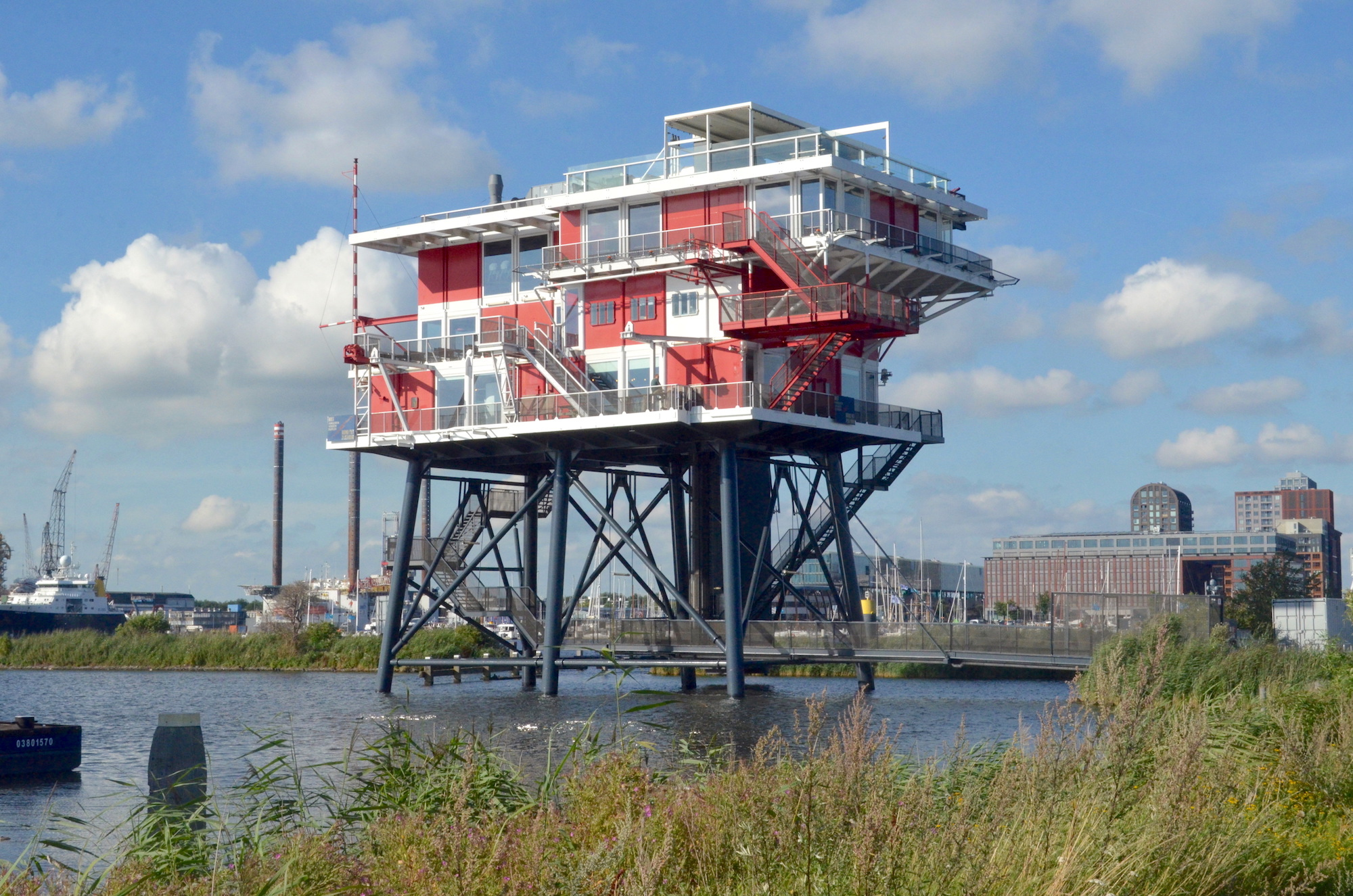
REM Island (July 24, 2020)

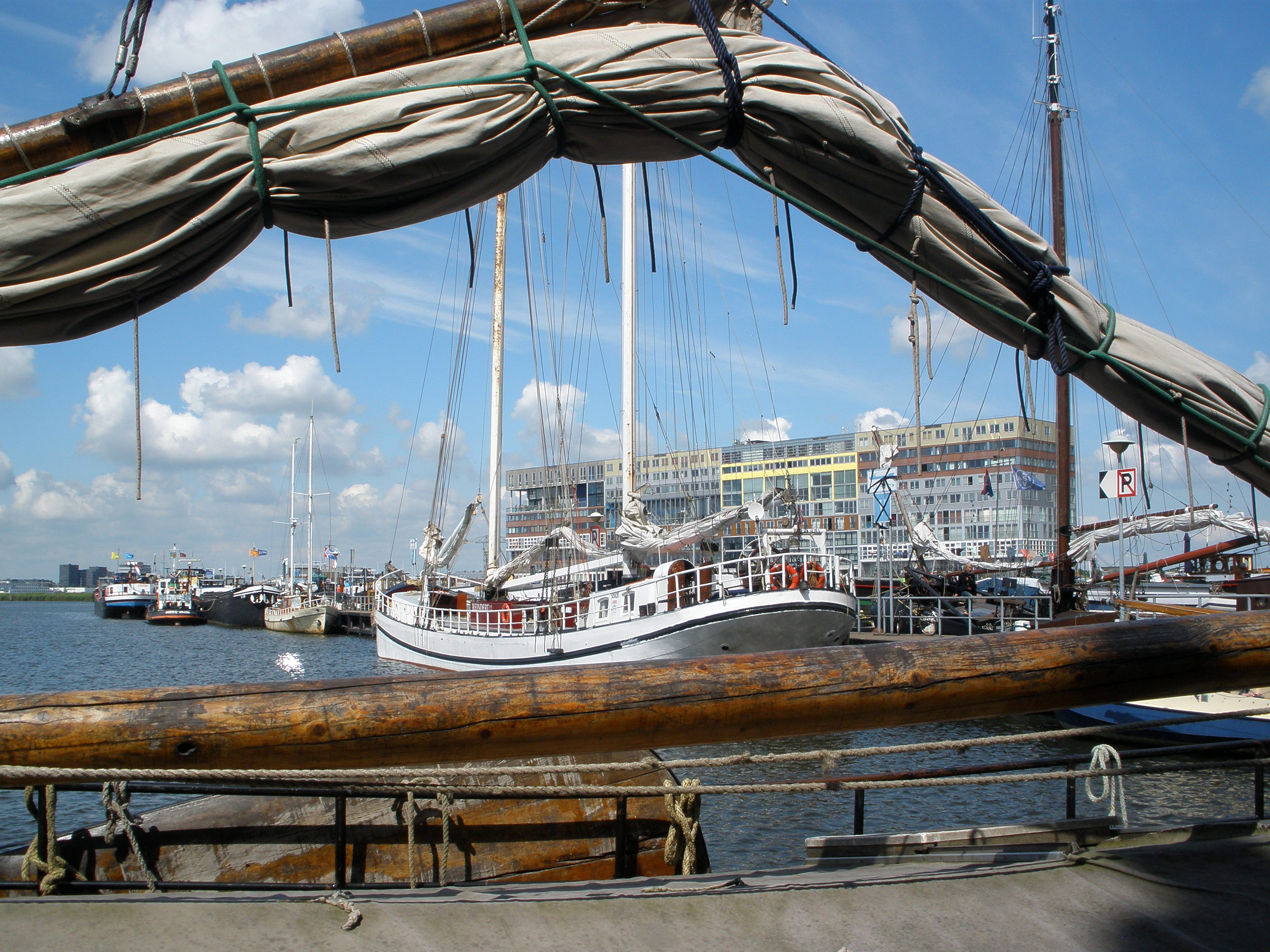
Sailing ships in the Old Houthaven (June 14, 2008)

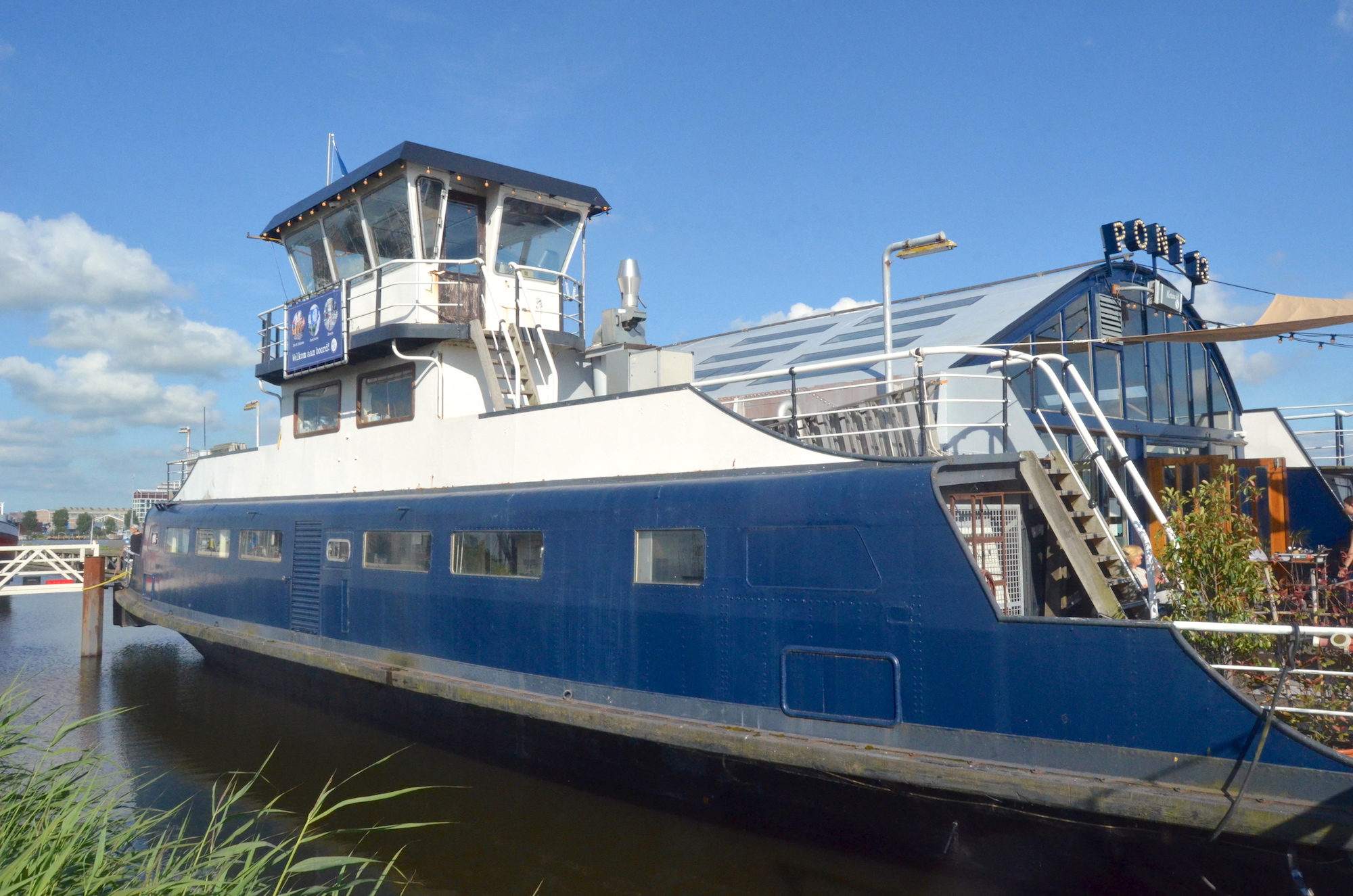
Restaurant Pont 13, the former GVB ferry 13

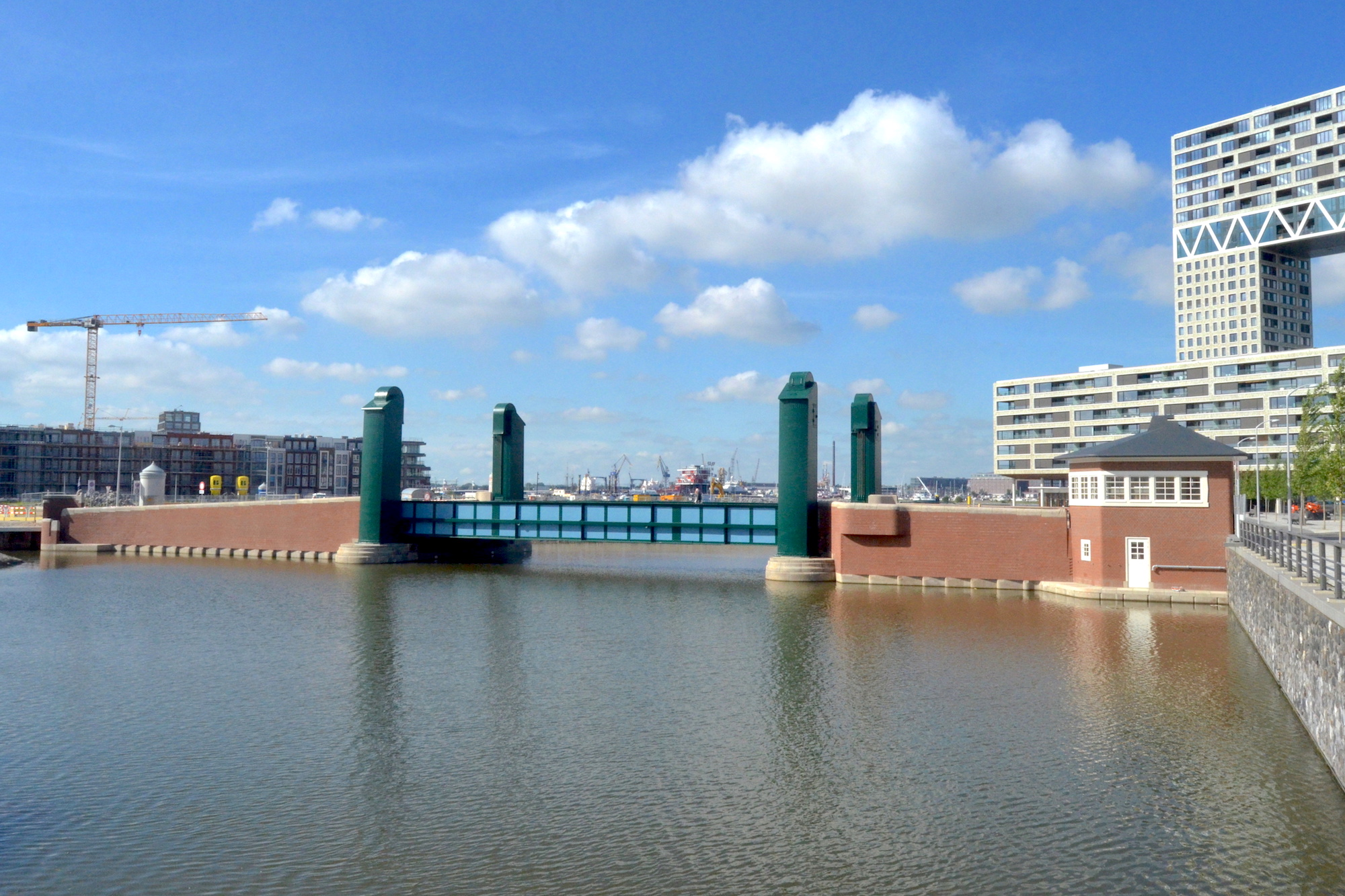
The Gevlebrug (bridge 2430), near the Pontsteigergebouw (July 24, 2020)

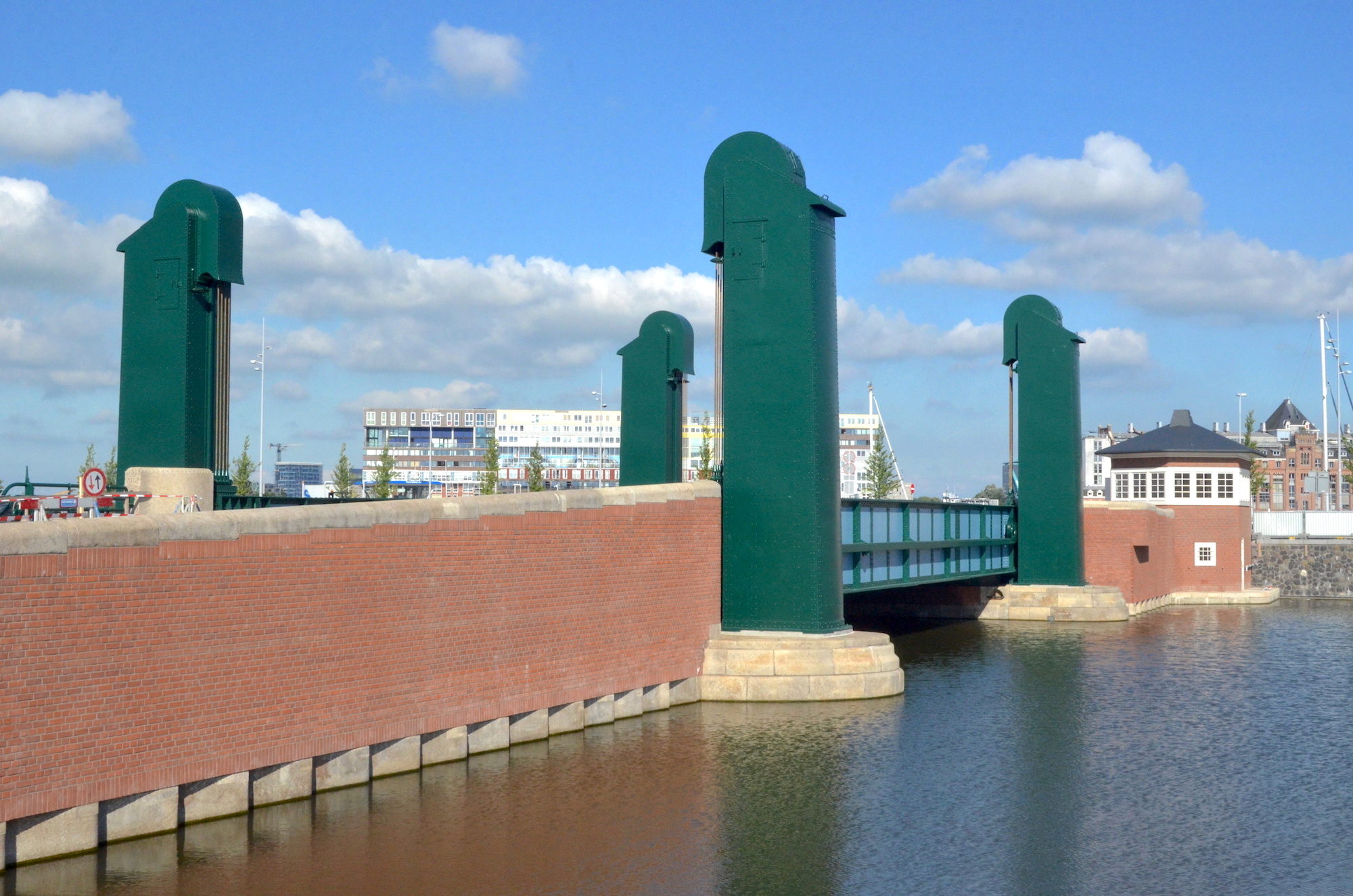
The Gevlebrug (bridge 2430) is a bascule bridge designed by Piet Kramer in 1930 (July 24, 2020)
