= Sloterdijk, Amsterdam =

Former village in North Holland, Netherlands

Sloterdijk
- Village
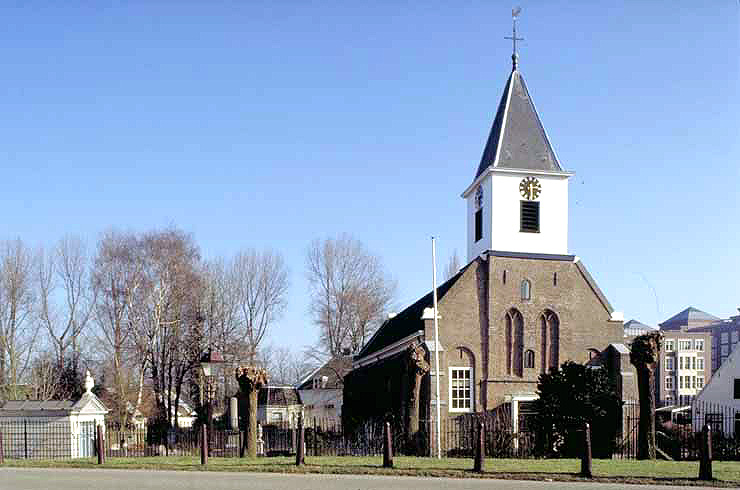
- Petruskerk

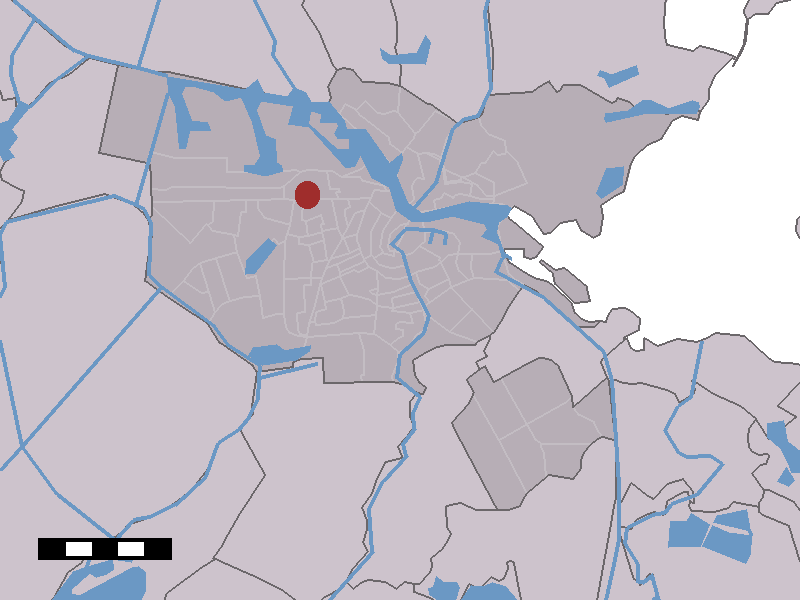
- Sloterdijk in the municipality of Amsterdam.
- Coordinates: 52°23′N 4°51′E
- Country: Netherlands
- Province: North Holland
- Municipality: Amsterdam
- Time zone: UTC+1 (CET)
  - Summer (DST): UTC+2 (CEST)

Sloterdijk (Dutch: [ˌsloː.tərˈdɛi̯k]) was a village in the Dutch province of North Holland. It now is a part of the municipality of Amsterdam, and lies about 3 km northwest of the city centre. Since 2010 Sloterdijk has formed part of the stadsdeel of Amsterdam-West.

Nearby is the site of Amsterdam Sloterdijk railway station.

== Early history ==
To protect the area around Sloten from the as-yet undrained IJ the Spaarndammerdijk was laid along the south bank of this inlet. In this vicinity at the same time, a dam on the Slochter (or Slooter) river was built, the Slooterdam. Trade grew in the vicinity, and in 1465 a weigh house (or waag) was established. A church was built in about 1479; however, it was destroyed in 1573 by the Geuzen, a group of nobles rebelling against Spanish control of Holland, following the siege of Haarlem. In the 17th century the Petruskerk (St. Peter’s Church) was built, which stands to this day.

== Rail and tram lines ==
The construction of the Haarlemmertrekvaart in 1631 brought new prosperity to the village, and a toll was placed along the towpath.

Industry grew around Sloterdijk in the 19th century. On 20 September 1839, the first train to operate in The Netherlands traveled from Sloterdijk to Haarlem. The new rail line between Amsterdam and Haarlem ran parallel to the Haarlemmertrekvaart, but for half a century the line passed through without stopping.

From 1882, steam-powered tram, and later horse-drawn trams ran to Amsterdam along the Haarlemmerweg. This was the last horse-tram in Amsterdam, and it was electrified in 1916. An electric tram from Amsterdam to Haarlem and Zandvoort ran from 1904 to 1957.

== New stations and new growth ==
The construction of the new Sloterdijk railway station in 1956 should have meant the end of the village. Earlier, in 1860, much of the town was destroyed in a great fire, but had been rebuilt. The construction of the Coentunnel and a new business district almost led to the destruction of the entire village, but the Petruskerk and a few houses were spared in order to preserve the town’s history.

The 1956 station was moved to the northwest in 1985, along a new rail spur to Zaandam that had opened in 1983.Tram service also moved to the new station in 1985. The station was expanded to two levels in 1986 when the Schiphol line was opened, and in 1997 the Amsterdam Metro came to Sloterdijk.

On 21 April 2012, more than 100 passengers were injured when two trains collided head-on in Sloterdijk. Among those hurt, 56 suffered severe injuries and 13 were in a critical condition.

Since the 1960s, three new business areas have been laid out in the vicinity of the old village. When Amsterdam was divided into boroughs, Sloterdijk became part of the new borough of Bos en Lommer. The business districts fell under the jurisdiction of Westpoort. In 2010 Sloterdijk became part of the new stadsdeel of Amsterdam-West.
