= Zeeheldenbuurt =

- Neighbourhood of Amsterdam
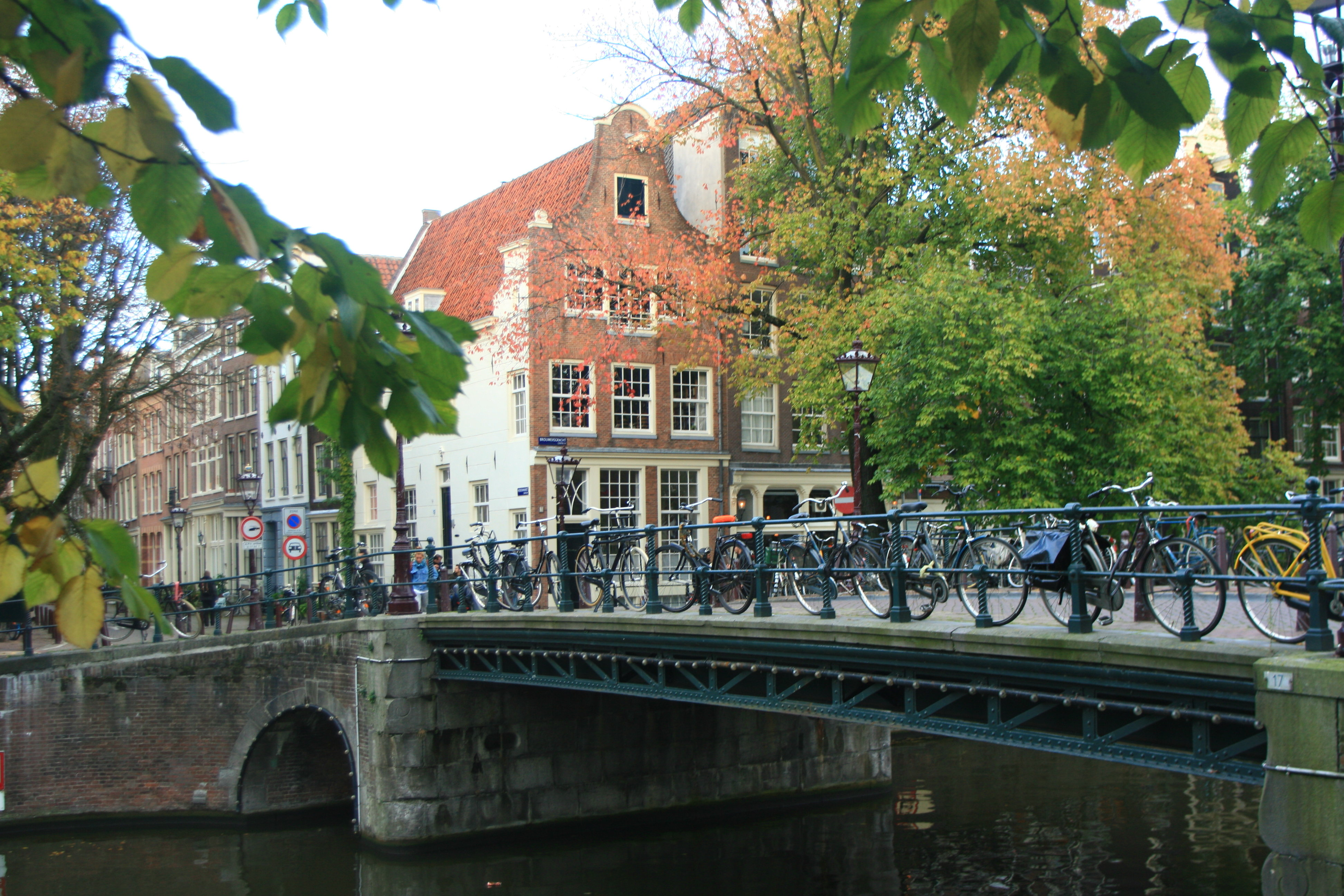
- A view of Houtmankade

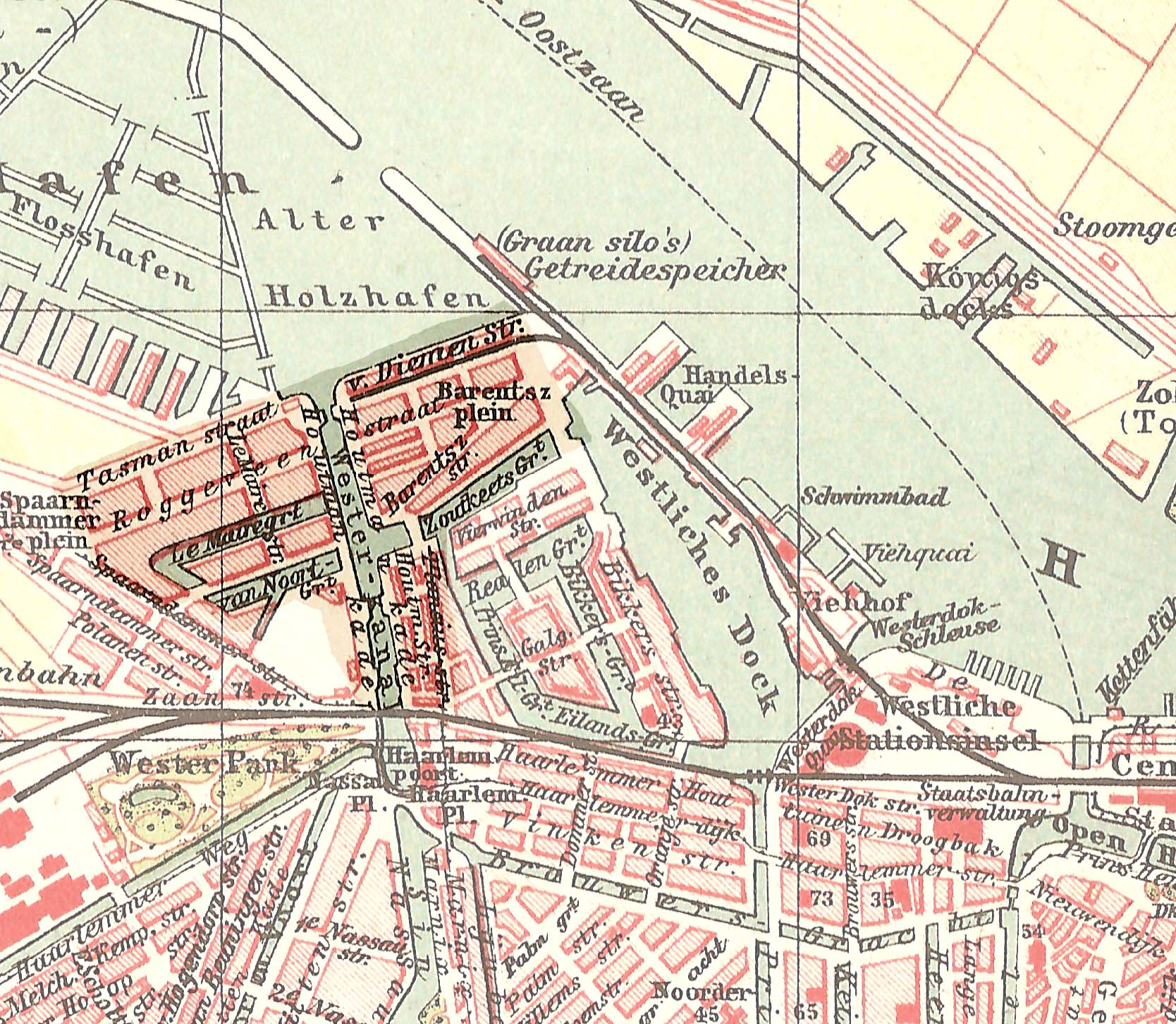
- Zeeheldenbuurt in 1901
- Coordinates: 52°23′N 4°53′E
- Country: Netherlands
- Province: North Holland
- Municipality: Amsterdam
- Borough: West
- Time zone: CET (UTC+01)

The Zeeheldenbuurt is a neighbourhood of Amsterdam, Netherlands. Located in the borough Amsterdam-West, it borders directly on the Westelijke Eilanden to the west. It lies between the Westerkanaal and the Westerdok; to the north is Houthaven and the IJ. The neighbourhood is served by the S100 road, and is sometimes confused with the nearby Admiralenbuurt.
