= Kolenkit District =

Coordinates: 52°22′43″N 4°50′29″E

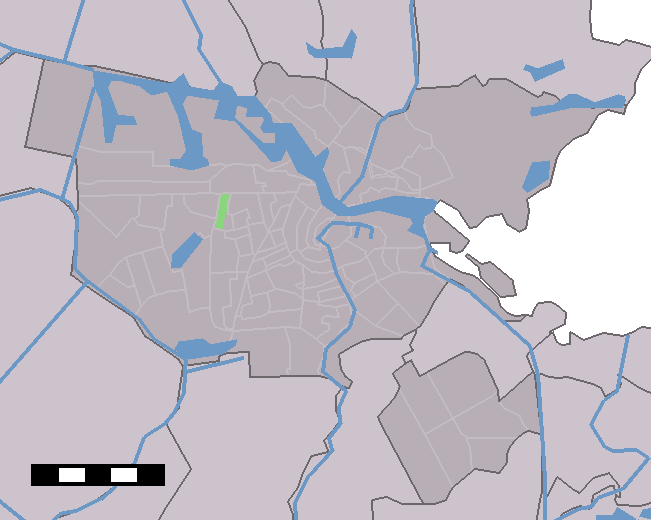
The Kolenkit District in Amsterdam

Kolenkit District (Dutch: Kolenkitbuurt) is a neighbourhood in Amsterdam, Netherlands.

In 2009 Eberhard van der Laan, the Minister of Housing, referred to the neighborhood as the worst in his "40 problem neighbourhoods" list.

Since 2009, major improvements have been made to the neighborhood, by demolishing apartments blocks which were too small and not built to the current standard, and replacing them with newly built, more spacious housing. This program will continue to run until (at least) 2021.Link

Cascoland, a small international network of artists, architects and designers formed by Dutch community artists Fiona Bell and Roel Schoenmakers, won a tender to start a process of empowerment in the Kolenkitbuurt. Since 2010 they organised playful activities and created a labyrinth of fences and four mobile hen houses which served as a meeting place, helping residents to initiate and manage their own projects in an urban revival process.
