= Landlust =

Coordinates: 52°22′46.96″N 4°51′32.26″E

- Neighborhood of Amsterdam
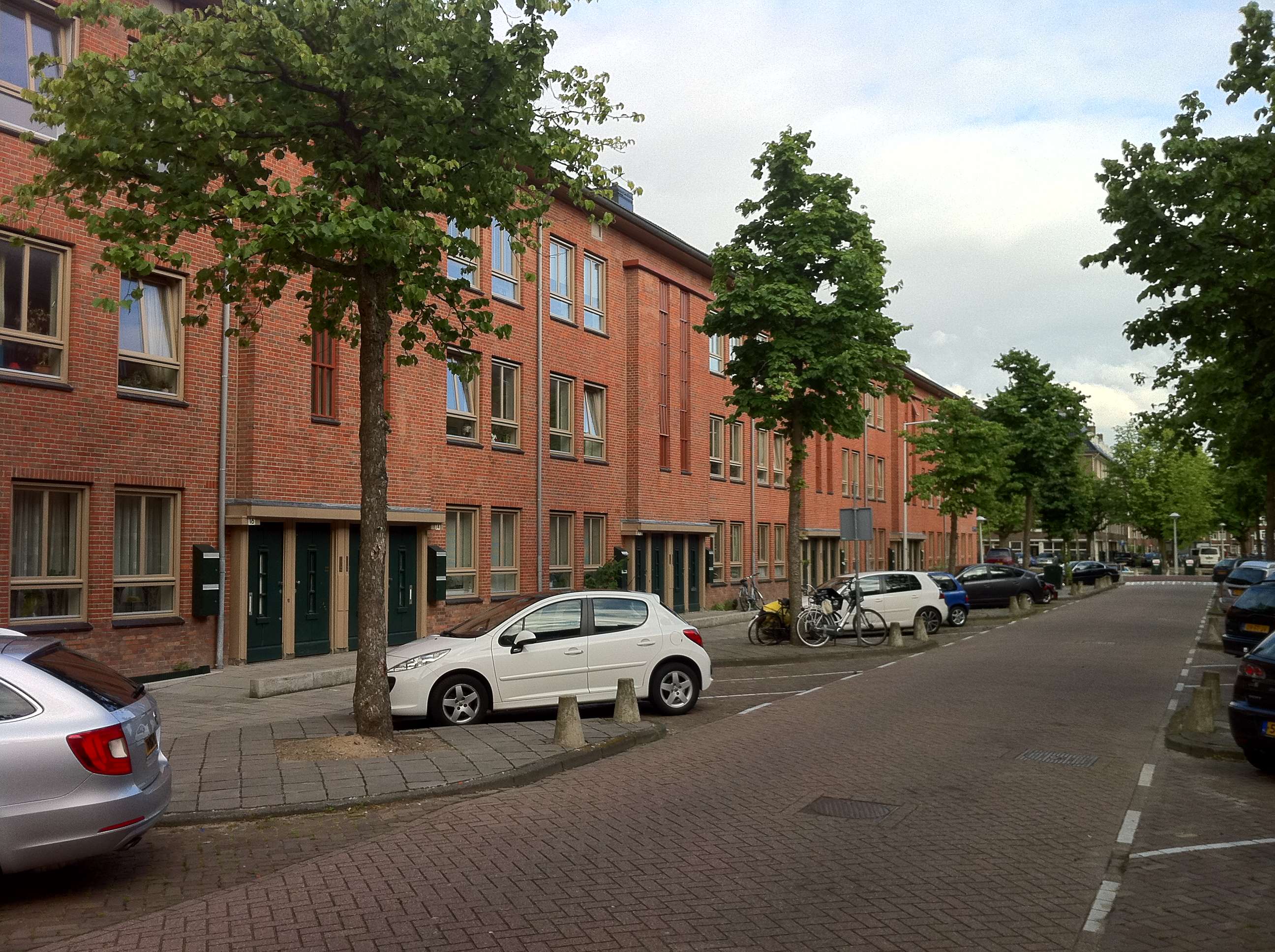
- Joris van Andringastraat
- Interactive map of Landlust
- Country: Netherlands
- Province: North Holland
- COROP: Amsterdam
- Time zone: UTC+1 (CET)

Landlust is a neighborhood of Amsterdam, Netherlands. The neighborhood was built before and after World War II.
