= Westelijk Havengebied =

- Neighborhood of Amsterdam
- Country: Netherlands
- Province: North Holland
- COROP: Amsterdam
- Time zone: UTC+1 (CET)

Westelijk Havengebied is a neighborhood of Amsterdam, Netherlands.
