= Waterwijk =

- Neighborhood of Amsterdam
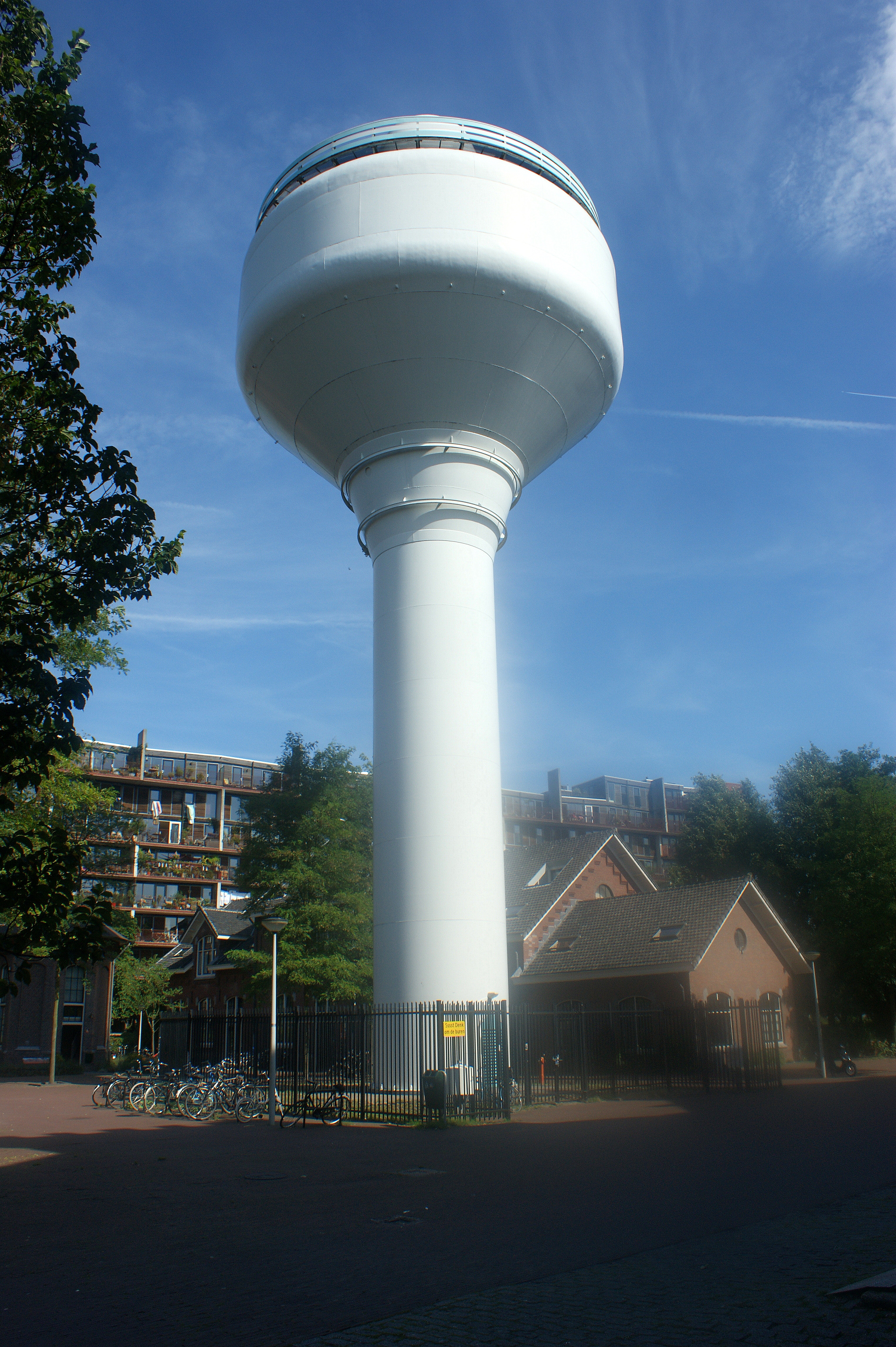
- The Water Tower on Waterkeringweg, in the heart of the Waterwijk
- Interactive map of Waterwijk
- Coordinates: 52°23′02″N 4°52′08″E
- Country: Netherlands
- Province: North Holland
- COROP: Amsterdam
- Borough: Amsterdam-West
- Time zone: UTC+1 (CET)

Waterwijk (also: Gemeente Waterleiding Terrain) is a neighborhood of Amsterdam, Netherlands built on the site of the Amsterdam municipal waterworks on the corner of Haarlemmerweg and Van Hallstraat in Amsterdam-West. In this neighborhood, an ecodistrict has been implemented.

In the 6-hectare neighborhood, cars may only access the parking areas for the apartment buildings from the streets that form the edges of the neighborhood; all of the inner areas of the neighborhood are car-free.
