= Staatsliedenbuurt =

- Neighborhood
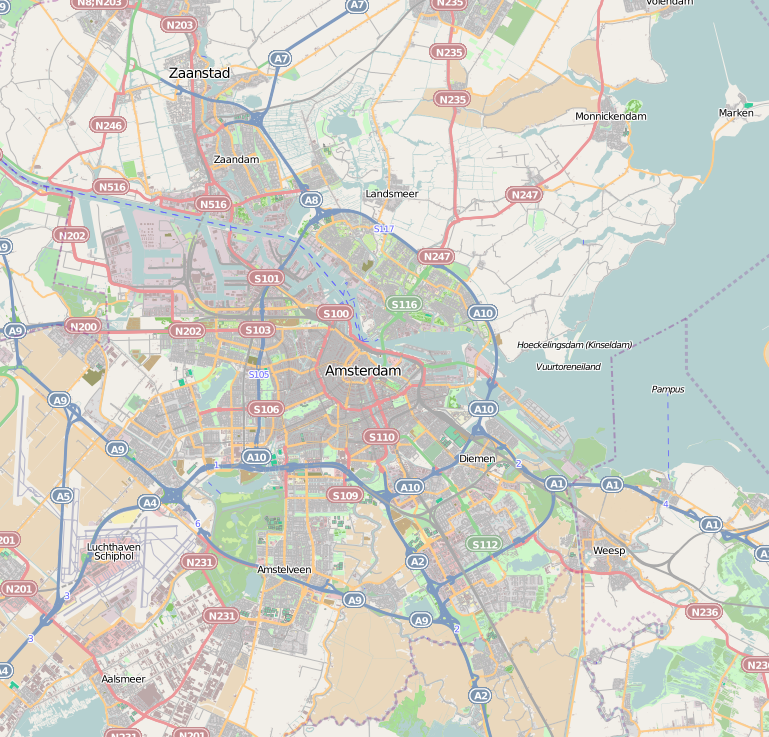
- Location within the Amsterdam metropolitan area
- Country: Netherlands
- Province: North Holland
- Municipality: Amsterdam
- Borough: West
- Postal codes: 1051, 1052

The Staatsliedenbuurt (pronounced [ˈstaːtslidə(m)ˌbyːrt]; lit. 'Neighborhood of the Statesmen') is a neighborhood in Amsterdam borough of West. It lies south of the Haarlemmertrekvaart canal and west of the Singelgracht canal route, which includes the local portions Kattensloot and Kostverlorenvaart.

== History ==
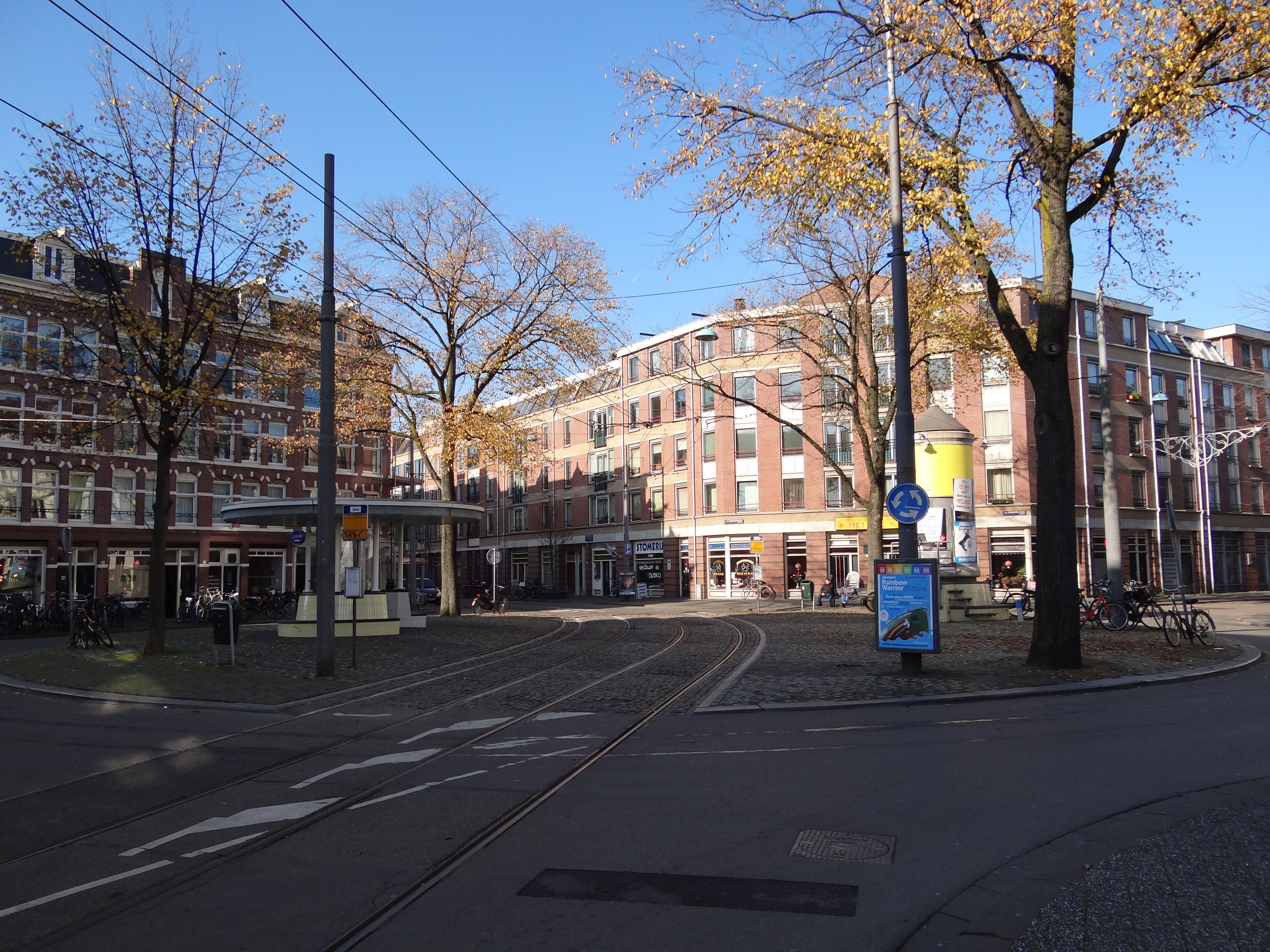
Van Limburg Stirumplein

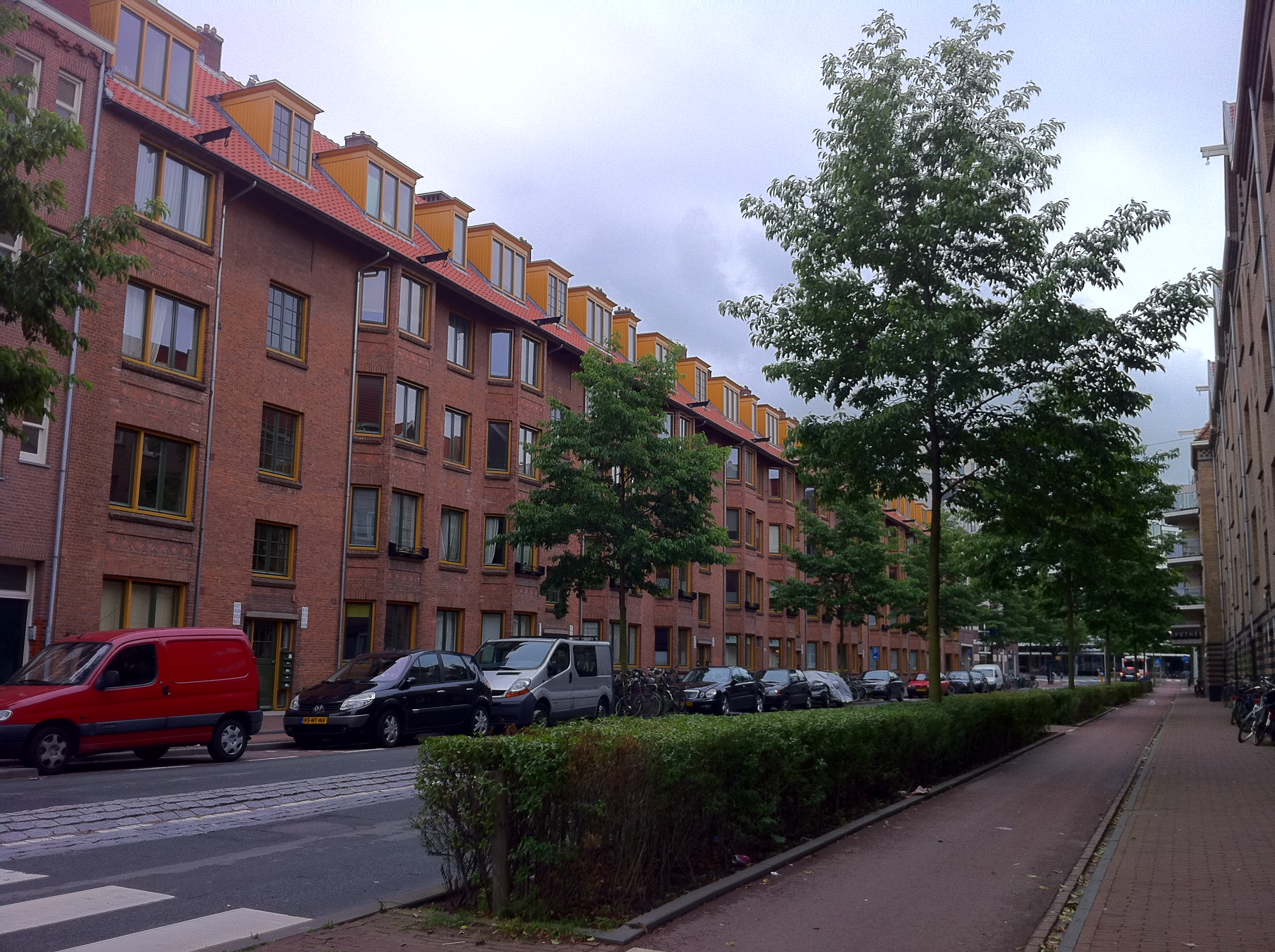
Workers' houses in the Staatsliedenbuurt by architects H. P. Berlage and Jop van Epen

Until 1877, the area was partly part of the former Sloten municipality. That year, the northeastern part of Sloten was annexed by Amsterdam. The part closest to the Singelgracht was already within Amsterdam's borders and was a neighborhood with many windmills just outside the city limits. The Kostverlorenvaart served as the vital traffic artery that opened up the area. The canal connecting Amsterdam to Haarlem, the Haarlemmervaart, was and remains the northern boundary of the neighborhood. A key attraction was Tweehonderd Roe, a tavern just outside the city limits, which did not have to pay city taxes. After the annexation, the Staatsliedenbuurt was developed, with streets named after Dutch statesmen from the 18th and 19th centuries.
