= Bos en Lommer =

Coordinates: 52°23′N 4°51′E

- Neighborhood of Amsterdam
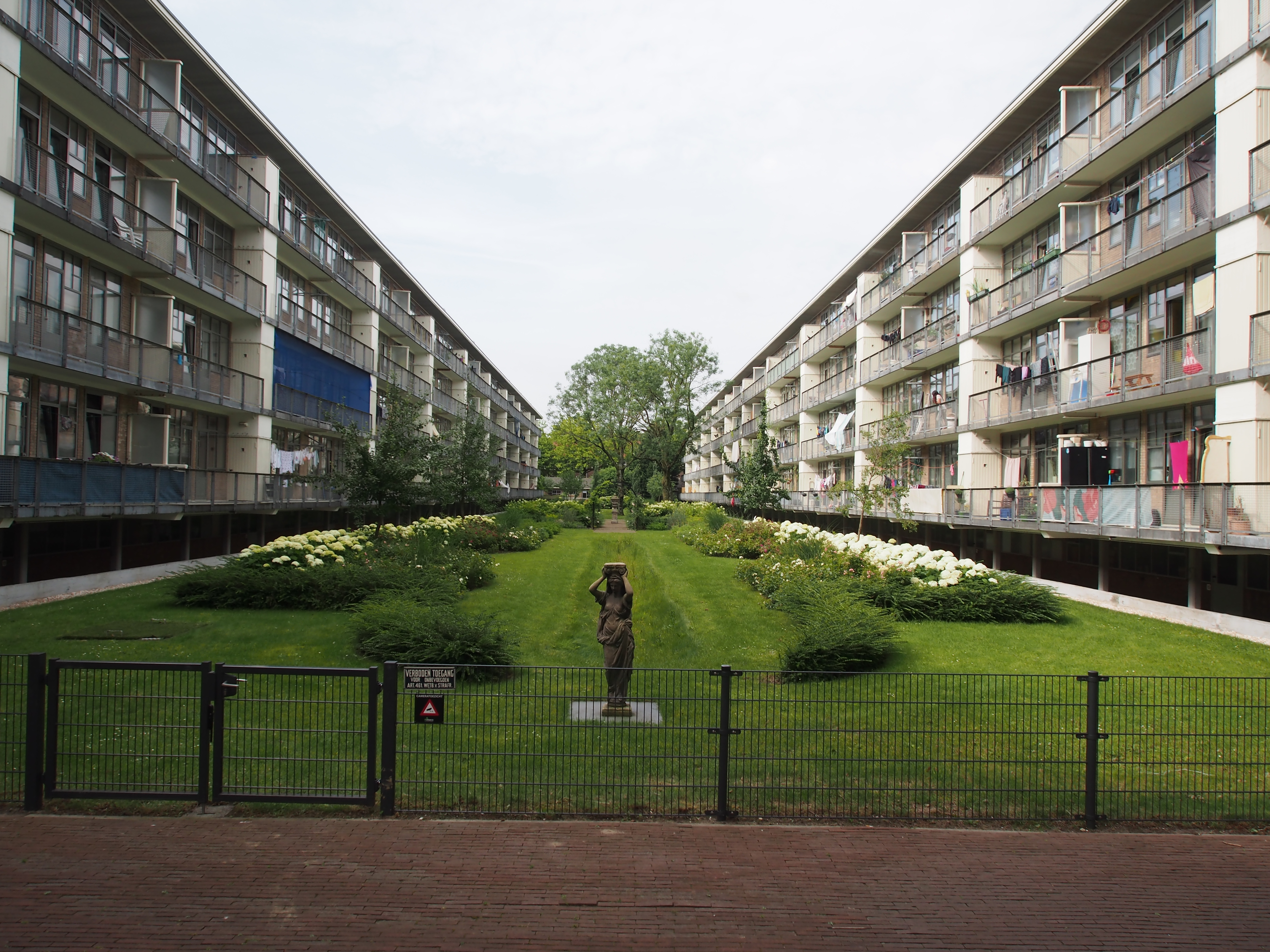
- Garden between the Charlotte de Bourbonstraat, Louise de Colignystraat and Anna van Burenstraat

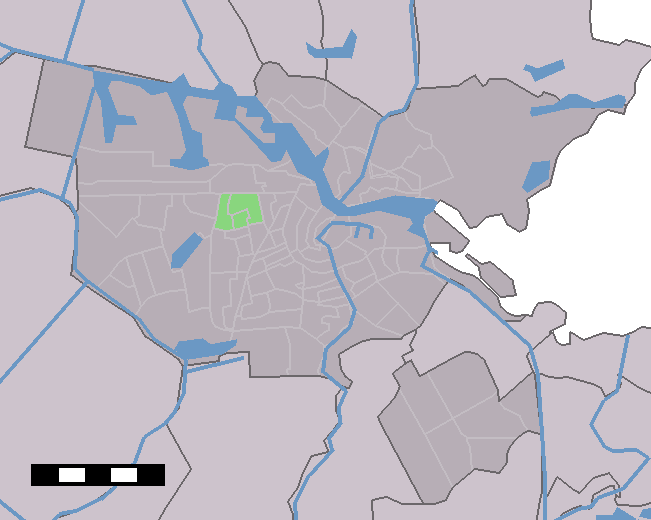
- Location of Bos en Lommer (green) in Amsterdam
- Country: Netherlands
- Province: North Holland
- COROP: Amsterdam
- Urban district: West
- Time zone: UTC+1 (CET)

Bos en Lommer (Dutch pronunciation: [ˈbɔs ɛn ˈlɔmər]; English: Wood and Shade) is a neighborhood of Amsterdam, Netherlands. From 1990 to 2010 it was considered a district of the municipality of Amsterdam in the province of North Holland. As of May 1, 2010, it was merged into the new Amsterdam-West borough.

Geographically the district lies west of the historical city center of Amsterdam. On the north side it is bordered by the Haarlemmerweg and Westerpark, and on its south side it is bordered by the Jan van Galenstraat. The eastern area of the district is known for hosting the 'Centrale Markthallen'.

The neighbourhood was built in part before the Second World War, as part of the 1934 Algemeen Uitbreidingsplan (general expansion plan), and other parts were built mainly by housing corporations after the war.

The name of the neighbourhood is derived from a demolished farmstead with the same name, which was located at what is now the central square of the neighbourhood, the Bos en Lommerplein.
