= Spaarndammerbuurt =

- Neighborhood of Amsterdam
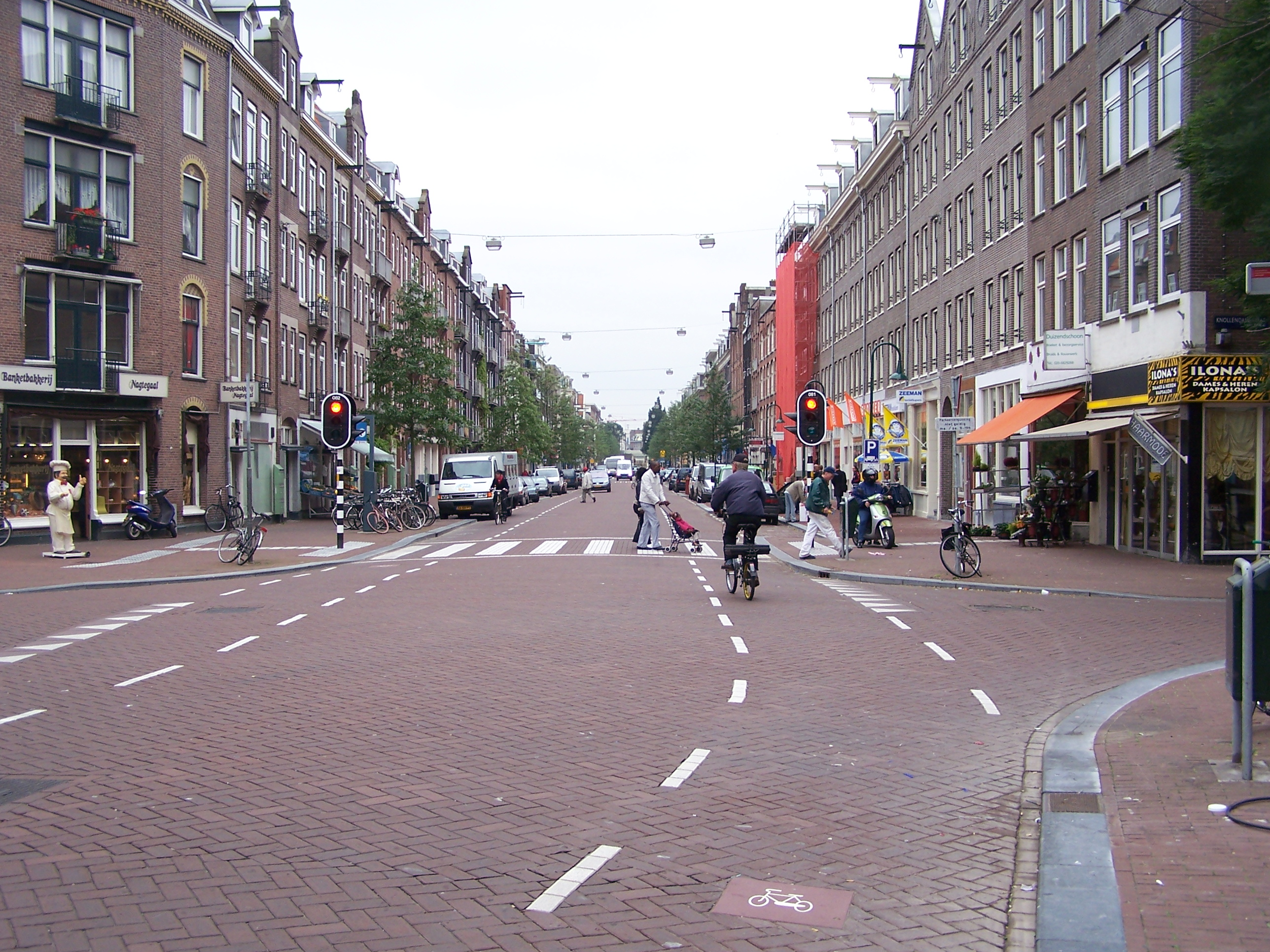
- Spaarndammerstraat
- Interactive map of Spaarndammerbuurt
- Coordinates: 52.3899°N 4.8780°E
- Country: Netherlands
- Province: North Holland
- COROP: Amsterdam
- Time zone: UTC+1 (CET)

Spaarndammerbuurt is a neighborhood of Amsterdam, Netherlands.
