= Amsterdam Oud-West =

Oud-West
- Neighbourhood
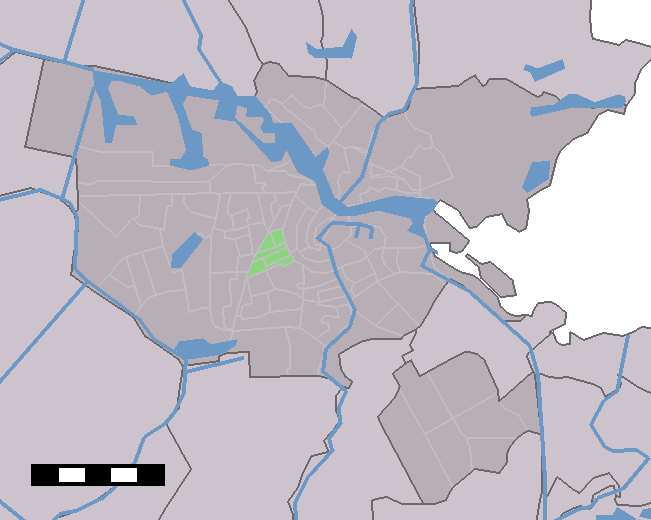
- Country: Netherlands
- Province: North Holland
- COROP: Amsterdam
- Borough: West
- Time zone: UTC+1 (CET)

Oud-West is a neighborhood of Amsterdam, Netherlands, roughly covering the area between the Overtoom, a major thoroughfare west of the city centre, and the parallel De Clercqstraat, a shopping street. The exact boundaries are the Vondelpark and the Singelgracht, Hugo de Grootgracht and Kostverlorenvaart canals. The neighbourhood consists of two historically and demographically distinct communities: the Overtoombuurt in the south and the Kinkerbuurt in the north.

Oud-West was a separate borough of Amsterdam until the 2010 borough reforms, when it merged with the boroughs of Bos en Lommer, De Baarsjes and Westerpark to form the larger borough of Amsterdam-West.

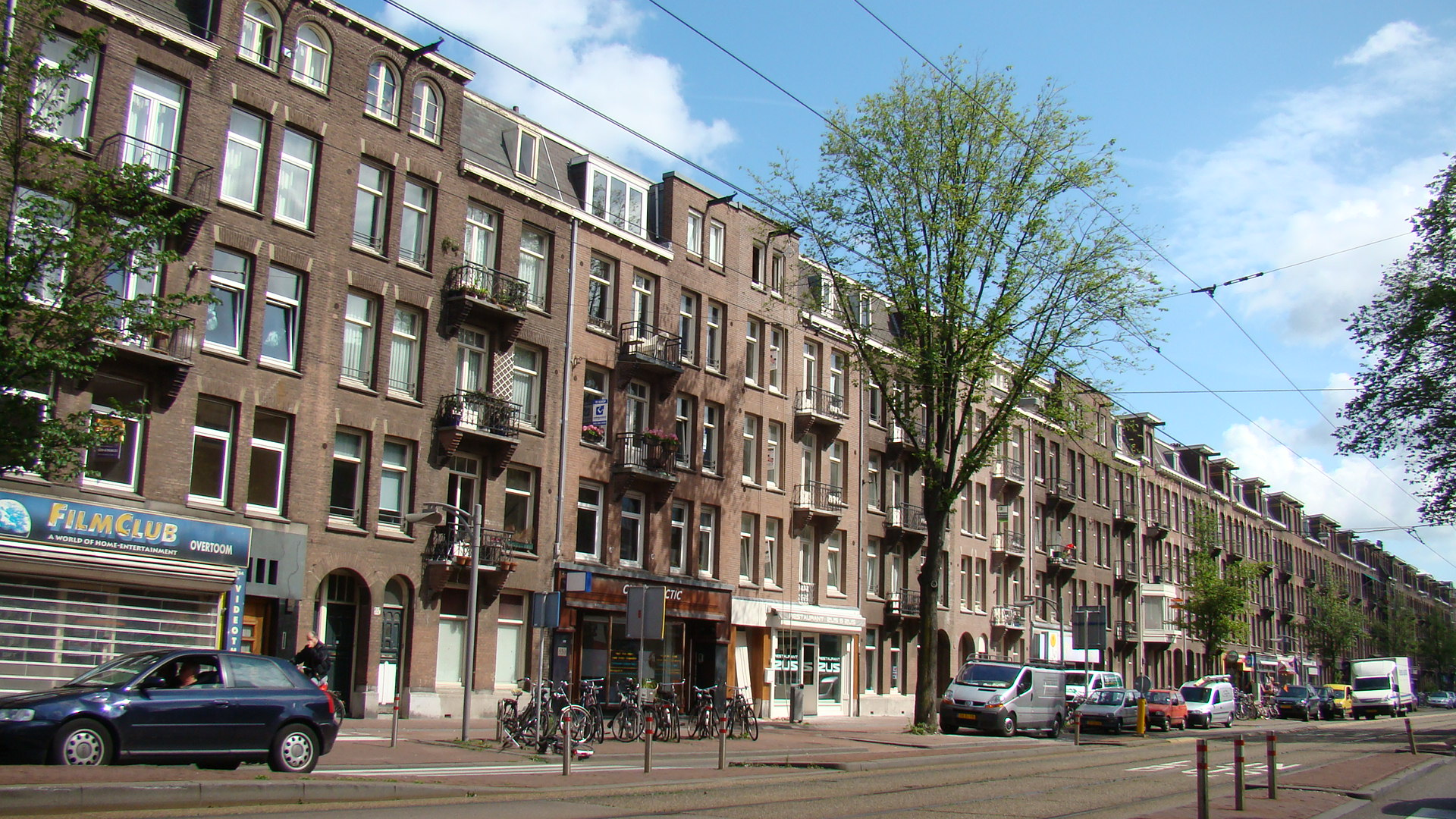
Overtoom in Oud-West, Amsterdam.

As of 2003, the neighbourhood counts 31,741 inhabitants representing 177 nationalities. The area of Oud-West is approximately 1.70 km^{2} large. Main shopping areas are the Kinkerstraat, De Clercqstraat, Jan Pieter Heijestraat, Overtoom, and Eerste Constantijn Huygensstraat.

Oud-West is served by tram routes 1, 7 and 17 connecting the centre of the city with the western suburbs via the Overtoom (route 1) and Kinkerstraat (routes 7 and 17), as well as routes 3 and 12 running along the Eerste Constantijn Huygensstraat.
