= De Baarsjes =

- District of Amsterdam
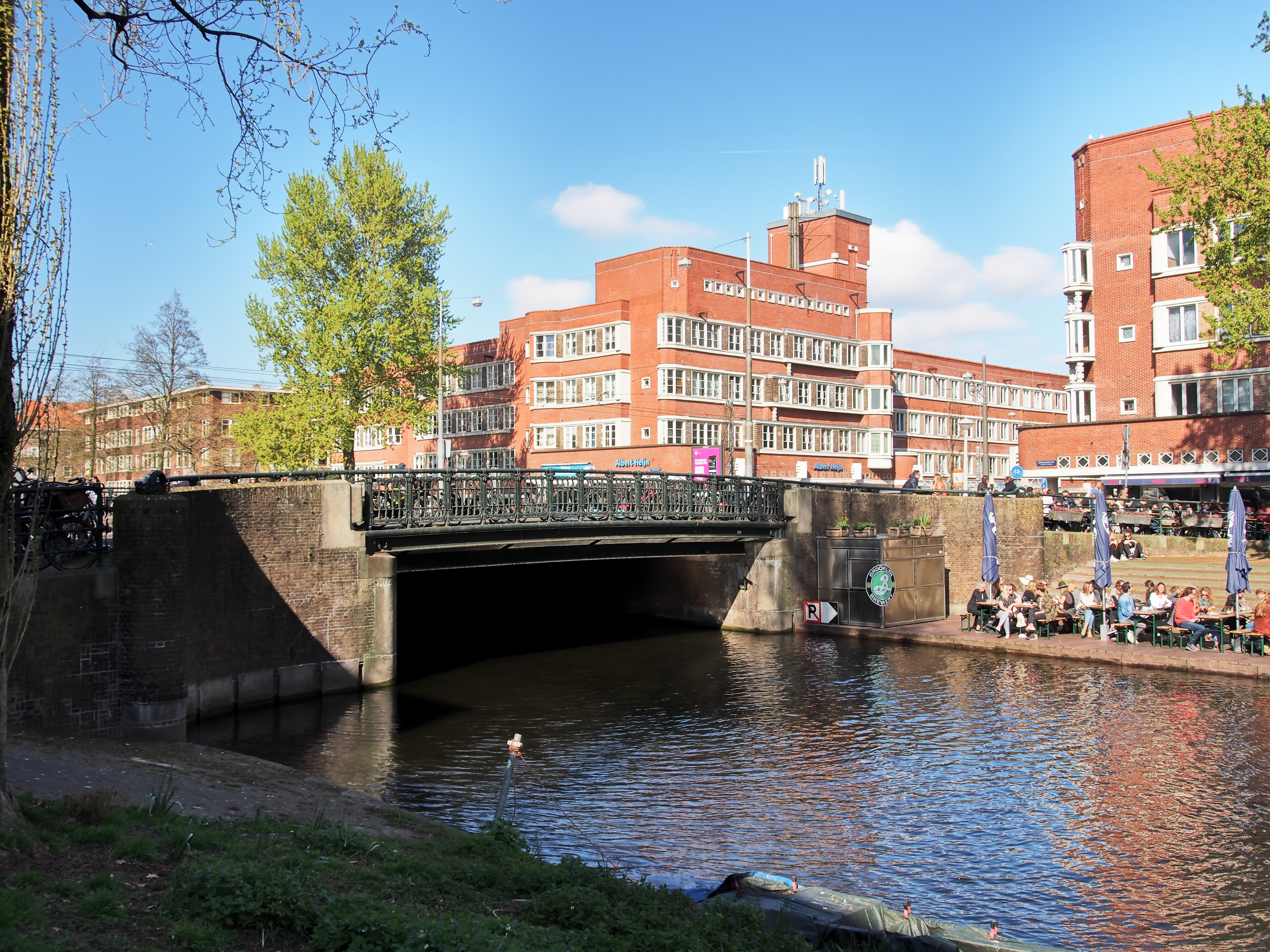
- Bridge of the Jan Evertsenstraat over the Admiralengracht in 2017

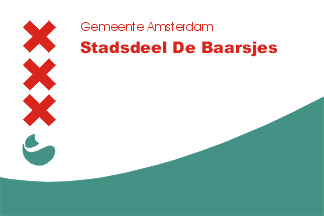
- Flag

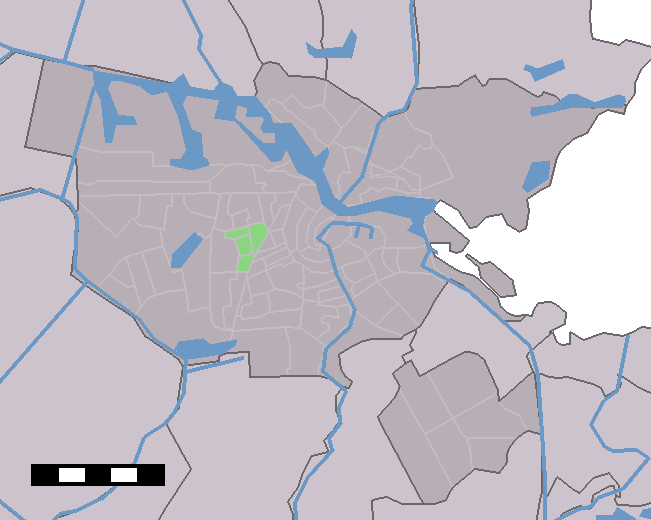
- Location of De Baarsjes in Amsterdam
- Coordinates: 52°22′04″N 4°51′27″E
- Country: Netherlands
- Province: North Holland
- Municipality: Amsterdam
- Borough: Amsterdam-West
- Time zone: UTC+1 (CET)
  - Summer (DST): UTC+2 (CEST)

De Baarsjes (Dutch pronunciation: [də ˈbaːrɕəs]) is a district (Dutch: wijk) in Amsterdam-West situated west of the city center of Amsterdam, Netherlands. Named after a former hamlet, urban development started in the 1920s. It contains the neighbourhoods Admiralenbuurt, Chassébuurt, Postjesbuurt, and Trompbuurt.

== Etymology ==
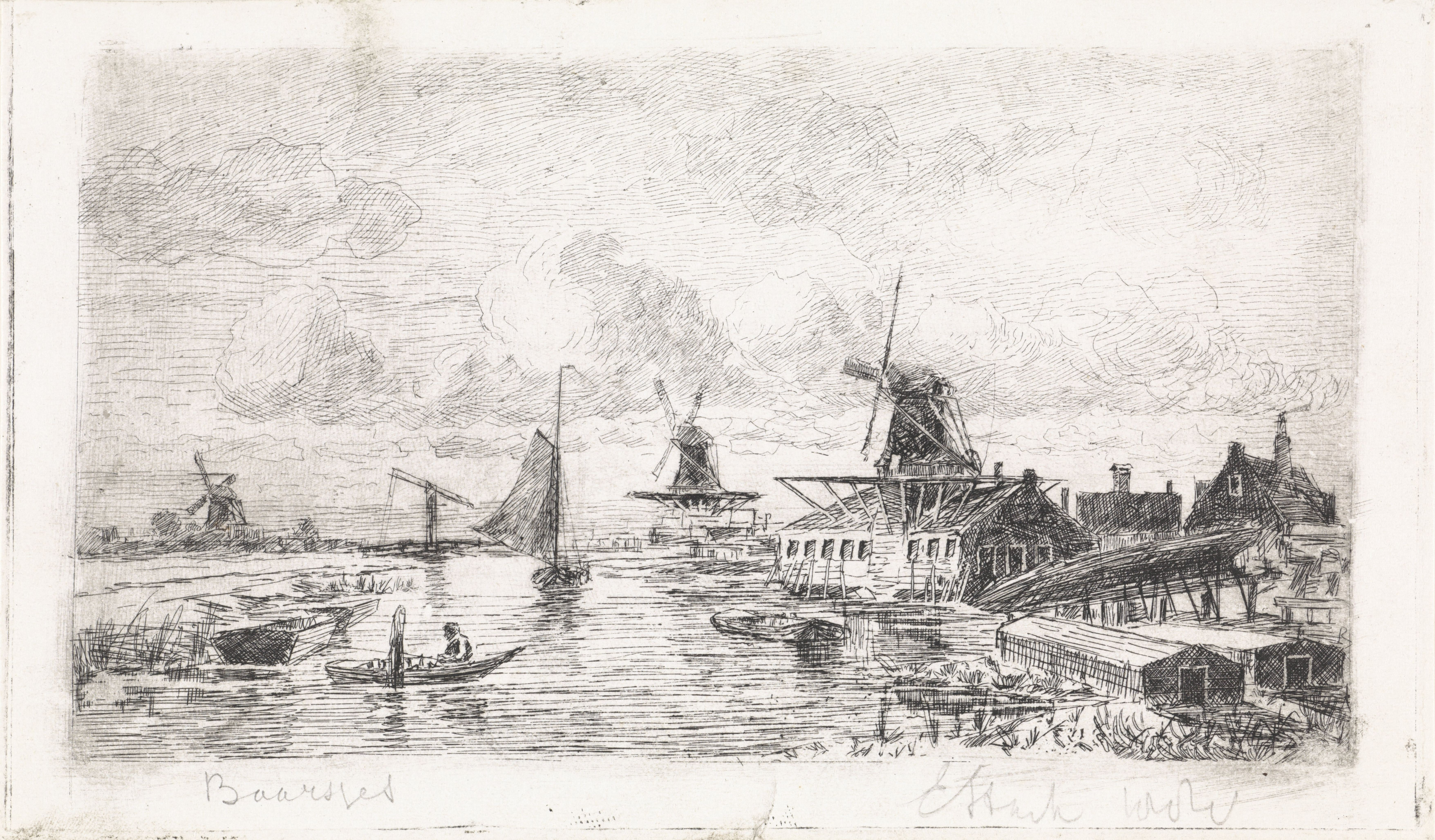
Etching of the hamlet of De Baarsjes by Elias Stark from 1881

The name comes from the former hamlet De Baarsjes (The Little Perches) that was formed in the 17th century, which in turn derived its name from an inn called De Drie Baarsjes (The Three Little Perches) situated on the eastern border of the present-day district.

== History ==
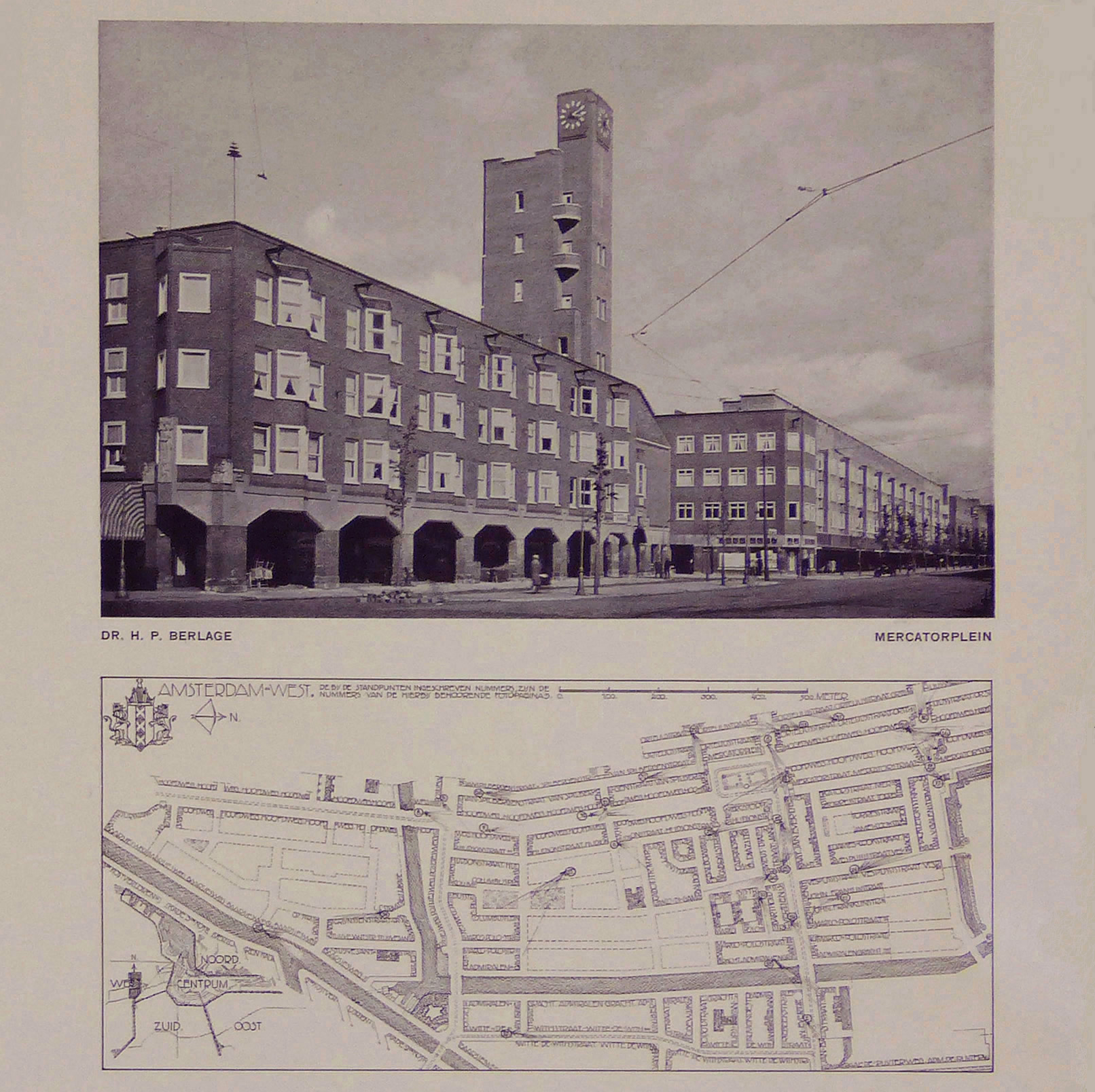
H. P. Berlage's Plan West as presented in Wendingen in 1927

Built during the first half of the 20th century along a tram line that brought commuters to the city centre, De Baarsjes was formulated by the architect Hendrik Petrus Berlage who designed the main square Mercatorplein.

In 1990, De Baarsjes became a borough (Dutch: stadsdeel) of Amsterdam.

As it was mostly built before World War II, it was all built to last so when it came to urban renewal in the 1990s, most buildings were renovated and not razed to the ground. Facades were cleaned, suspicious bars and bordellos were closed and ambitious plans to deal with crime and safety were undertaken.

In 2010, the borough of De Baarsjes was merged with Bos en Lommer, Oud-West, and Westerpark into the new borough of Amsterdam-West.

== Geography ==
The boundaries of De Baarsjes are Jan van Galenstraat in the north, Westerlijk Marktkanaal and Kostverlorenvaart in the east, Surinamestraat and Surinameplein in the south, and Rembrandtpark, Jan Evertsenstraat, and the A10 motorway in the west. The area contains the four neighbourhoods (Dutch: buurten): Trompbuurt in the north, Admiralenbuurt or Mercatorbuurt in the west, Chassébuurt in the east, and Postjesbuurt or Westindische buurt in the south.

== Heritage sites ==
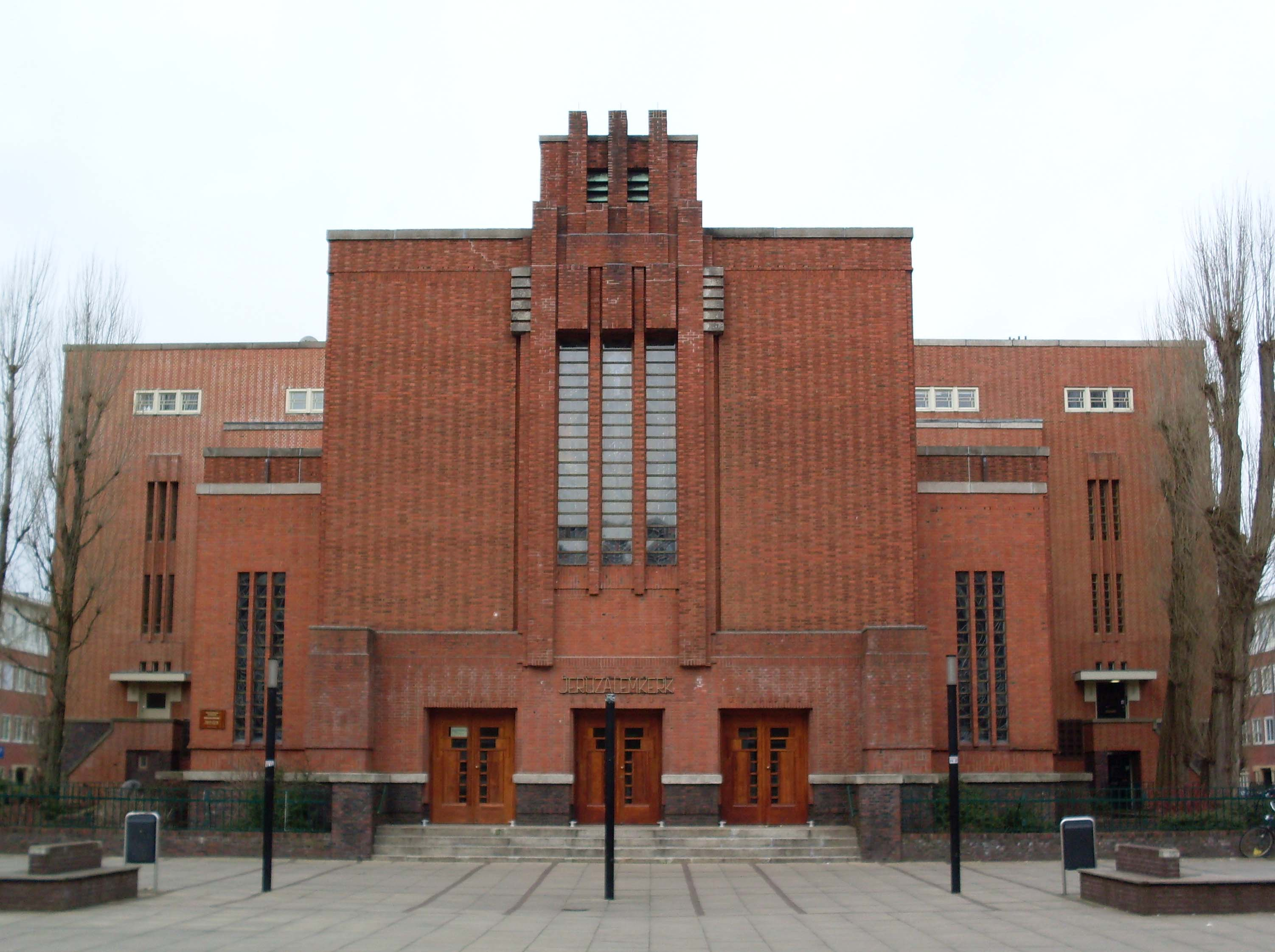
Jerusalem Church from 1929

The district contains seven buildings and on the district boundary is a bridge that have been designated as rijksmonument (national heritage site), all in the architectural style of the Amsterdam School:

- 4th Crafts School, 1923
- Corantijn School, 1923
- Jan Maijen School, 1926
- Mercatorplein Complex (1), houses and shops, 1927
- Mercatorplein Complex (2), houses, 1927
- Mercatorplein Complex (3), houses and shops, 1927
- Jerusalem Church, 1929
- Bridge 382, 1935
