= Overtoombuurt =

Overtoombuurt Oud-West
- Neighborhood of Amsterdam
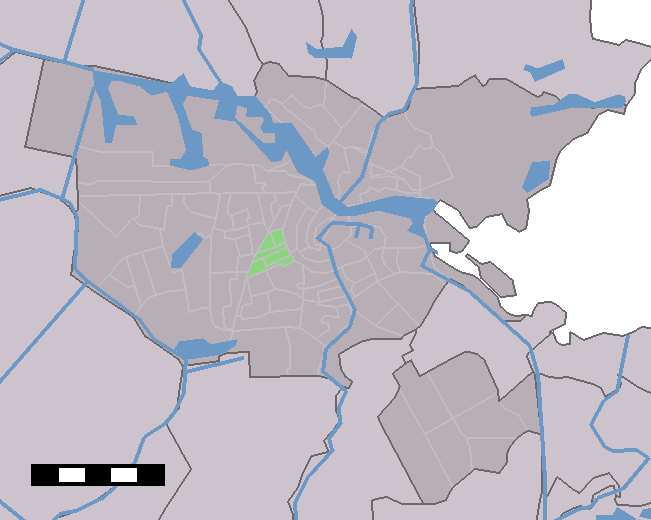
- Country: Netherlands
- Province: North Holland
- COROP: Amsterdam
- Borough: West
- Time zone: UTC+1 (CET)

Overtoombuurt is a neighborhood of Amsterdam, Netherlands. Along with the Kinkerbuurt, it is part of the larger neighborhood of Oud-West in the borough of Amsterdam-West. The borough administration distinguishes several smaller areas within the Overtoombuurt: the eastern part north of the Overtoom thoroughfare is called Helmersbuurt, the western section is called Cremerbuurt, while the area south of the Overtoom and adjacent to the Vondelpark is called the Vondelparkbuurt.

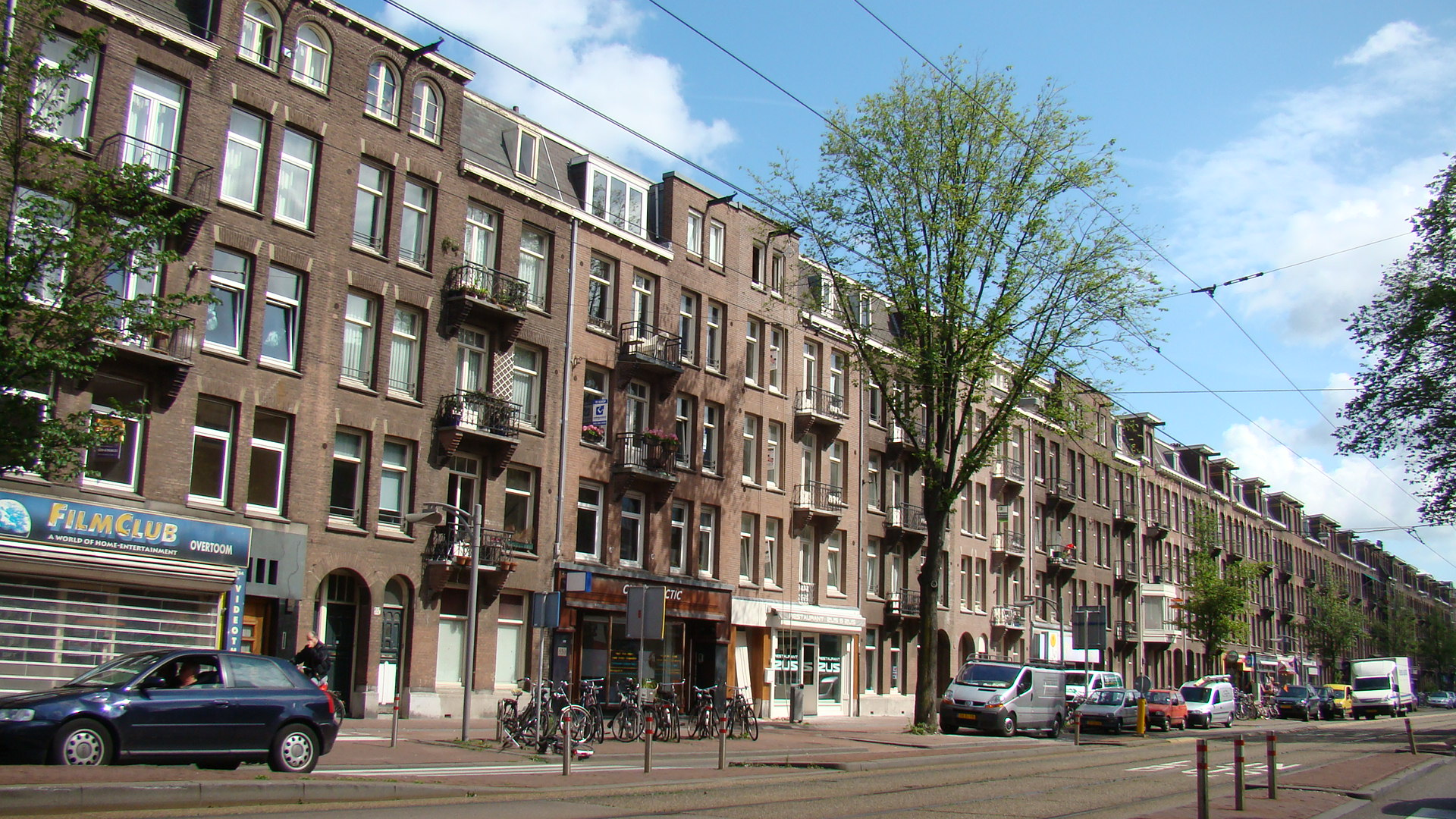
The Overtoom thoroughfare.

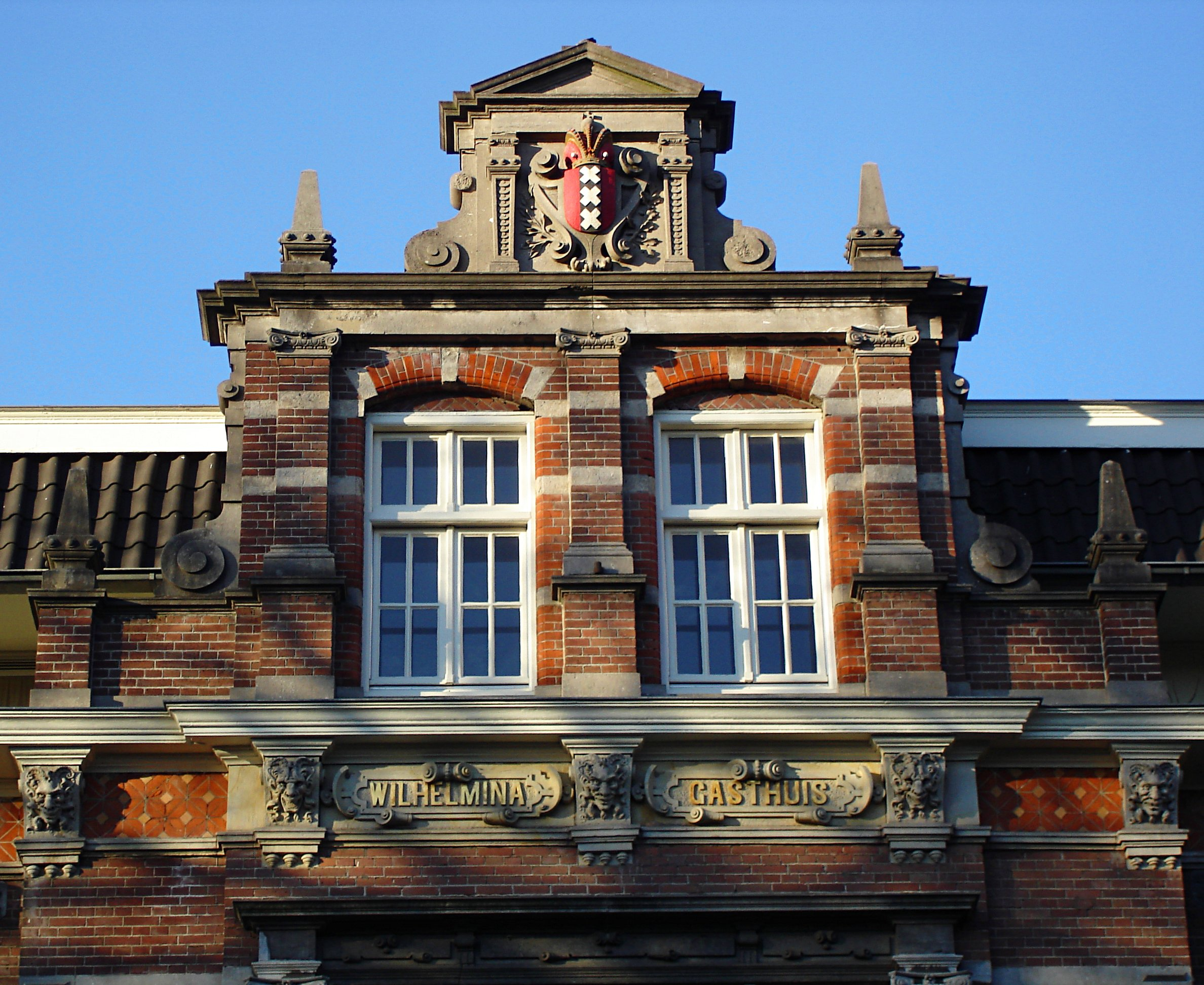
The former Wilhelmina Gasthuis hospital (1891).

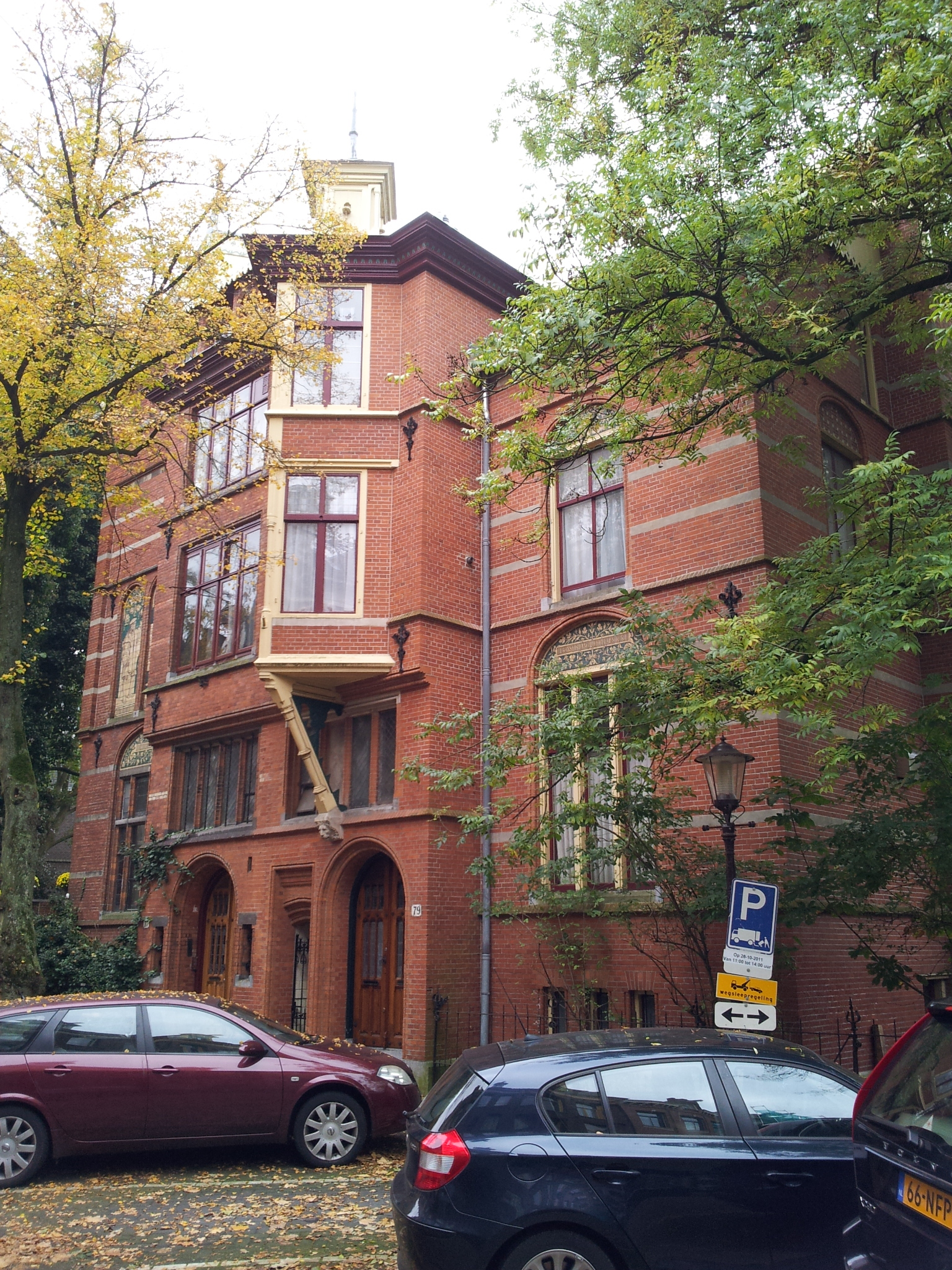
Vondelstraat 79.
