= Westermoskee =

Mosque in Netherlands

Westermoskee Ayasofya Camii
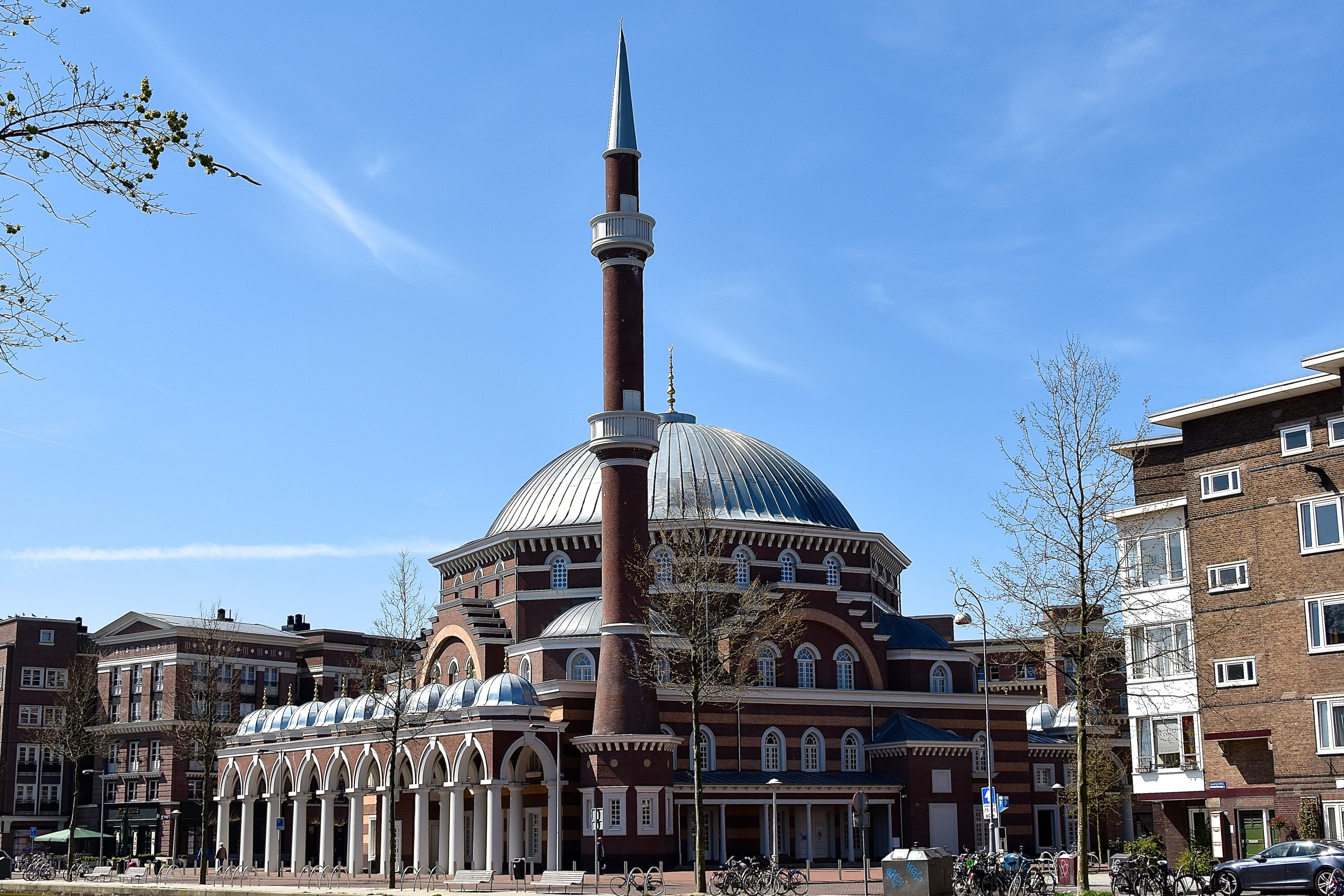
- Westermoskee in 2016

- Location in Amsterdam

Religion
- Affiliation: Islam

Location
- Location: Piri Reisplein 101; Amsterdam, Netherlands
- Coordinates: 52°21′58″N 4°51′38″E

Architecture
- Architects: Marc and Nada Breitman
- Type: Mosque
- Style: Amsterdam School/New Classical architecture
- Groundbreaking: 2013
- Completed: 2015
- Construction cost: € 6–7 million

Specifications
- Capacity: 1700 people
- Minaret: 1
- Minaret height: 42 metres

Website
- westermoskee.nl

Westermoskee (Dutch: [ˌʋɛstərmɔsˈkeː], transl. "Western Mosque"; Turkish: Ayasofya Camii, transl. "Holy Wisdom Mosque") is a mosque located in Amsterdam, Netherlands. It is situated on the bank of the canalized river Schinkel in the Chassébuurt in De Baarsjes in the borough of Amsterdam-West. With a floor surface of 800 m^{2} and a capacity of 1700 people, it is the largest mosque in Amsterdam.

== History ==
The building was designed by French traditional architects Marc and Nada Breitman, winners of the 2018 Driehaus Prize and part of the New Classical movement. Construction started in 2013 and the building was completed in 2015. The mosque was unofficially opened on 1 April 2016.

== Architecture ==
The mosque features a large Ottoman styled main dome, a single minaret and other Ottoman style elements blended with traditional Dutch architecture, like stepped gables and white window frames in a red brick facade.
