= Jan Blokker =

Dutch journalist, columnist, publicist, writer and historian

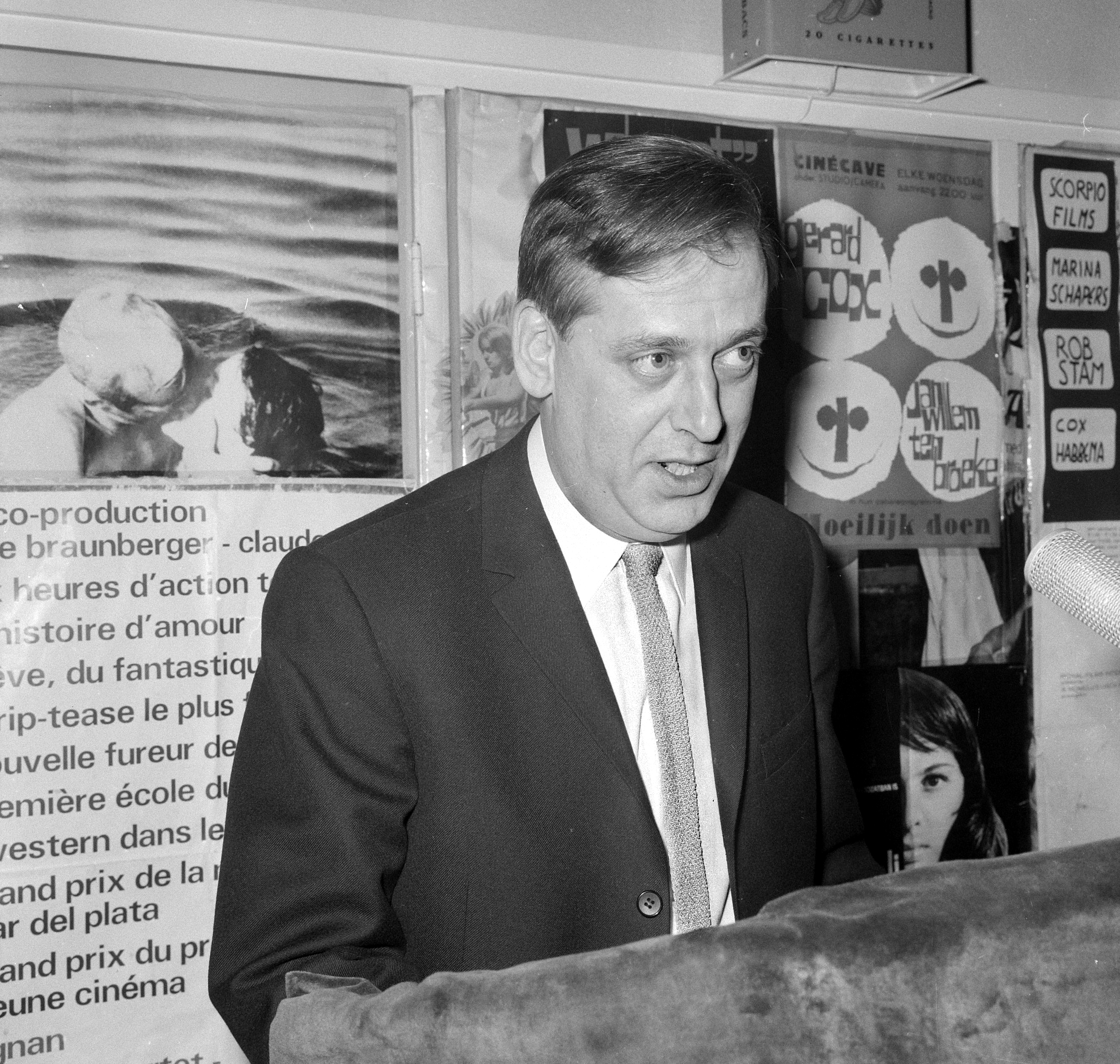
- Jan Blokker in 1966
- Born: Jan Andries Blokker Sr. 27 May 1927; Admiralenbuurt, Amsterdam, Netherlands
- Died: 6 July 2010 (aged 83); Netherlands
- Occupations: Writer, journalist

Jan Andries Blokker Sr. (27 May 1927 – 6 July 2010) was a Dutch journalist, columnist, publicist, writer, and amateur historian. In The Netherlands, Blokker was best known for his columns in De Volkskrant, which he wrote between 1968 and 2006.

== Biography ==
Blokker, born in the Admiralenbuurt in Amsterdam, grew up in a social liberal family. His father was an office clerk. At the age of seven, he and his father visited the Cineac theatre weekly for the Polygoon newsreel.

Blokker went to the HBS on the Keizersgracht. In 1944, after getting his gymnasium-alpha diploma, he went on to study Neerlandistiek and history but did not complete his studies.

In 1950, Blokker made his debut as a novelist with the novelle Séjour, for which he won the Reina Prinsen Geerligs Award. Two more novels followed, Bij dag en ontij (1952) and Parijs, dode stad (1954). In 1952, Blokker became student reporter for the Dutch newspaper Het Parool. After a while, Simon Carmiggelt asked him to write film reviews. In 1954, he became a film critic at Algemeen Handelsblad. At the art section of the newspaper, he met important Dutch writers like Henk Hofland and Harry Mulisch.

Blokker was also a screenwriter who wrote the scripts for films like Fanfare by Bert Haanstra (1958) and Makkers Staakt uw Wild Geraas by Fons Rademakers (1960) and Monsieur Hawarden (1969). He was involved in the production of the VARA satirical television programme Zo is het toevallig ook nog eens een keer (1963–1964). He later joined the VPRO, where he served as editor-in-chief and contributed to the organisation’s editorial direction during a period of institutional change. He also provided commentary for VPRO documentary productions.

From 1968 on, he worked for De Volkskrant as a columnist. In the 1960s and 1970s, he was seen as the voice of the intellectual left, specialized in satirical pieces about politics, current affairs and whatever was fashionable with the left-wing readers of the newspaper. Between 1978 and 1983, he was adjunct editor in chief at the newspaper. He wrote the column until 2006, when a conflict forced him to leave the newspaper. He continued his column for nrc.next.
