= Johannes Lingelbach =

Dutch painter (1622–1674)

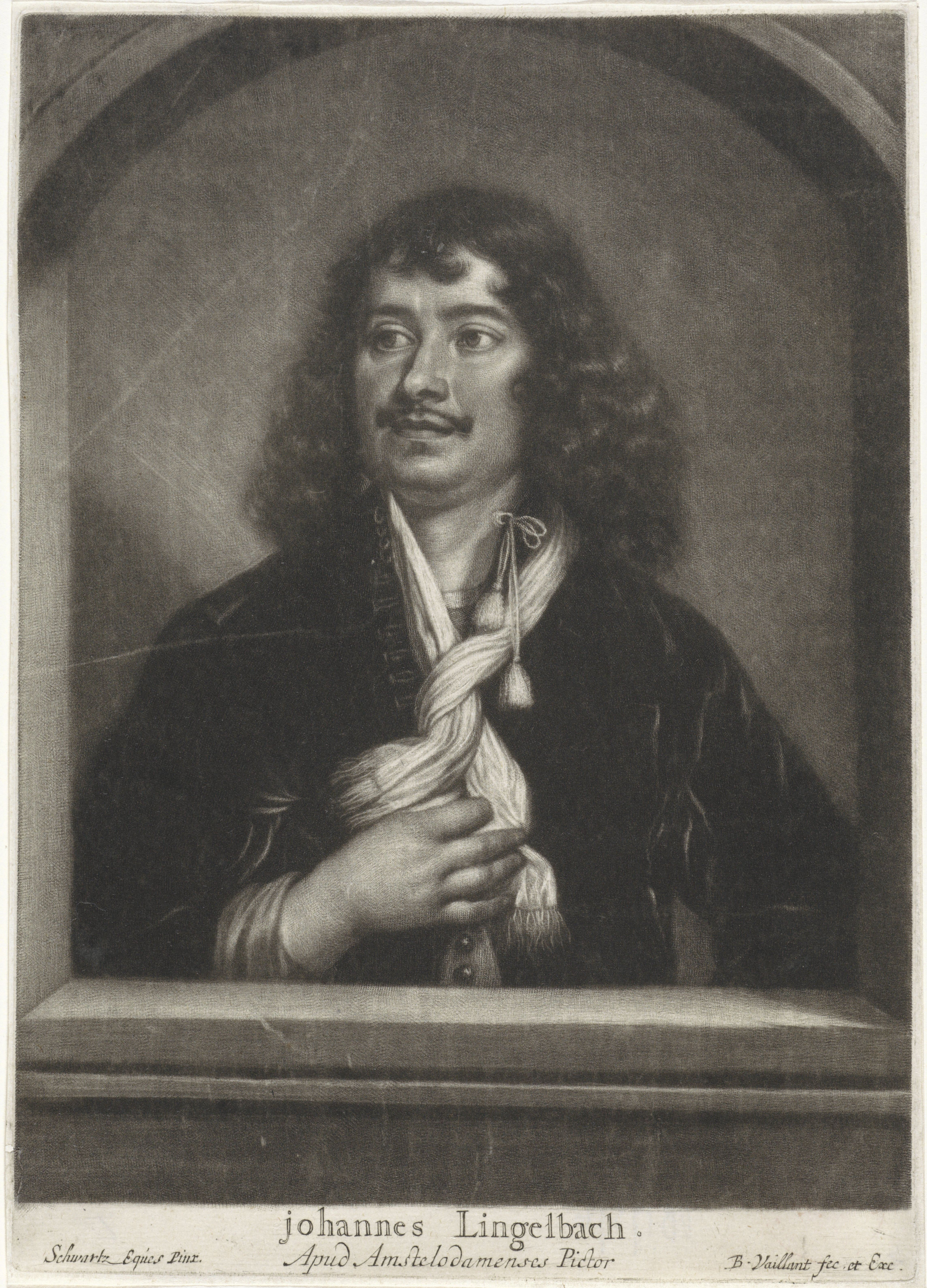
Mezzotint of Johannes Lingelbach by Bernard Vaillant

Johannes (or Johann) Lingelbach (1622 – 3 November 1674) was a Dutch Golden Age painter, associated with the second generation of Bambocciate, a group of genre painters working in Rome from 1625–1700.

== Biography ==
Lingelbach was born in Frankfurt as the son of David Lingelbach, a German innkeeper, who settled in Amsterdam with his wife and children in 1636 but remarried twice. In 1638 the father hired a labyrinth at Prinsengracht and started a new one at Rozengracht in 1646. Together with his son Philip he furnished the garden with an astronomical clock and machines, that could move or play music and depicting biblical or mythological scenes.

Johannes lived in Paris between 1642 and 1644, and moved to Lyon, Genoa and Rome where he collaborated with several Bentvueghels located near Piazza di Spagna before returning to Amsterdam in June 1650. In 1653 he married and his children were baptized in the Lutheran church. Initially he lived in or next to the labyrinth (and opposite of Rembrandt and Jan Abrahamsz. van Beerstraten) but in 1662 Lingelbach bought a house at Reestraat, now part of Hotel Pulitzer. He was friendly with Karel Dujardin, Jurriaen Ovens and Joan Huydecoper II living at Lauriergracht.

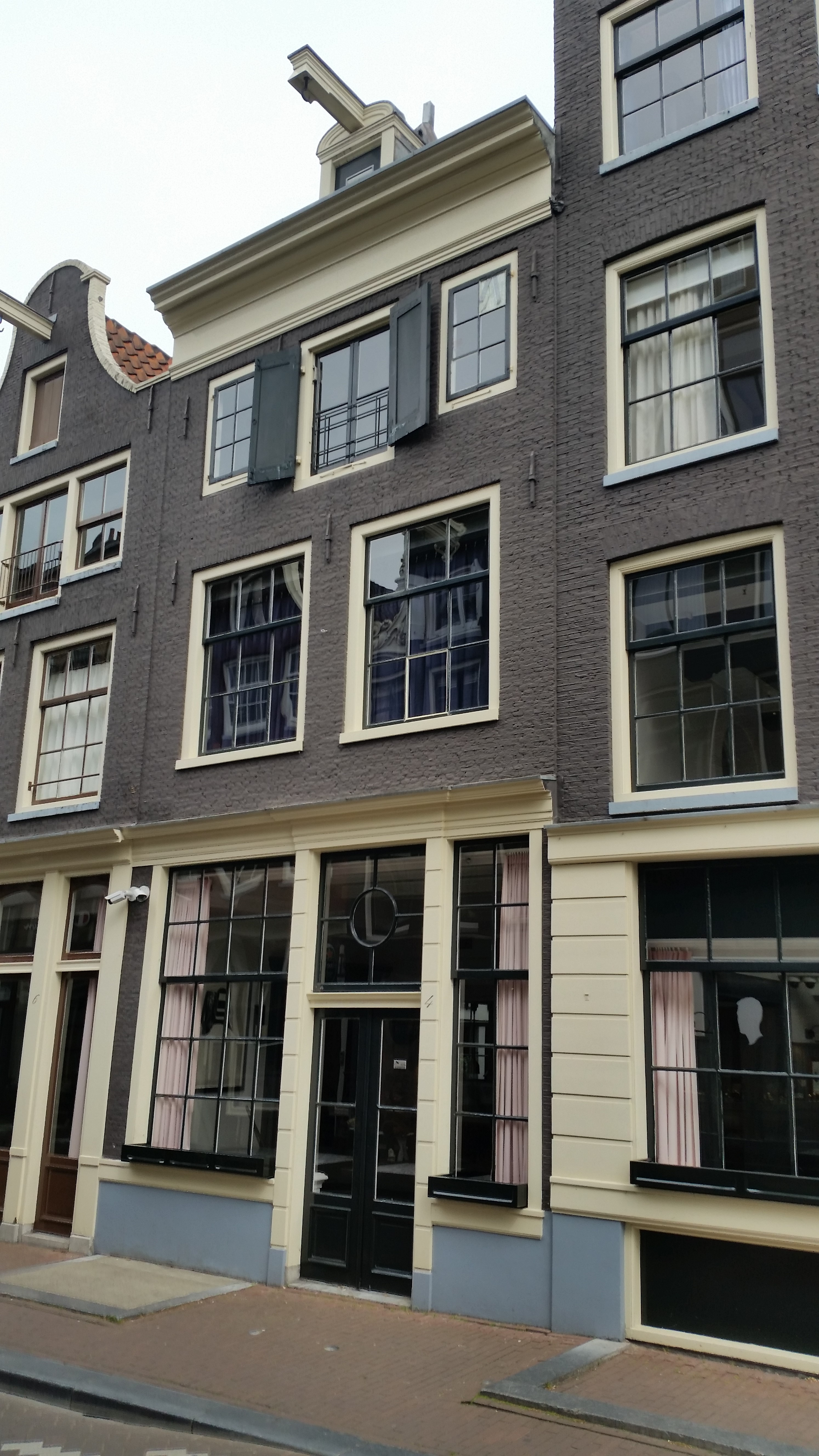
Reestraat 4

== Style ==
Who instructed him is not known, but he may have been a pupil of Philips Wouwerman as his works show an influence from Wouwerman's landscapes. Lingelbach's skill in painting genre figures is no less accomplished in his depictions of architectural and natural objects. He was often invited to paint the figures and animals within other artists landscape pieces, such as the Dutch master landscape painter, Beerstraten, Meindert Hobbema and Jan van der Heyden. His study of architectural forms came from observing the paintings of another Bamboccianti, Viviano Codazzi, an architectural Vedutisti, or view painter. Lingelbach’s forms were accomplished in there effects of light and spatial accuracy, but much freer than that of Codazzi.

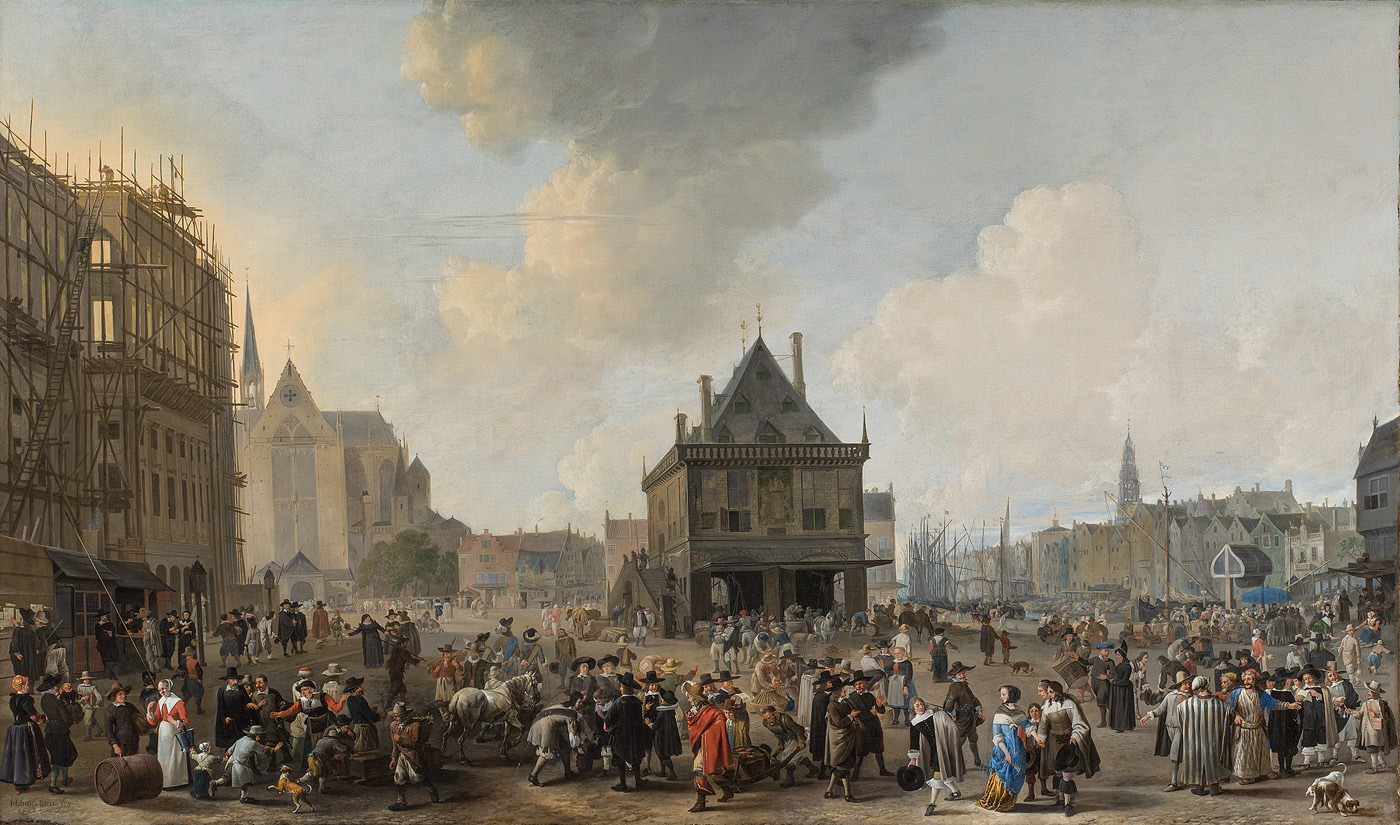
Dam Square (1656) with town hall under construction and Wisselbank to the left

Lingelbach followed the style of the original Bamboccianti, called Il Bamboccio, bringing his own Italianate style into influence of Northern European painters. He is one of the few Dutch painters of the Bamboccianti, whose works are documented in depth, making his influence greater in the progression of the style. Some of his works in Rome were once attributed to Pieter van Laer, but are now rightfully claimed to be Lingelbach’s, such as his, Roman Street Scene with Card Players, (National Gallery). These works show the Italian influence of Caravaggio in their realism and refined chiaroscuro effect, also seen in works such as Lingelbach's, Figures before a Locanda, with a View of the Piazza del Popolo, Rome, (Royal Collection). Lingelbach was buried in the Lutheran Church at Singel.

== Selected works ==
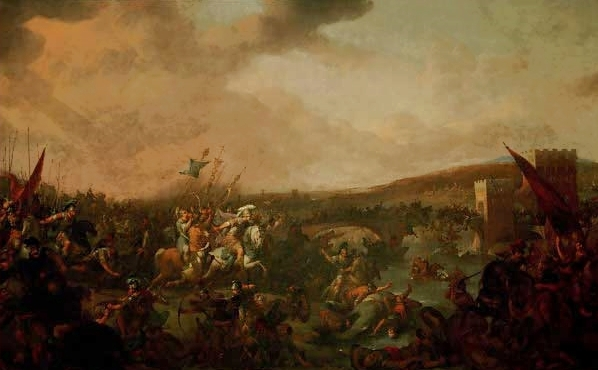
Battle of Milvian Bridge, c. 1650.

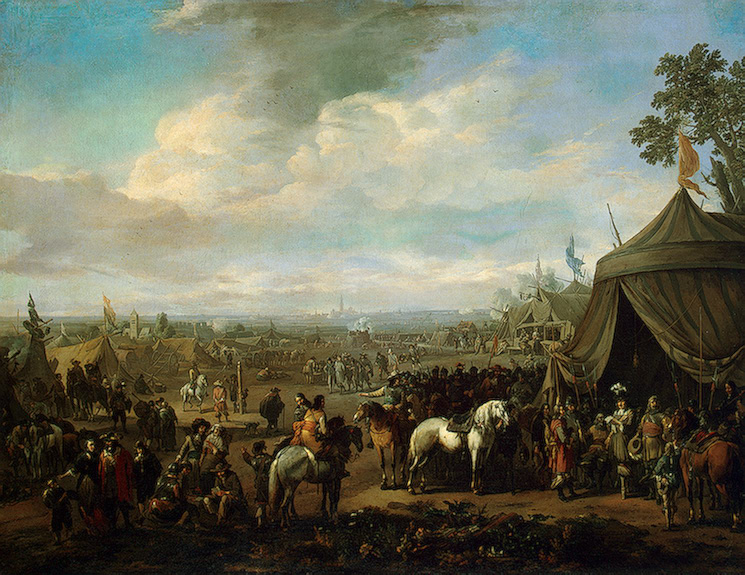
Flemish Town Sieged by the Spanish Soldiers, c. 1674.

- 17th century - Bathing Gypsies, Oil on canvas, (Öffentliche Kunstsammlung, Basel)
- 17th century - A Sea Battle, Oil on canvas, (Private Collection)
- 1640s - Roman Street Scene with Card Players, Oil on canvas, (National Gallery, London)
- 1640s - Figures before a Locanda, with a View of the Piazza del Popolo, Rome, Oil on canvas, (Royal Collection, London)
- c. 1650 - Battle of Milvian Bridge
- 1650 - The Blacksmith, (Private Collection)
- 1650 - Self-portrait with Violin, (Zurich)
- 1651 - Dentist on Horseback, (Rijksmuseum, Amsterdam)
- 1651 - Peasants Dancing, Oil on canvas, (Metropolitan Museum of Art, New York City)
- 1652 - Battle Scene, Oil on panel, (Getty Museum, Los Angeles)
- 1653 - Roman Market Scene, Oil on canvas, (Royal Museums of Fine Arts, Belgium)
- 1660s - Deer Hunt, Oil on canvas, (Hermitage Museum, Saint Petersburg)
- 1660 - The Piazza del Popolo, Rome, Oil on canvas, (Minneapolis Institute of Arts, Minneapolis)
- 1664 - Peasants loading a Hay Cart, Oil on canvas, (National Gallery, London)
- 1671 - Battle Scene, Oil on canvas, (Metropolitan Museum of Art, New York City)
- 1674 - Flemish Town Sieged by the Spanish Soldiers, Oil on canvas, (Hermitage Museum, Saint Petersburg)
- Imaginary Harbor, oil on canvas, John and Mable Ringling Museum of Art, Sarasota, Florida
- 17th Century Mediterranean Harbor Scene, Städel Art Museum Frankfurt, Germany
