= Postjesbuurt =

- Neighbourhood of Amsterdam
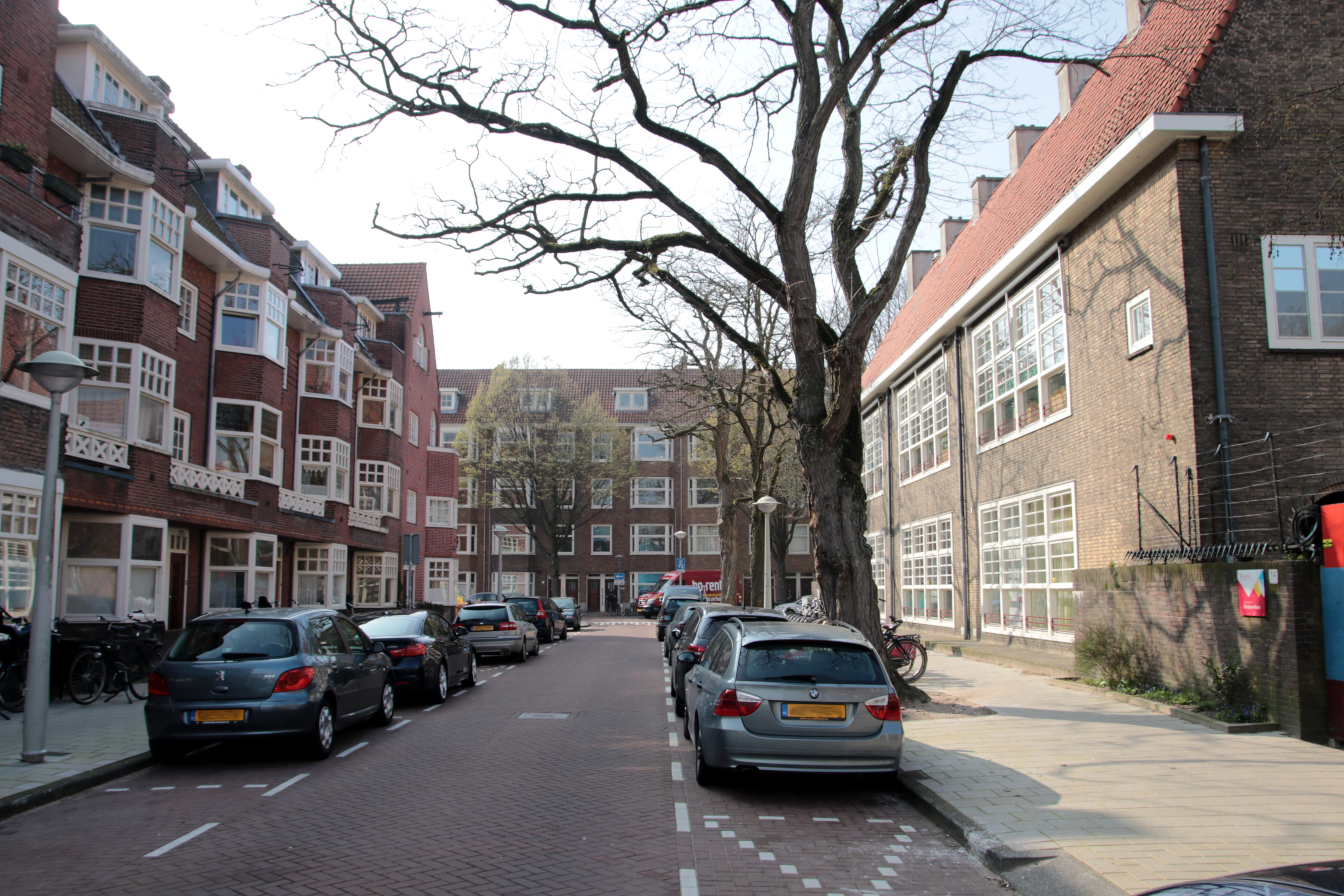
- Arubastraat in 2019

- Location (red) in Amsterdam
- Country: Netherlands
- Province: North Holland
- Municipality: Amsterdam
- Borough: Amsterdam-West
- Time zone: UTC+1 (CET)
  - Summer (DST): UTC+2 (CEST)

Postjesbuurt (Dutch pronunciation: [ˈpɔstɕəzˌbyːrt]) or Westindische buurt (Dutch pronunciation: [ˈʋɛst.ɪndisəˌbyːrt]) is a neighbourhood in Amsterdam, Netherlands. Since 2010, it is part of the district of De Baarsjes and the borough of Amsterdam-West.

The boundaries of the neighbourhood are Postjeswetering in the west and north, Kostverlorenvaart in the east, and Surinameplein in the south.
