= Kinkerbuurt =

Coordinates: 52°22′01″N 4°51′54″E

Kinkerbuurt Oud-West
- Neighborhood of Amsterdam
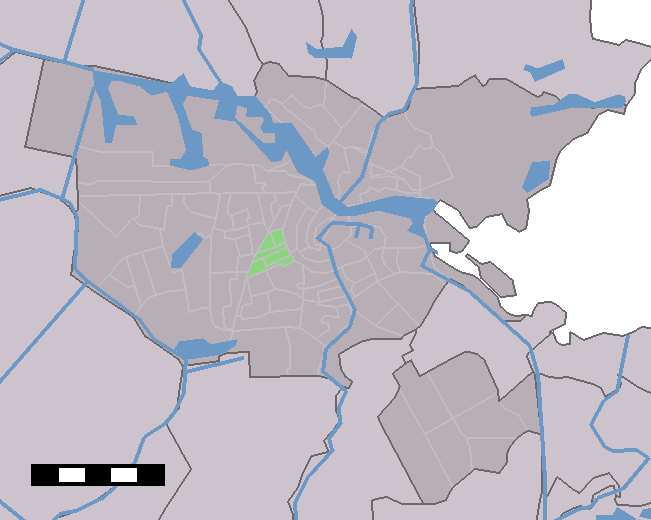
- Country: Netherlands
- Province: North Holland
- COROP: Amsterdam
- Borough: West
- Time zone: UTC+1 (CET)

Kinkerbuurt (Dutch pronunciation: [ˈkɪŋkərˌbyːrt]) is a neighborhood in Amsterdam, Netherlands. Along with the Overtoombuurt, it is part of the neighborhood of Oud-West in the borough of Amsterdam-West. It was built at the beginning of the twentieth century when Amsterdam was being expanded. Kinkerstraat, the area's main shopping street, was named after Dutch poet and lawyer Johannes Kinker.

The borough administration distinguishes several smaller areas within the Kinkerbuurt: the Bellamybuurt, the Van Lennepbuurt and the Da Costabuurt.

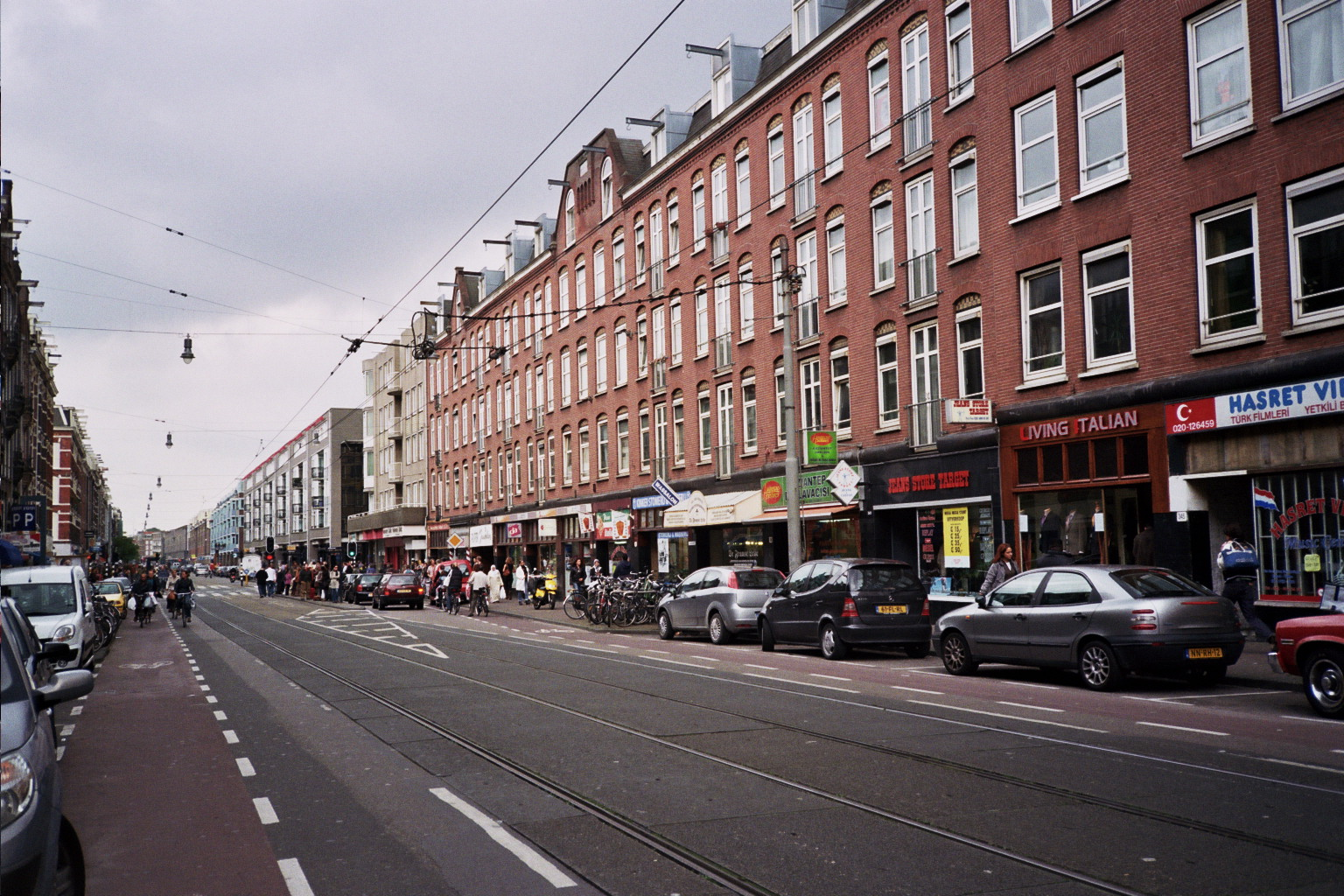
Kinkerstraat

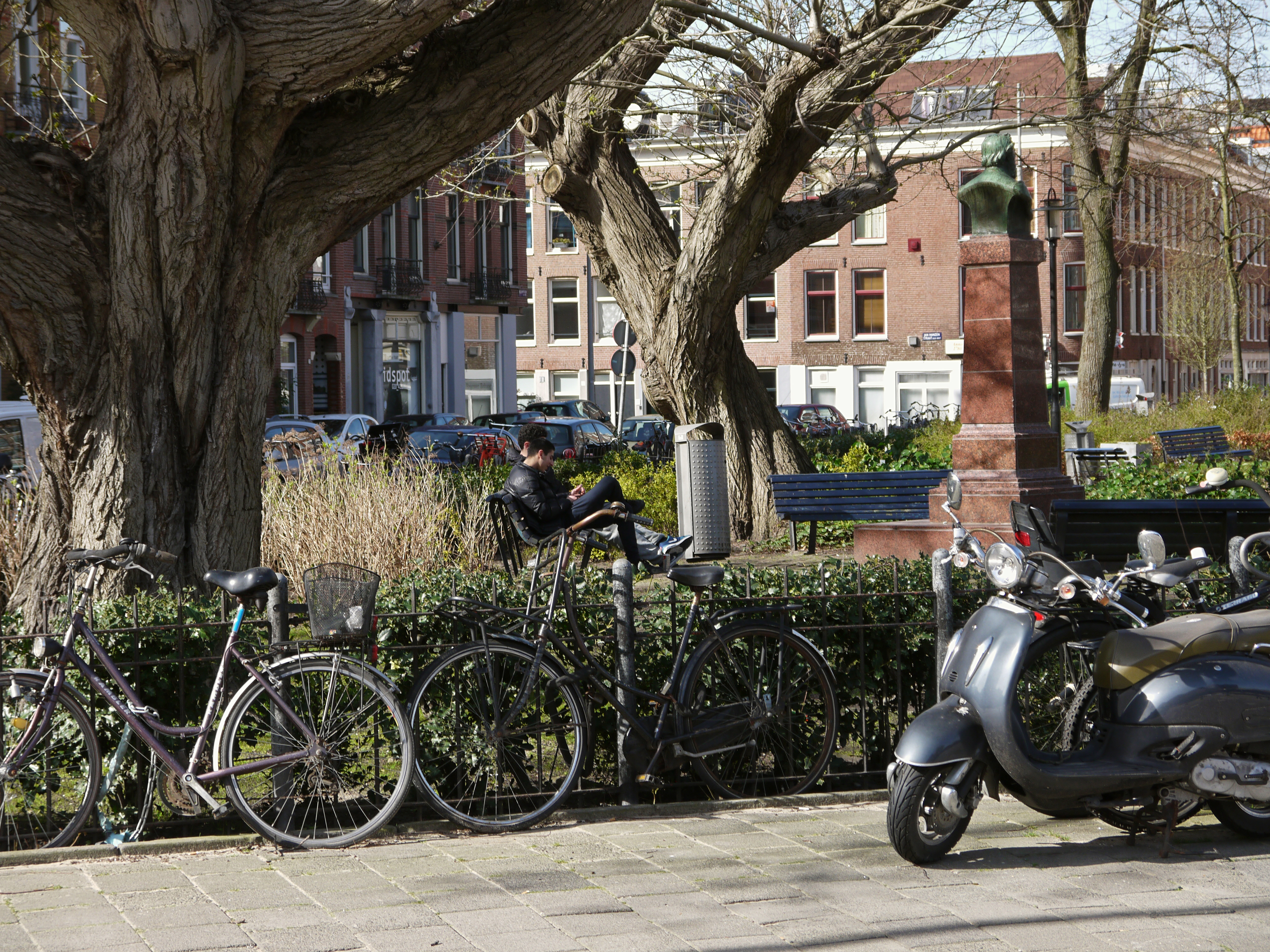
Bellamyplein

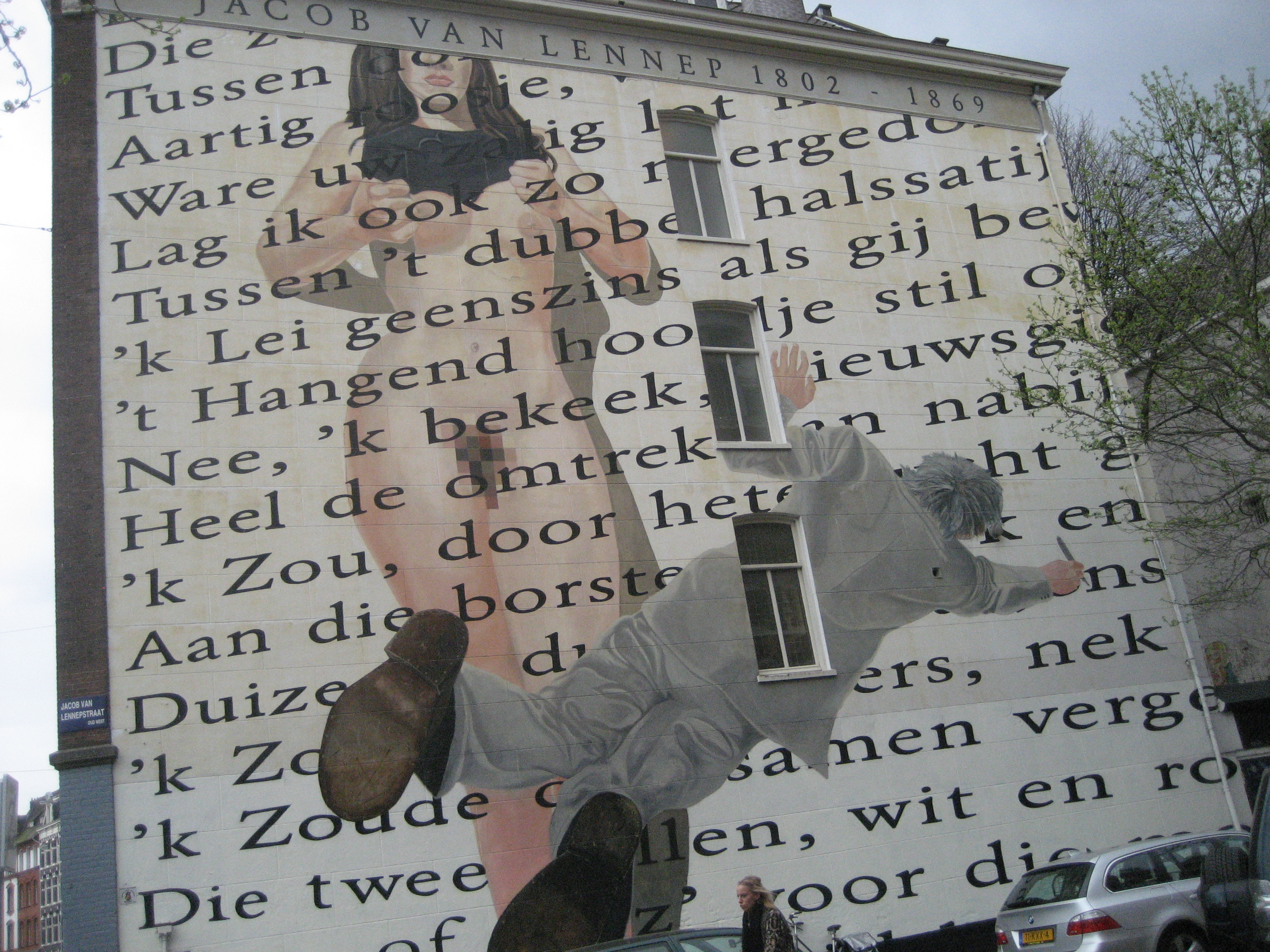
Wall poem by Jacob van Lennep
