= Rozengracht =

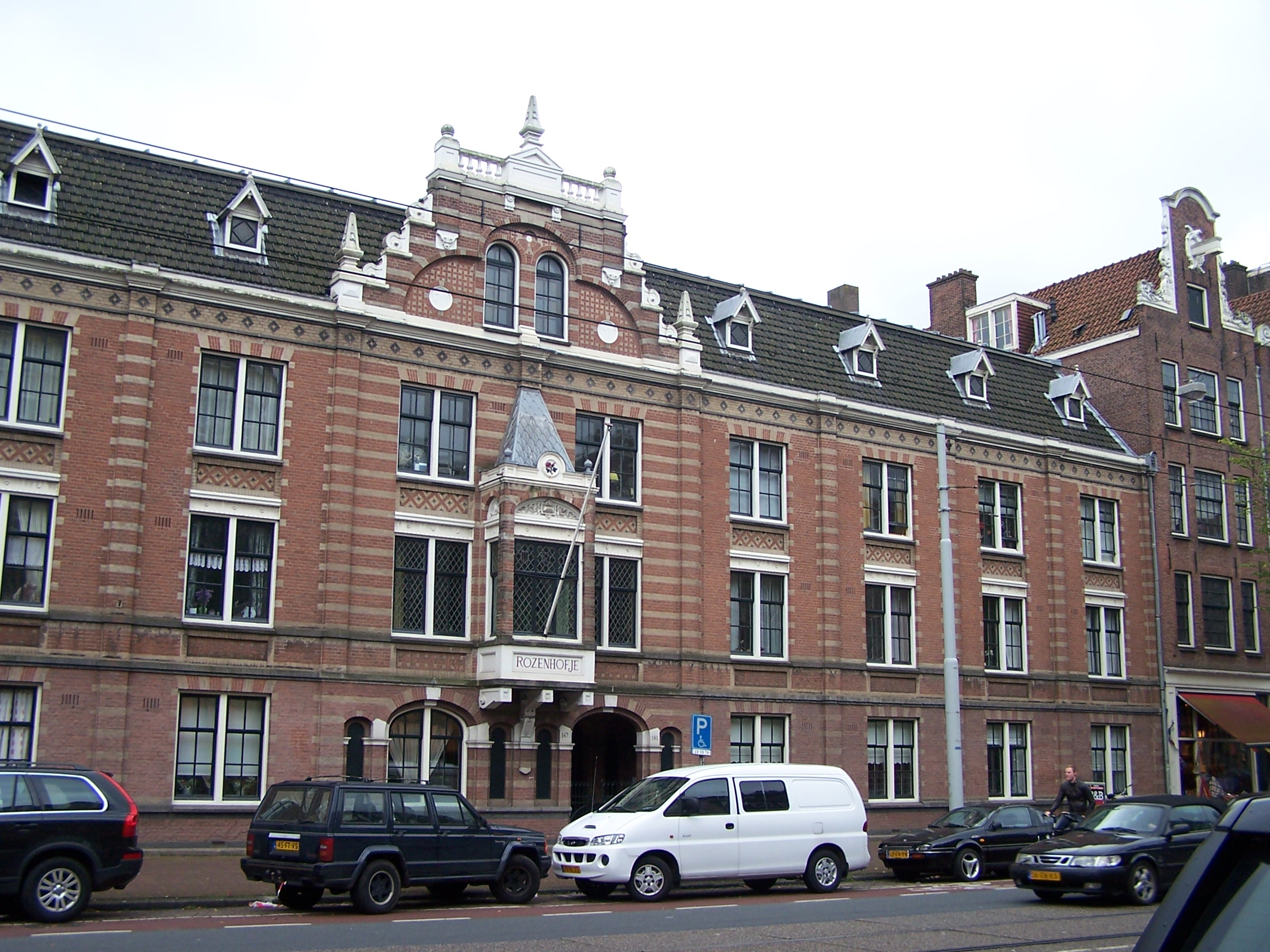
- Rozengracht 147 to 181

- Location of Rozengracht (red)
- Location: Amsterdam
- Postal code: 1016
- Coordinates: 52.373101°N 4.879572°E
- From: Prinsengracht
- To: Singel canal

Construction
- Construction start: 17th century

The Rozengracht is a street in the Jordaan neighbourhood of Amsterdam. It runs between the Prinsengracht at the Westermarkt and the Singelgracht canal at De Clercqstraat. The name means "Rose canal".

The Rozengracht is one of the six former canals in the Jordaan. The reasons for filling in the 17th-century canal in 1890 were poor hygiene from polluted water, and the need for a broad exit road to the new neighborhoods west of the Singel canal. De Clercqstraat was built in 1895 as a westward extension of the Rozengracht. To the east, in the direction of the Dam, the street continues into Raadhuisstraat.

== Famous residents ==
- The painter Rembrandt van Rijn spent his last eleven years of life, from 1658 to 1669, at Rozengracht 184/190.
- The tobacco pipe maker Eduard Bird (c. 1610–65) owned two adjoining houses on the Rozengracht between the two middle bridges.
- Other people who lived on Rozengracht included Meindert Hobbema (opposite Rembrandt), Adam Pynacker, Ludolf Bakhuizen, Jan Abrahamsz Beerstraaten, Jan Gerritsz van Bronckhorst and Johannes Lingelbach.

== Buildings ==
- Club Mazzo was at number 114 from 1980 to 2004.
- The Rozentheater is at Rozengracht 117. It is one of 28 Rijksmonumenten on Rozengracht.
- At Rozengracht 152 the socialist meeting building Constantia became the Roman Catholic church de Zaaier in 1899. The Church of St. Ignatius was erected here in 1929. This became the Fatih Mosque in 1980.
- The former parish house of Jan Roothaan is at Rozengracht 133.
- The buildings of the Rozenhofje, at Rozengracht 147–181, date from 1744, 1790 and 1884. The hofje was home for 55 elderly Protestant women.
- Rozengracht 207–213 is the former building of the De Harmonie (now Megazino), where a protest meeting was held on 4 July 1934 against the reduction of support payments for the unemployed; this was the start of the Jordaan riot .
- From 1952 to 1983, the Netherlands Institute of Industry and Technology was located in a former school building on the north-western corner with Marnixstraat .

== Trams ==
The first tram drove the Dam – Bilderdijkstraat route in 1896. This horse tram line was extended in 1900 to Eerste Constantijn Huijgensstraat. In 1902 the line was electrified and brought up to standard track width, and became line #3. Two years later, the Amsterdam – Haarlem – Zandvoort tram line was created by the Electrische Spoorweg-Maatschappij (ESM) company on the Raadhuisstraat - Rozengracht - De Clercqstraat route. This line was narrow gauge (1000 mm), while the Amsterdam tram was standard gauge. That is why from 1904 until removal of the Blue Tram to Zandvoort in 1957, there was a dual gauge route between the Spuistraat and the Krommert. The third rail on the Rozengracht was removed in 1973 when track renewal took place.

In addition to tram line 3, the following tram lines appeared: #14 in 1910, #17 in 1913 and #13 in 1921. Line #3 was moved in 1929 to the Frederik Hendrikplantsoen. Line #14 did not operate between 1942 and 1982. Line #17 was removed in 1956. After the Blue Tram was removed on 31 August 1957, only line #13 was left, and the municipality planned to remove that line and to try out a tram-free radial road to the city center. However, line #13 remained in service. Line #17 reopened from 1962. Lines 6 and 20 ran in later years for short time on this route.

In addition to trams, Rozengracht was also a busy bus route. In 1986, for example, in addition to three tram lines, there were two city bus lines and seven regional bus lines. Since 16 July 2018 all bus lines, except night buses, have disappeared and since 22 July 2018 only tram lines 13 and 17 have been running.

== Gallery ==
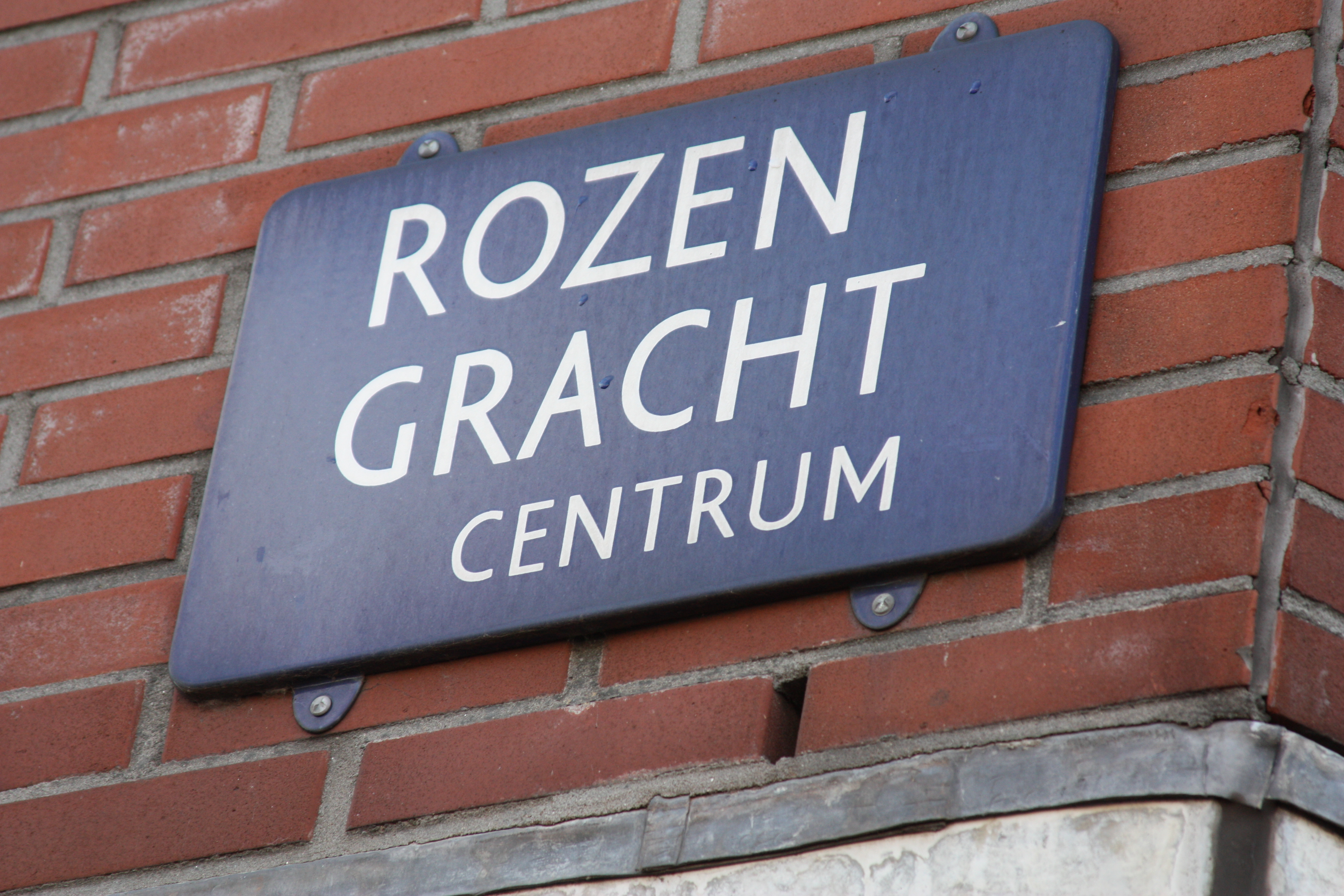
Street sign

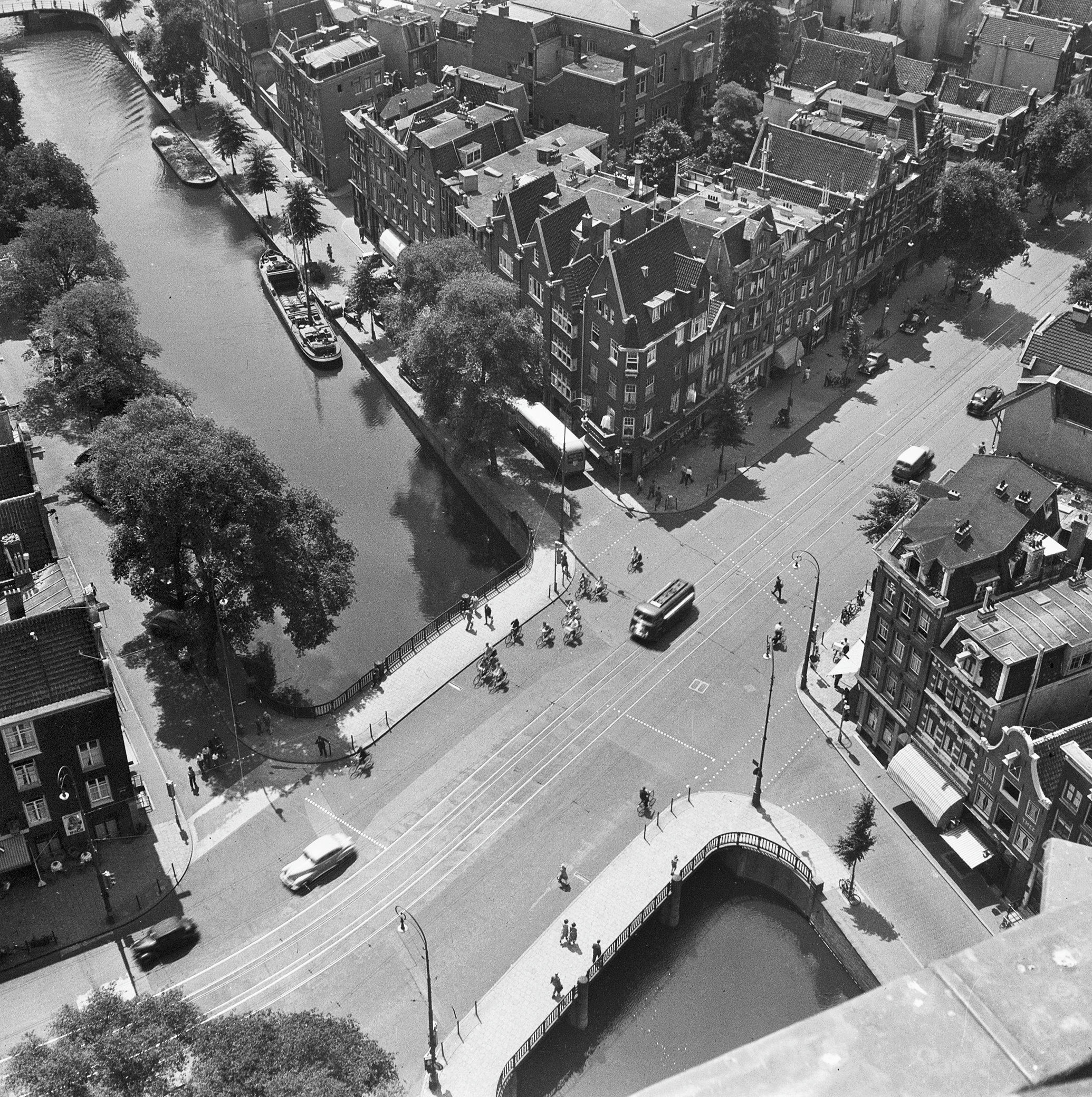
View from the Westertoren over the Prinsengracht and Rozengracht to the southwest, 1954.

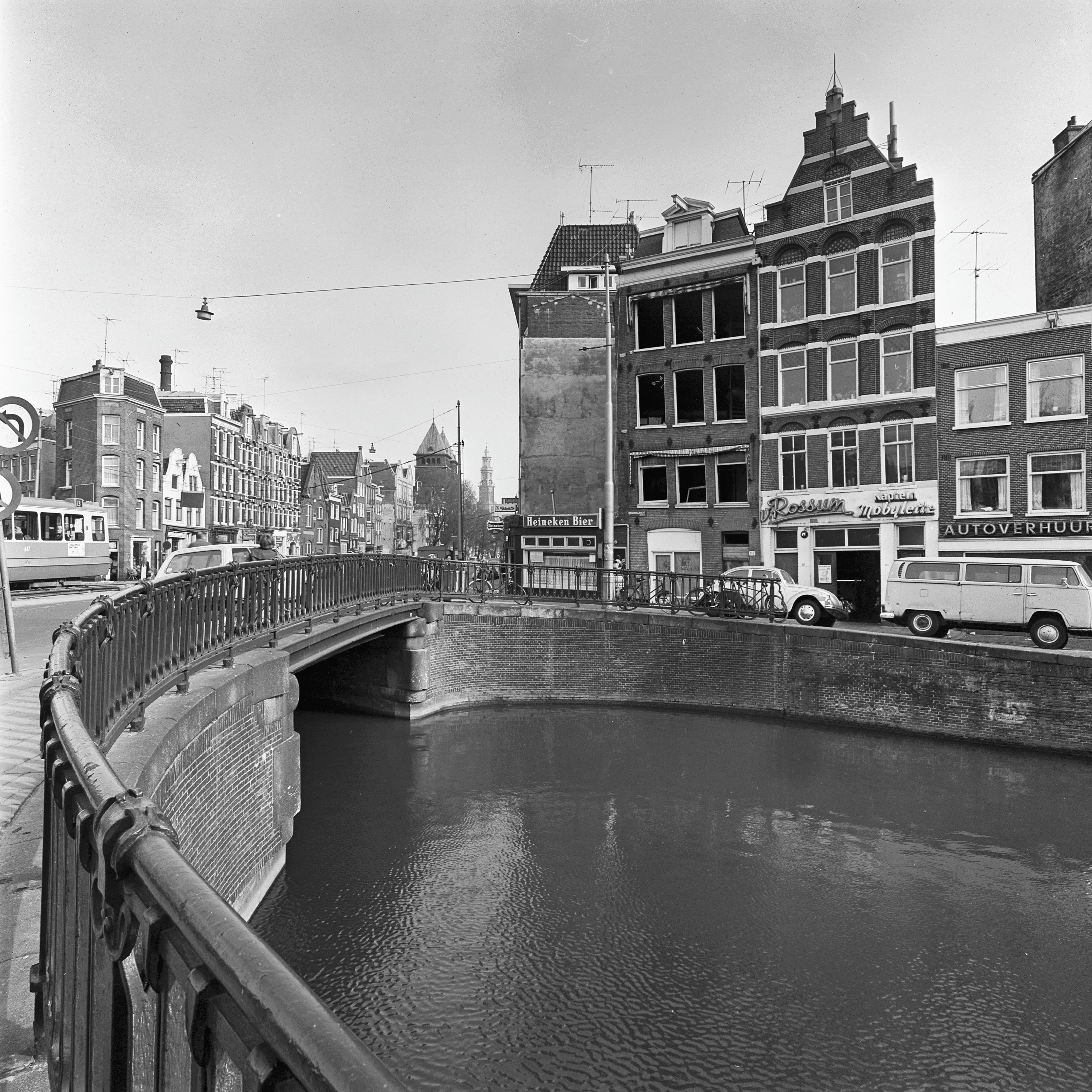
Bridge no. 117, Rozengracht / Lijnbaansgracht.

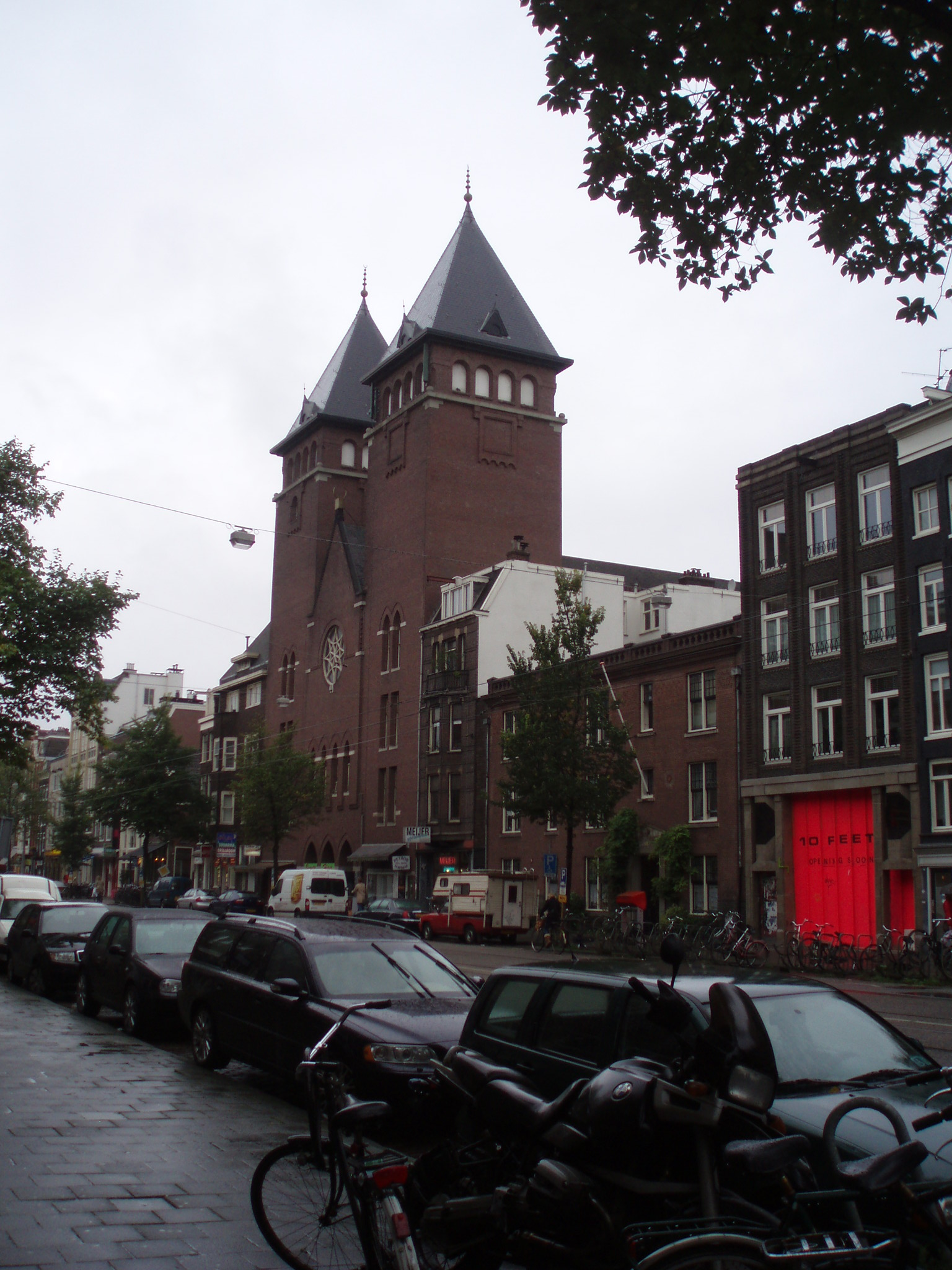
The Fatih mosque on the Rozengracht

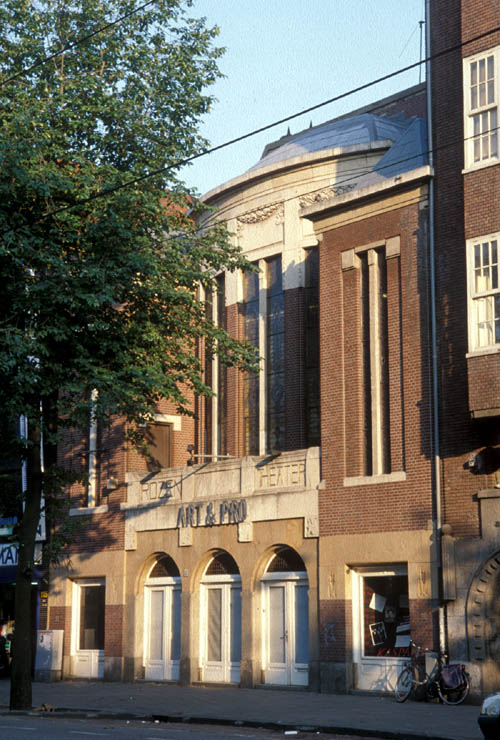
The Rozentheater on the Rozengracht

== See also ==
- List of streets in Amsterdam

== Sources ==
- De Roever, Margriet (1 January 1987), "The Fort Orange "EB" Pipe Bowls", in Blackburn, Roderic H.; Kelley, Nancy A. (eds.), New World Dutch Studies: Dutch Arts and Culture in Colonial America, 1609-1776 : Proceedings of the Symposium, SUNY Press / Albany Institute of History and Art, ISBN 978-0-939072-10-1
