= Admiralenbuurt =

- Neighbourhood
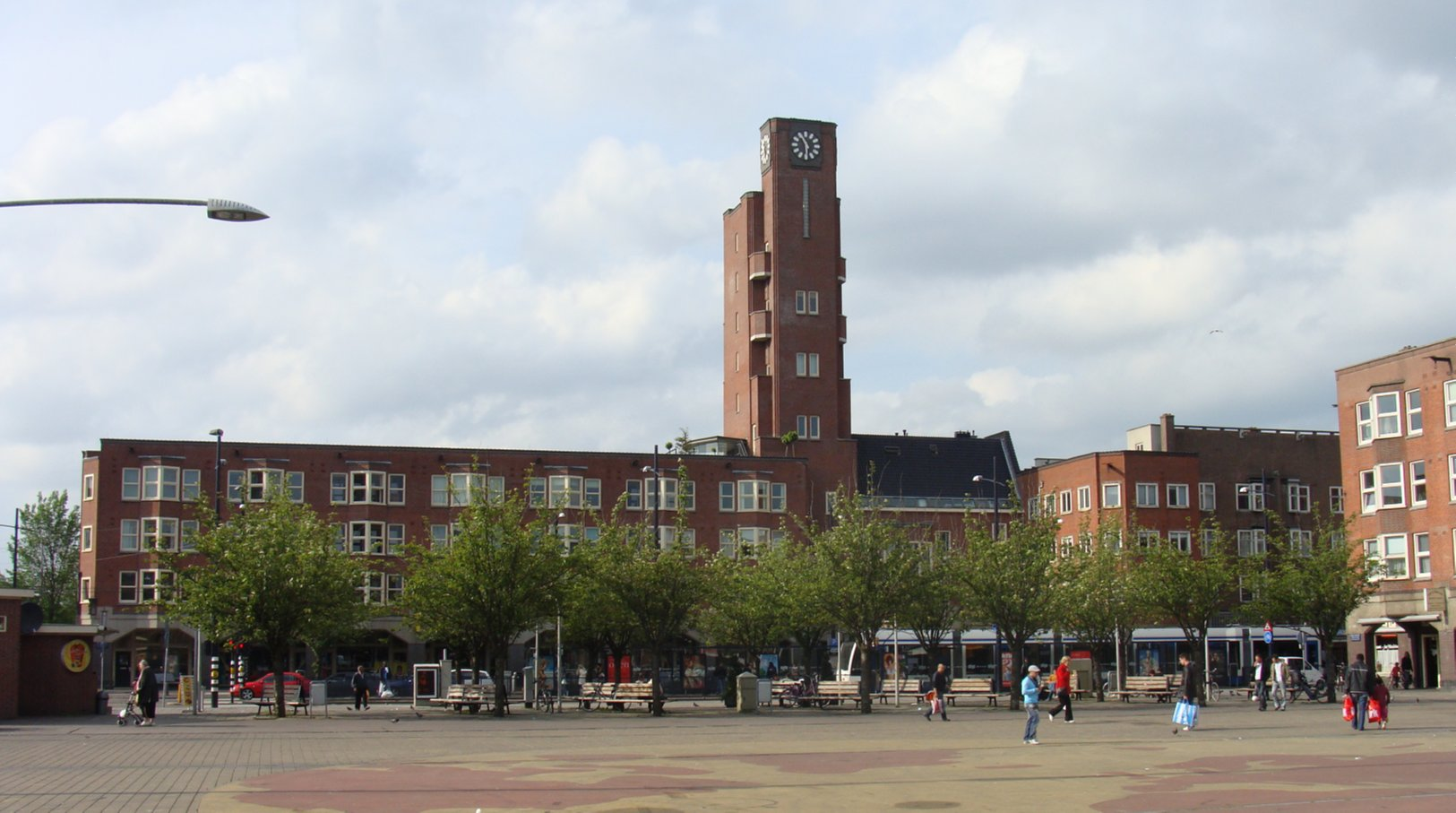
- Mercatorplein

- Location within Amsterdam Location within Netherlands
- Coordinates: 52°22′11.22″N 4°51′10.94″E
- Country: Netherlands
- Province: North Holland
- Municipality: Amsterdam
- Borough: West
- Time zone: CET (UTC+01)
  - Summer (DST): CEST (UTC+02)

Admiralenbuurt (Dutch pronunciation: [ɑtmiˈraːlə(m)ˌbyːrt]) or Mercatorbuurt (Dutch pronunciation: [mɛrˈkaːtɔrˌbyːrt]) is a neighbourhood of the West borough of Amsterdam, Netherlands. It was constructed in the 1920s. The neighbourhood is bisected by the Admiralengracht. From 1990 to 2010, it was part of the borough of De Baarsjes; in 2010, it became part of the borough of Amsterdam-West along with the rest of De Baarsjes.
