= De Clercqstraat =

Street in Amsterdam, the Netherlands

Coordinates: 52.3706°N 4.8697°E

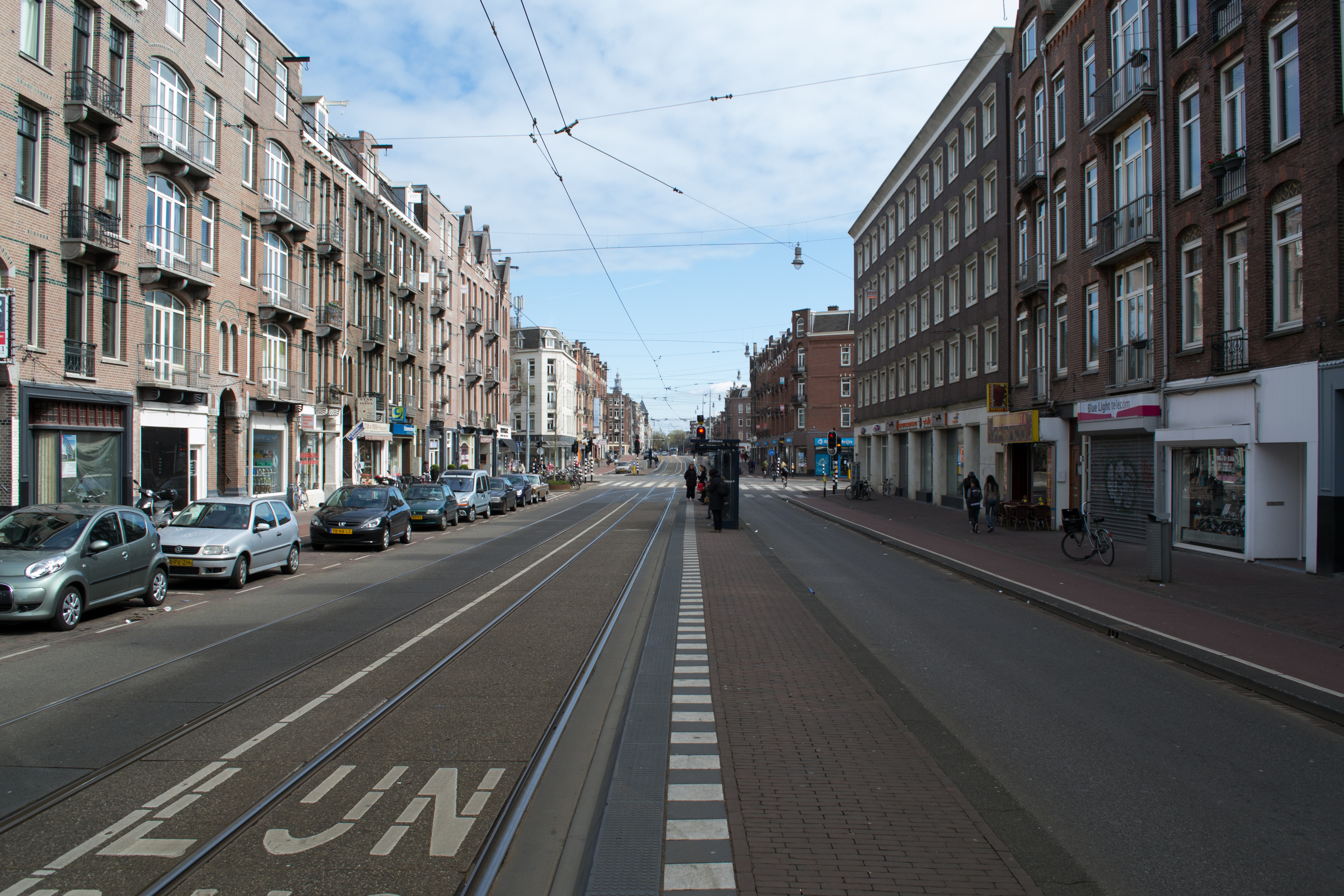
De Clercqstraat, Amsterdam

The De Clercqstraat is a street in Amsterdam-West, Netherlands. It runs between the Singelgracht and Kostverlorenvaart. The street is named after Willem de Clercq (1795–1844), poet and Christian revivalist.

Before construction of the De Clercqstraat at the end of the 19th century, it was the site of a canal, the Lange Bleekerssloot, which was filled in during 1895. The Rozengracht, the extension of De Clercqstraat on the eastern end, was filled in at the same time and a passage towards the Dam, the Raadhuisstraat, was cleared, creating a new axial road connecting the city centre with the newer districts towards the West.

As of September 2025, redevelopment of De Clercqstraat was still ongoing.

== See also ==
- List of streets in Amsterdam
