= Trompbuurt =

- Neighborhood of Amsterdam
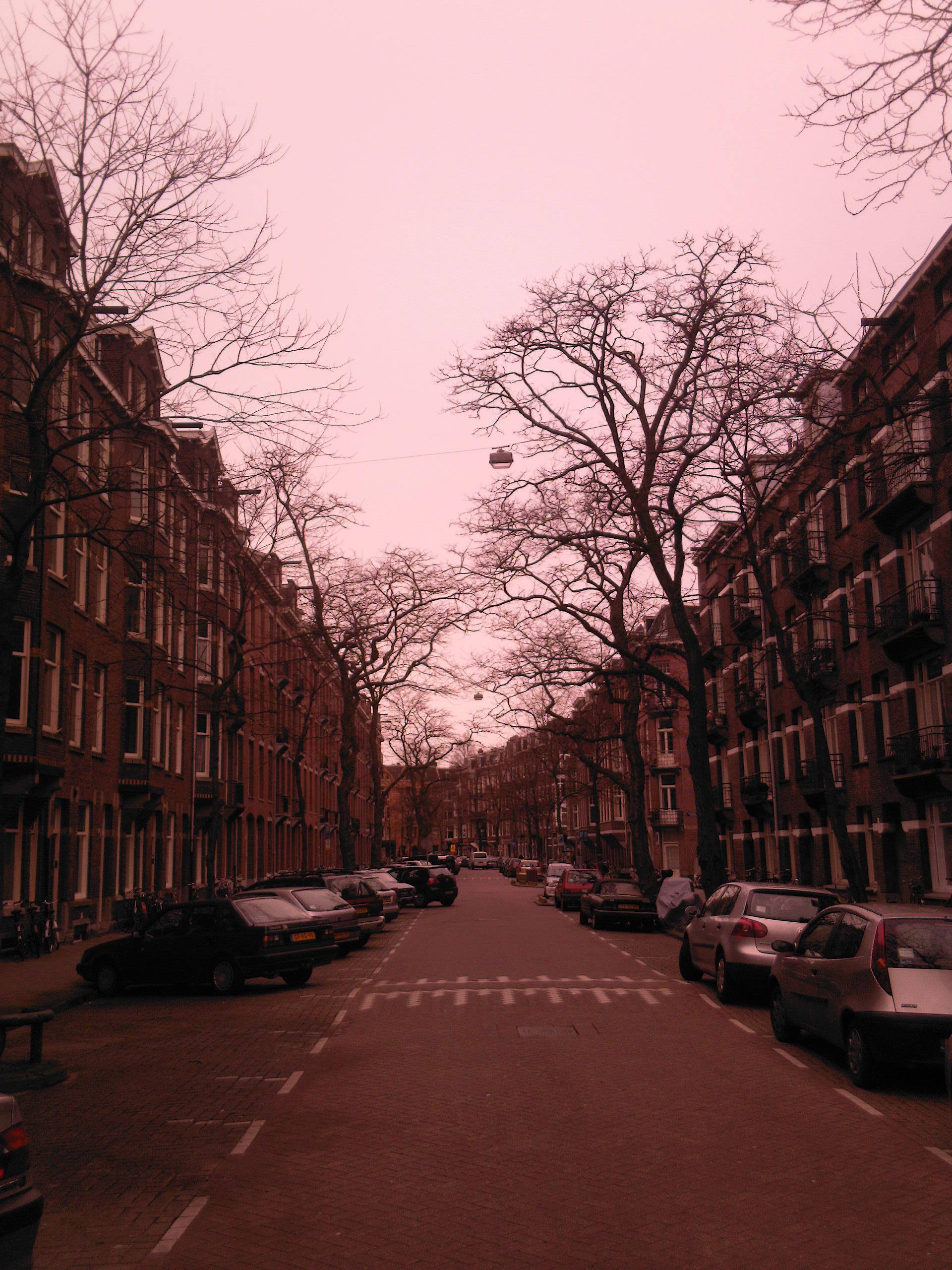
- Trompstraat
- Interactive map of Trompbuurt
- Country: Netherlands
- Province: North Holland
- COROP: Amsterdam
- Time zone: UTC+1 (CET)

Trompbuurt (Dutch pronunciation: [ˈtrɔmbyːrt]) is a neighbourhood of Amsterdam, Netherlands.
