= Chassébuurt =

Neighborhood of Amsterdam, Netherlands

Coordinates: 52.3671°N 4.8645°E

- Neighborhood of Amsterdam
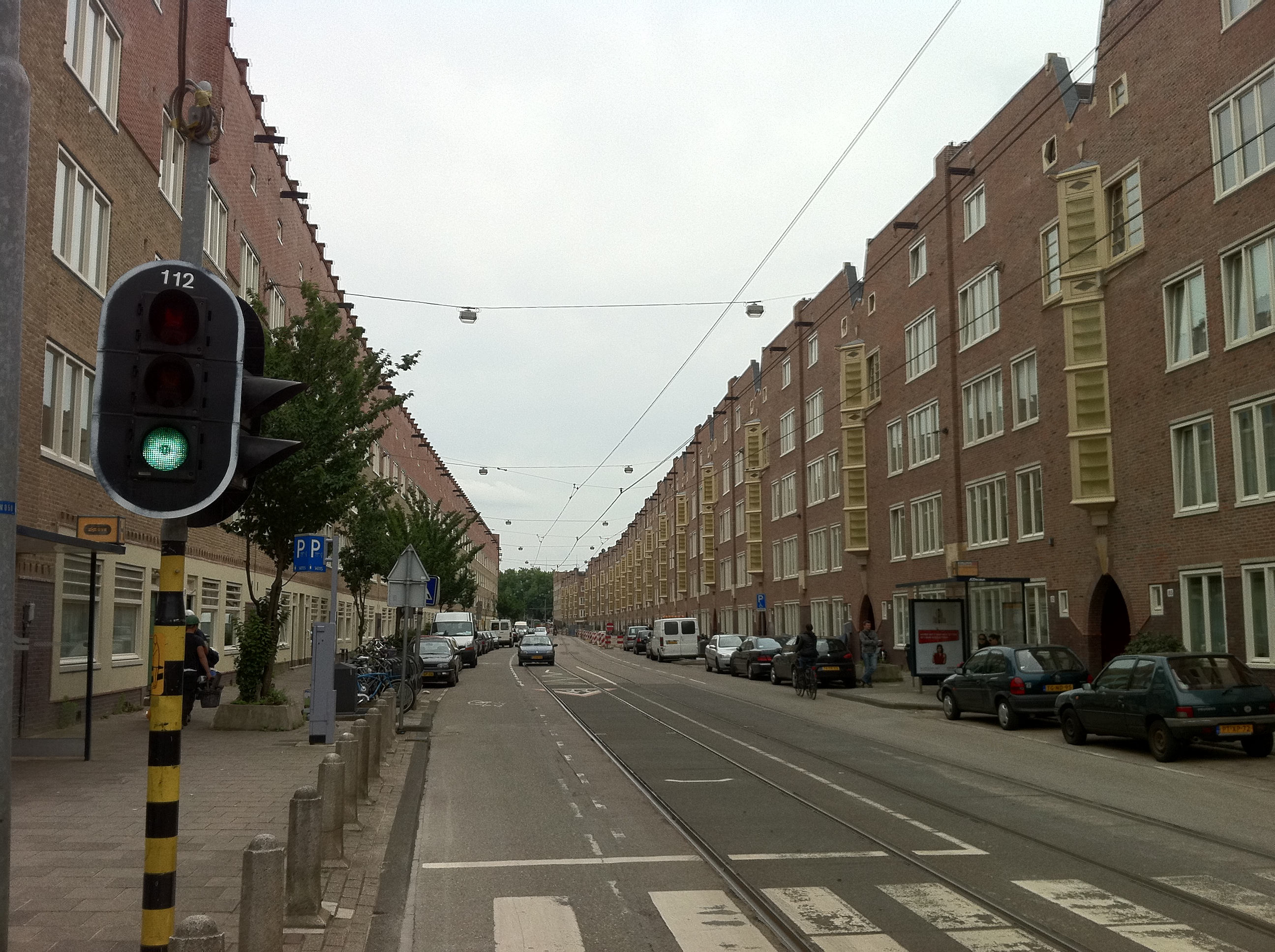
- Witte de Withstraat
- Interactive map of Chassébuurt
- Country: Netherlands
- Province: North Holland
- COROP: Amsterdam
- Time zone: UTC+1 (CET)

Chassébuurt is a neighborhood of Amsterdam, Netherlands.

The district is named for David Hendrik Chassé, a Dutch-born general in Napoleon's army. The Westermoskee is located in the neighborhood.
