= Overtoom =

Overtoom is a surname. Notable people with the surname include:

- Andrew Overtoom, American animation director, writer, photographer, and cinematographer
- Tom Overtoom (born 1990), Dutch footballer
- Willie Overtoom (born 1986), Cameroonian footballer
