= Sloterdijk =

Sloterdijk may refer to:

- Sloterdijk, Amsterdam, a quarter in Amsterdam
  - Amsterdam Sloterdijk station
  - Sloterdijk train collision which occurred nearby
- MV Sloterdyk, a ship of the Holland America Line

== People with the surname ==
- Peter Sloterdijk (born 1947), German philosopher
