= 2026 Utrecht explosions =

Explosions in the Netherlands

- Date: 15 January 2026
- Time: 15:30 (CET)
- Location: Utrecht, Netherlands
- Type: Explosion

On 15 January 2026 at 3:30pm, multiple explosions were reported in the city of Utrecht, Netherlands. Initial reports say one building was destroyed and there have been multiple injuries. Neighbouring buildings have had their roofs blown off and the explosion has left glass on the street. The explosion caused a fire and an emergency hospital was set up in the area.

== Explosions ==
On 15 January 2026, one or more explosions occurred in the Visscherssteeg in the historic city centre of Utrecht at around 15:30 local time, followed by a large fire. The blasts caused significant structural damage, with multiple buildings partially or completely collapsing and surrounding properties sustaining heavy damage. The force of the explosions shattered windows, displaced roof tiles, and scattered debris across nearby streets, prompting authorities to cordon off a wide area.

Emergency services rapidly deployed in large numbers, including firefighters, police, medical teams, and specialized urban search and rescue units. Due to the instability of the damaged buildings and the ongoing fire, responders were initially unable to enter some structures and instead fought the blaze from the outside. Drones and search dogs were used to assess the situation and search for possible victims trapped under rubble, while nearby residents were evacuated and accommodated elsewhere.

At least four people were reported injured, all with minor injuries, and no fatalities were confirmed. Although early reports raised concerns about possible victims trapped beneath collapsed buildings, searches with dogs and rescue teams did not find any casualties under the debris. Authorities later indicated that the most heavily affected buildings were likely unoccupied at the time of the explosions, contributing to the limited number of injuries.

Witnesses described hearing one or more extremely loud blasts, with some reporting that the ground shook and that chaos ensued in the streets immediately afterward. People fled buildings, some injured by shattered glass, while emergency services urged the public to stay away from the area. The fire that followed the explosions produced heavy smoke visible across the city, and it took several hours for firefighters to bring the situation under control.

Initial assessments suggested that a gas leak may have been involved, as a gas odor had been reported in the area prior to the explosions. However, authorities emphasized that the exact cause remained under investigation, and while a criminal act was considered unlikely, it had not been definitively ruled out in the immediate aftermath.

== Aftermath ==
The explosions attracted widespread international media attention, with footage and reports appearing in major global outlets. Images of the fire, destruction, and emergency response were broadcast worldwide, highlighting the scale of the incident and its impact on the historic city center of Utrecht.

In the immediate aftermath of the explosions, significant damage was recorded in the Visscherssteeg area, with one building collapsing and several surrounding structures deemed unsafe. Multiple homes and businesses suffered extensive damage, forcing residents to evacuate. Around twenty people were unable to return to their homes in the weeks following the incident, with some expected to be displaced for months. Temporary accommodation was arranged, and the affected area remained partially closed and under security while investigations and safety assessments continued.

Cleanup and recovery operations began shortly after the incident, including the demolition of buildings that could not be salvaged. By mid-March, local authorities reported that the surrounding streets had largely been reopened to the public. Despite this progress, the material damage to homes and businesses was described as extensive, with reconstruction expected to take considerable time.

Authorities launched multiple investigations into the cause of the explosions. The Dutch Safety Board (Onderzoeksraad voor Veiligheid, OVV) announced a broader inquiry into the risks associated with gas explosions, using the Utrecht incident as a case study alongside similar events elsewhere in the Netherlands. At the same time, the Public Prosecution Service continued its own investigation, and officials stated that it had not yet been definitively established whether the explosion was caused by a gas leak, although this was considered a likely scenario by experts and network operators.

The emergency response to the disaster was later described as highly coordinated, with multiple emergency call centers handling a surge in emergency calls and distributing workload across the national system. Authorities scaled up response levels rapidly, deploying additional emergency units, medical teams, and logistical support. The intensity of the initial response gradually subsided after several hours, as the situation came under control and a clearer overview of the incident was established.
