= Aircraft Incident Management Procedure (Netherlands) =

An Aircraft Incident Management Procedure (Dutch: Vliegtuigongevalscenario or VOS) is a Dutch standard Incident Management Procedure for incidents at or near airports involving one or more aircraft. This is the aviation specific Coordinated Regional Incident Management Procedure or CRIMP (Dutch: Gecoördineerde Regionale Incidentbestrijdings Procedure) or GRIP. A VOS arranges the amount of emergency services and support by air-side and/or land-side operations of the airport. There are some small differences in naming the VOS at the respective airports in the Netherlands, but the incident management is generally the same.

== Schiphol ==
At Amsterdam Airport Schiphol there are seven stages of aircraft incident management: VOS 1 to VOS 7. In this case VOS means Vliegtuig Ongeval Schiphol (Schiphol Aircraft Incident Procedure). The number designates the complexity of the alarm generated by the aircraft captain or first officer. The GRIP number gives the corresponding CRIMP level by the national emergency services (police, fire and rescue and ambulance services)

VOS #	Emergency situation	corresponding GRIP level
1	Pan-pan call, a general warning issued by the captain or first officer that there is something wrong	No corresponding GRIP level
2	Mayday call, less than 50 people on board (pob)	GRIP 2
3	Mayday call 50-250 pob	GRIP 2
4	Mayday call 250 or more pob	GRIP 2
5	Crash call, less than 50 pob	GRIP 3
6	Crash call, 50-250 pob	GRIP 3
7	Crash call, 250 or more pob	GRIP 3
