= 2017 fipronil eggs contamination =

Food contamination event in Europe and Asia

- Fipronil
- Location: European Economic Area (EEA), South Korea, Hong Kong and Taiwan
- Cause: Insecticide used inside Dutch poultry farms

The 2017 fipronil eggs contamination is an incident in Europe and Asia involving the spread of fipronil insecticide which contaminated human-consumed chicken eggs and egg products.

== History ==
=== Issue ===
Chicken eggs were found to contain fipronil and distributed to 15 European Union countries, Switzerland, and Hong Kong. Approximately 700,000 eggs are thought to have reached shelves in the UK alone. Fipronil contaminated eggs may have been sold for a long time prior to the discovery of high levels. Fipronil was used in a remedy to destroy the poultry mite.

=== Initial actions ===
Authorities in the Netherlands were alerted by an anonymous source in November 2016 that fipronil was being used in poultry farms, but failed to communicate the findings. In July/August 2017 millions of chicken eggs were blocked from sale or withdrawn from the market in the Netherlands, Belgium, Germany and France after elevated levels of fipronil were discovered by the Dutch food and product safety board. About 180 Dutch farms were temporarily shut down. In early August, Aldi reported removing all eggs for sale in their German stores as a precaution.

=== Investigations ===
Because the use of fipronil is illegal in the production of food for human consumption in Europe, a criminal investigation was initiated.

Early investigation led to two companies: ChickFriend, a provider of pest control services in the Netherlands, suspected of knowingly using and selling DEGA-16 mixed with fipronil to hundreds of chicken farmers, and Poultry Vision in Belgium, accused of selling DEGA-16 mixed with fipronil to ChickFriend. DEGA-16 is a cleaning and sanitising natural product that is approved to clean chicken stables. The Dutch owners of ChickFriend were arrested during a large scale operation conducted by Dutch law enforcement agencies on 10 August. The first results of an investigation by Belgian police led to the discovery of 6 cubic metres (210 cu ft) of fipronil that Poultry Vision had imported from a chemical manufacturing company in Romania.

The Dutch Safety Board announced on 8 August 2017 that an official investigation has been initiated. On 21 April 2021 the two main suspects were each sentenced to one year incarceration.

In South Korea, authorities found fipronil-contaminated eggs, which were produced in Namyangju, on 14 August 2017. E-mart, Homeplus, and Lotte Mart stopped selling eggs temporarily on the same day.

Scientific tests carried in Germany on imported eggs to Malta found that eight of twenty had traces of fipronil, and the Maltese were informed to take measures in limiting the consumption to not more than two eggs per day.

== Reported fipronil concentrations ==
The maximum residue limit (MRL) of fipronil in eggs is set at the detection limit of 0.005 mg/kg within the European Union, as is outlined in Regulation (EC) No 396/2005 of the European Parliament and of the Council of 23 February 2005. Fipronil is classed as a WHO Class II moderately hazardous pesticide, and has a rat acute oral LD50 of 97 mg/kg.

The Dutch food and product safety board (NVWA) reported that the test results of one batch of eggs originating from one poultry farm in the Netherlands exceeded the threshold of 0.72 mg/kg. Eggs containing fipronil values above this threshold could have possible negative health effects.
