= Westerpark (park) =

Park in Amsterdam, the Netherlands

Coordinates: 52°23′10″N 4°52′39″E

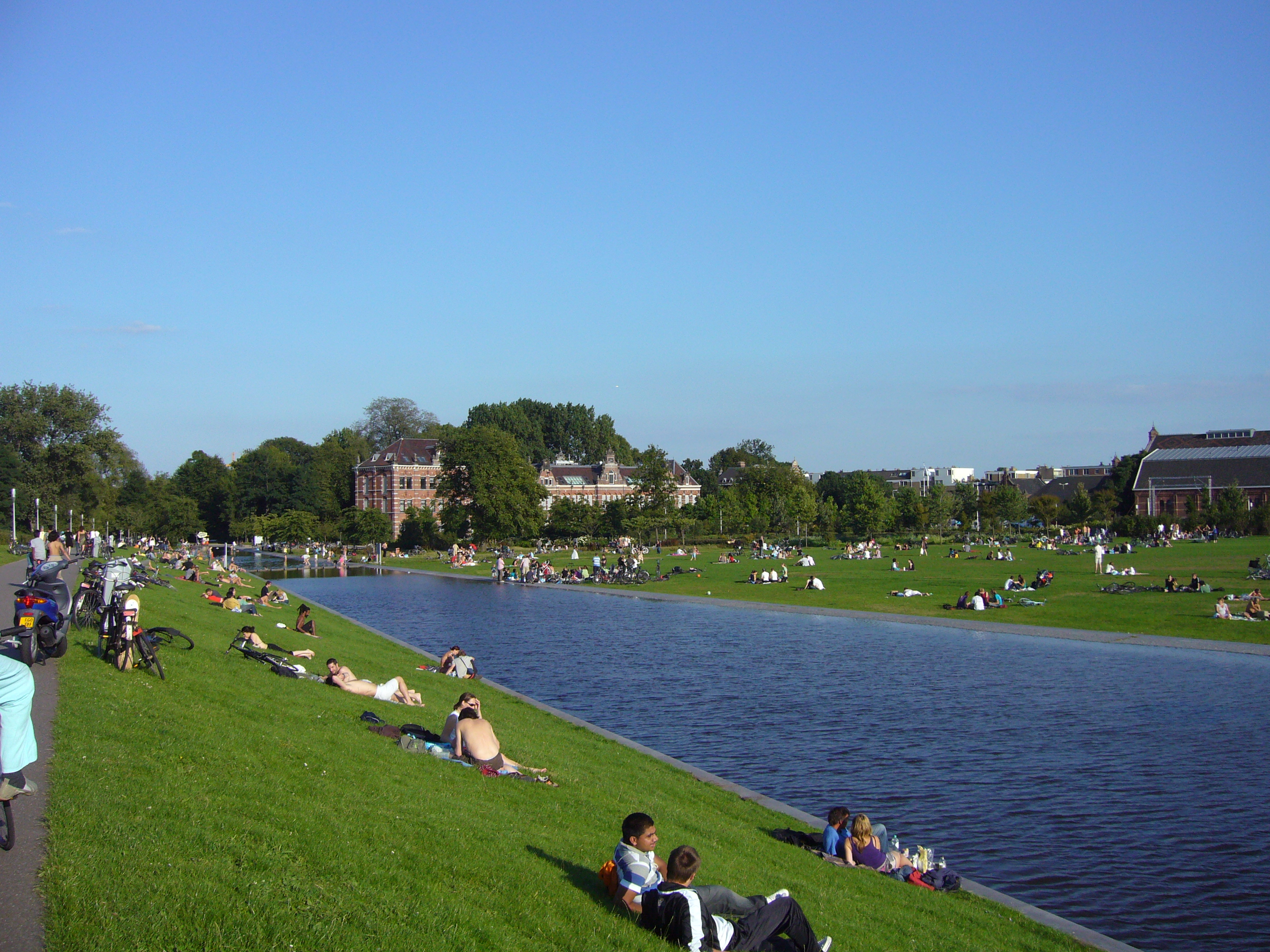
- The park in 2008
- Interactive map of Westerpark
- Type: Urban park
- Location: Amsterdam-West, Amsterdam, Netherlands
- Status: Open all year

The Westerpark (English: Western Park) is a public urban park in Amsterdam, Netherlands. The former borough (stadsdeel) of Westerpark is named after the park, as is the current neighborhood.

The verdant space of the former Westergasfabriek gasworks along Haarlemmerweg has become a place for cultural avant-garde businesses and events.

== History ==
=== From Westerplantsoen to Westerpark ===
Up until the early seventeenth century, the Haarlemmerdijk (also called Spaarndammerdijk) constitutes the only connection between Haarlem and Amsterdam. The dike serves as protection against the IJ, but is subject to breakthroughs and floods. At the north of the dike lies a polder, which is the location of today's Westerpark. Its name, Overbraker Binnenpolder, probably refers to its frequent floods. A few farms are built along this dike between Amsterdam and Sloterdijk, then the first village on the road to Haarlem.

In the mid-19th century, Amsterdam struggles with the consequences of the Industrial revolution and the growth of its population. The increasing pollution and deteriorating hygiene conditions lead the city to consider the creation of parks and gardens around the city center. In 1845, Amsterdam's first municipal park, the Westerplantsoen (Western Garden), is created on the Overbraker Binnenpolder.

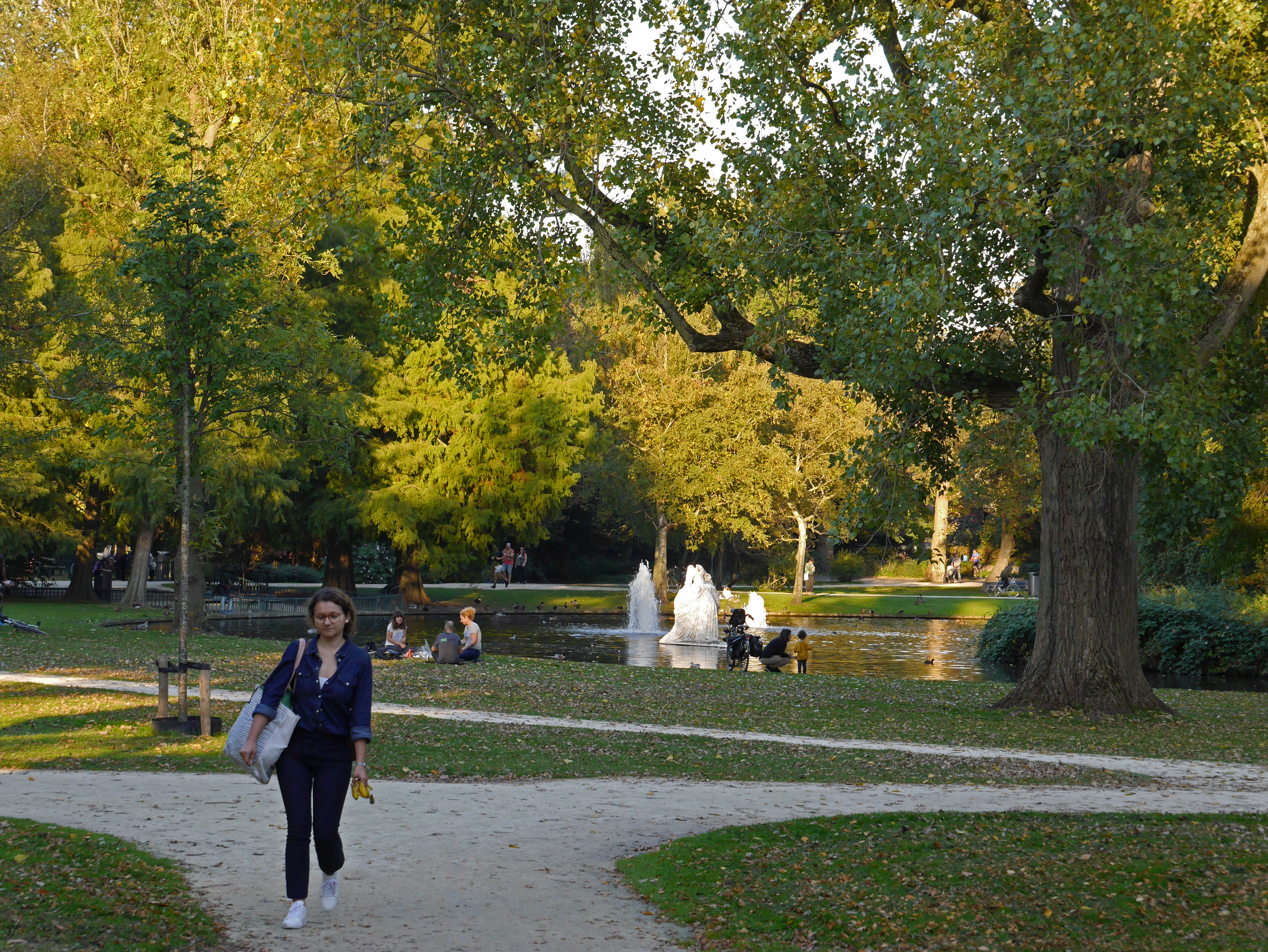
The park in 2018

This first park is appreciated by the local population. Ton Heijdra notes:

There is enthusiasm for this new park, especially in the summer when it hosts theater performances. When they are thirsty, people can enjoy the Welgelegen tavern, on the Bogt stronghold, in the middle of the park. Welgelegen has a leafy garden and a music temple where performances are often held.

The experience, however, is short-lived: in 1869, the park is eliminated to make way for the railroads and canals, most notably the Westerkanaal that connects the Singelgracht and the Haarlemmertrekvaart to the IJ.

=== Conception of the park ===
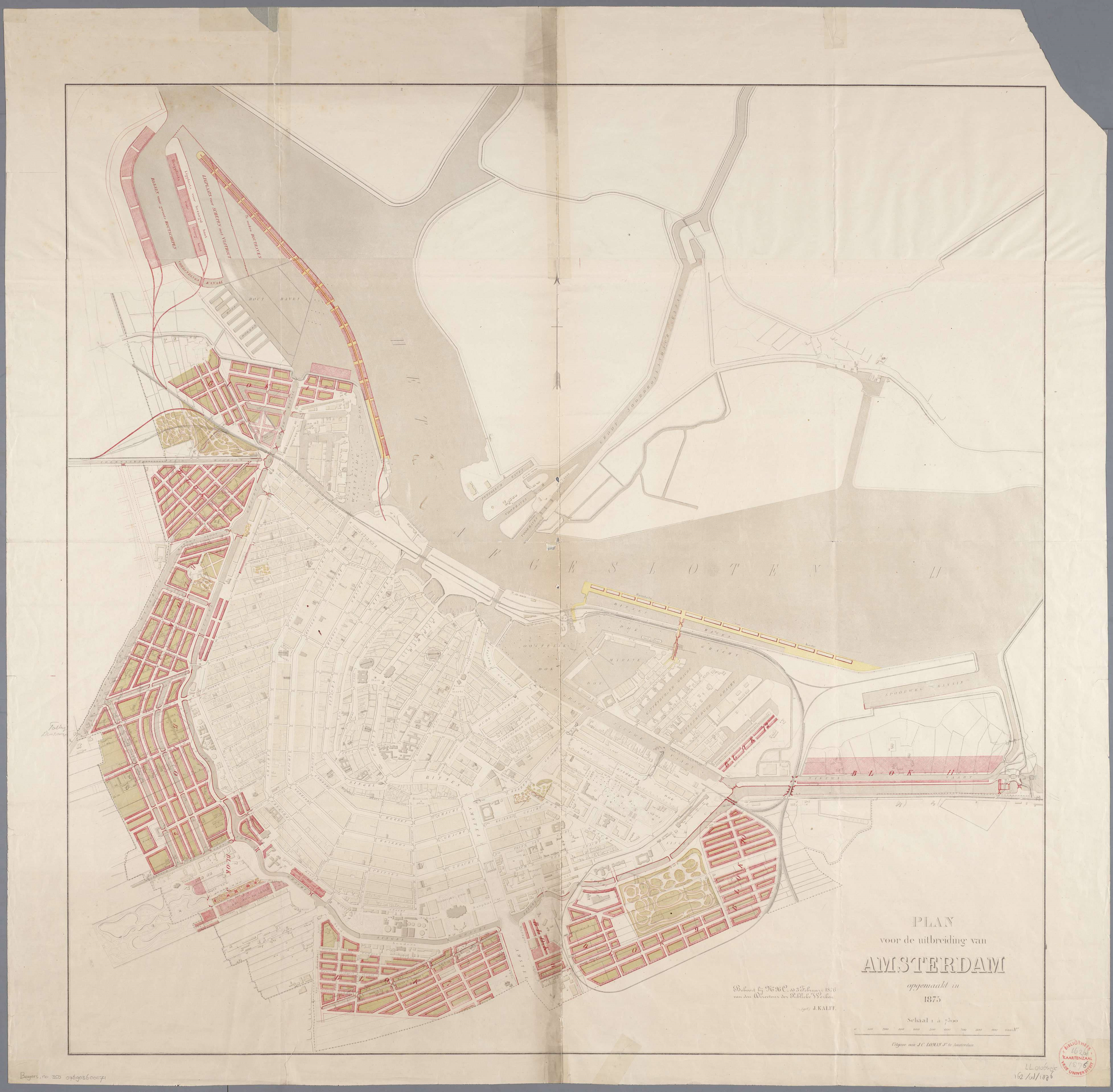
Jan Kalff's 1875 Expansion plan

In October 1866, city engineer Jacob van Niftrik submitted his expansion plan for Amsterdam to the alderman for Public Works. This plan recommends the creation of several major parks around the city, but does not include the future Westerpark.

This plan is deemed too ambitious and costly and is rejected by the city council. As a result, the city's director of works, Jan Kalff, is asked to propose a more pragmatic plan, that would "synthesize developments that were underway, rather than steer developments itself".

At that time, the plan for a major extension of Amsterdam, primarily meant for the elite, had given way to a more moderate plan, drawn up by J. Kalff, who also made room for the middle class and even labourers. At the fringes of the belt, on space not suitable for the construction of houses, he designed two parks - the Oosterpark (East park) and the Westerpark (West park).

The original Westerpark is designed in 1890 by landscape architect Leonard Springer. While Westerpark was initially meant to be larger (around 10 hectares), its area is limited by the decision of the city to set up a gas plant, limiting its area to 5.63 hectares.

=== Construction of the Westergasfabriek ===
In 1883, the city grants a concession to the Imperial Continental Gas Association to create a plant that would produce town gas for street lighting. The buildings are designed by architect Isaac Gosschalk in the then-popular Dutch neo-renaissance style under the supervision of J. Pazzani, director of the new gas plant, who would decide on the location of the various buildings. This collaboration was intended to create a complex that would be both functional and aesthetically pleasing.

At the time, the site includes several coal storage areas, treatment plants and office buildings that stands in a U-shape around an imposing water tower:

The site was designed as follows: two treatment buildings were built parallel to the Haarlemmertrekvaart built; two coal sheds and two distilleries were built along the train track; between the distilleries and the purification buildings were some external buildings, such as a boiler house and a pump building, and a water tower was located immediately north. There were also some lonely constructions around the site such as an ammonia factory and the board houses. The porter's building, offices and engineering houses were situated along the eastern edge. This part of the site differed from the rest in character, because it housed the administrative functions.

The gas produced from coal is stored in large gas containers, two of which are still visible today The city puts an end to the concession in 1898, taking over the plant and added an additional coke gas plant.

=== Partial destruction of the gas plant and transformation of the park ===
After the second world war, the plant become gradually unnecessary with the extraction of natural gas in the North sea and the discovery of the Groningen gas field.

The production of coal gas is interrupted in 1960, leading to the demolition of several buildings that have become useless. The gas plant keeps producing city gas until 1967, and stops operating altogether after this date.

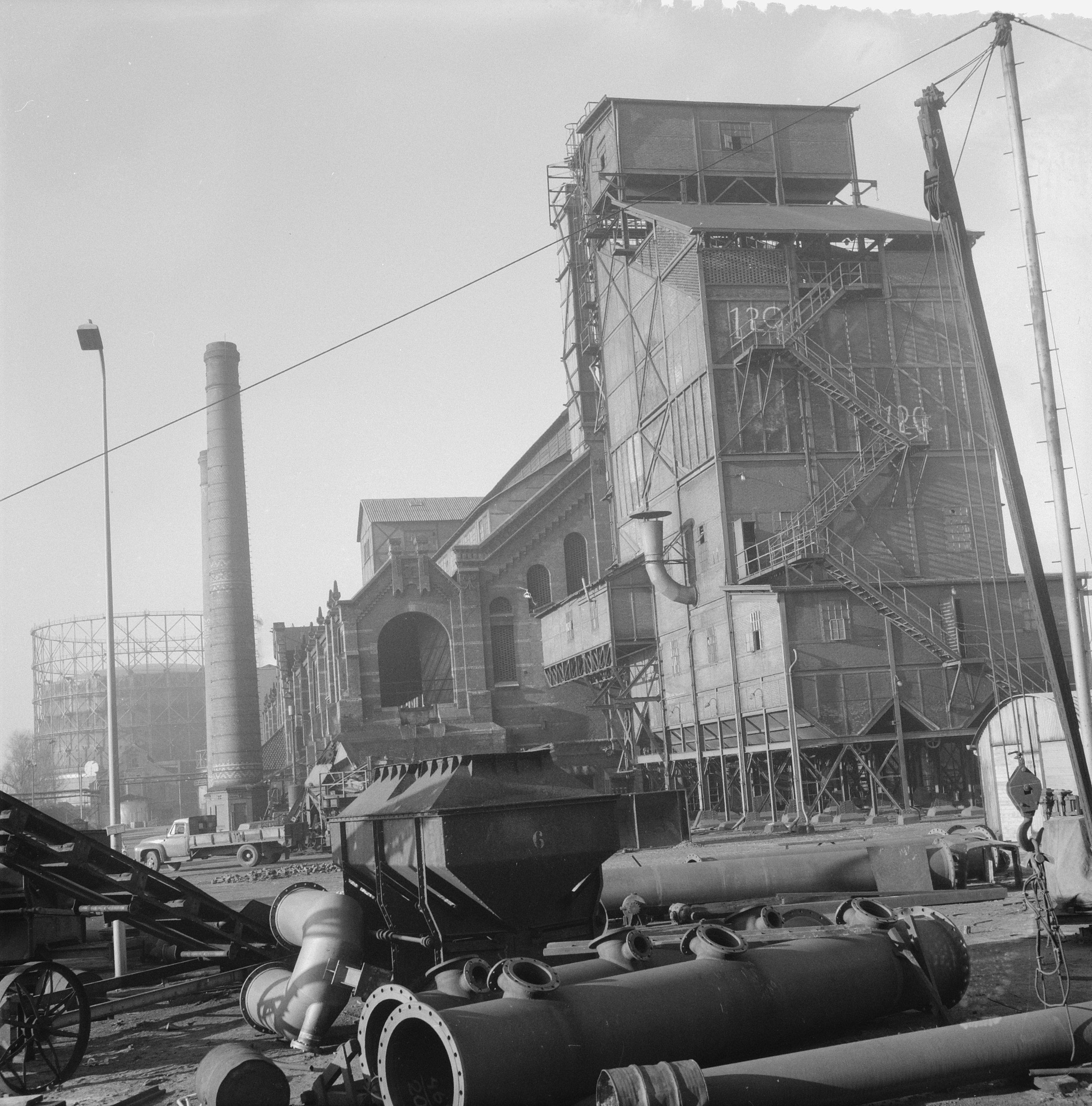
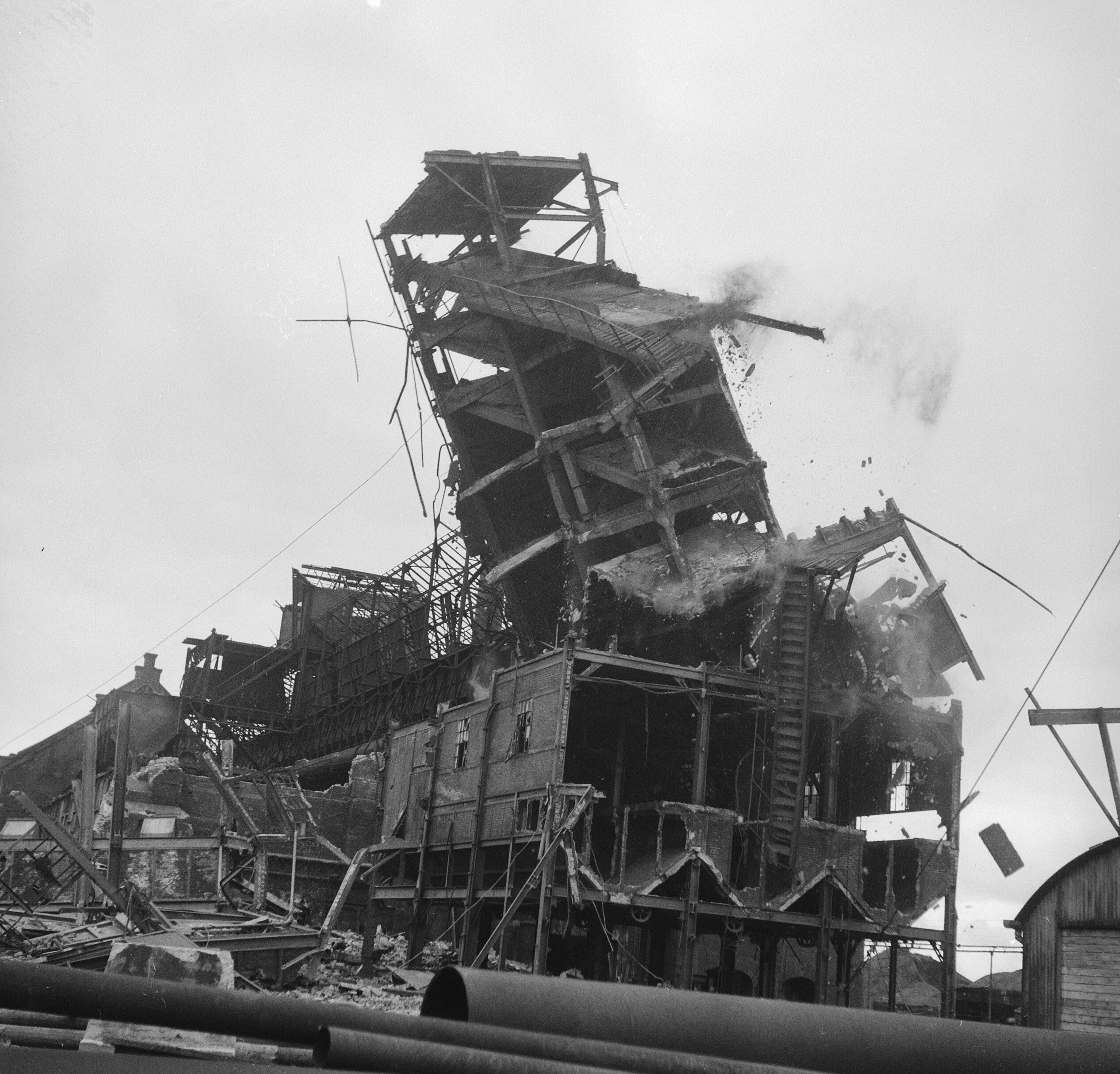
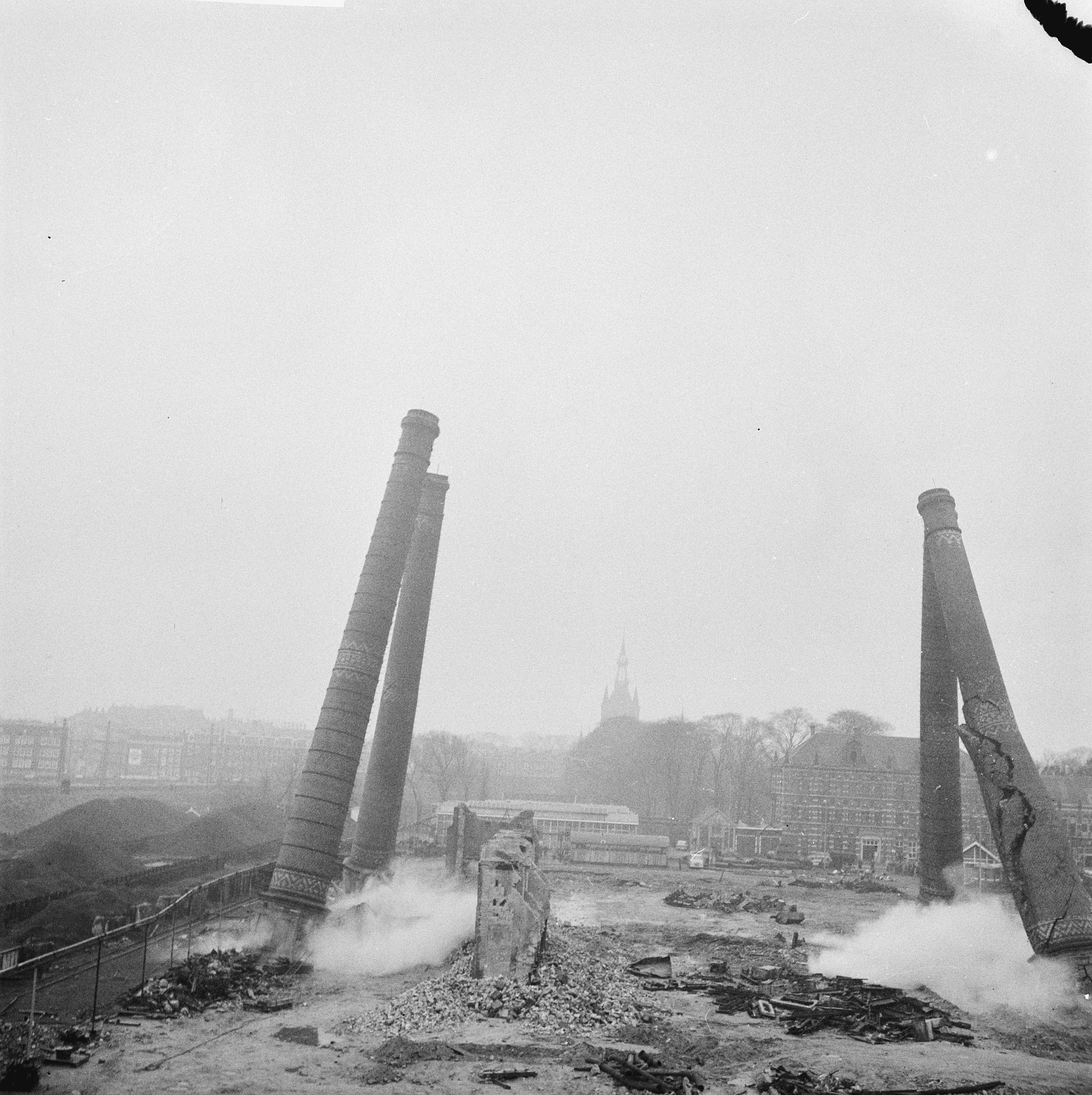
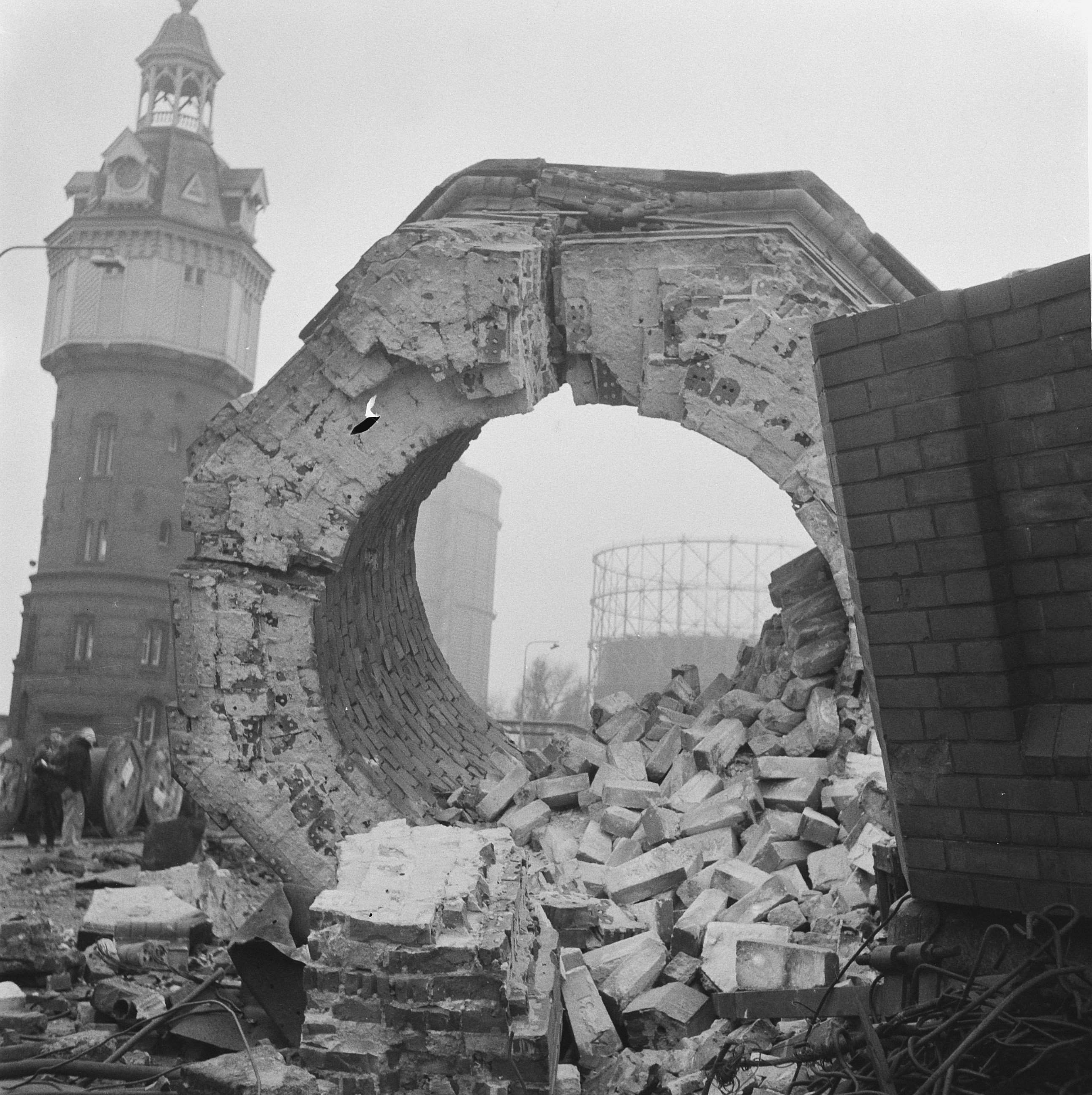
Demolition of some of the buildings of the gas plant in 1961

After the closing of the plant, some of the buildings are demolished, including the water tower, the heavily polluted furnace buildings and the laboratory. Others are left intact:

The old factory site (...) became empty when Amsterdam switched to natural gas in the 1970s. But it retained its most beautiful buildings, the large purification hall, the characteristic gas container, the engineer's house, the boss houses, everything in the Dutch Renaissance style, by architect Isaac Gosschalk.

=== Difficult conversion into a park ===
The reconversion process, however, proves complex: the site is heavily contaminated with chemicals, including tar, lead, and cyanide. After the closing of the factory, the city council considers several options, including using the space as a tram depot and widening the Haarlemmerweg. Local residents protest and manage to block these proposals. In 1981, the park is finally designated for recreational activities.

While the city initially considers scrapping the remaining brownfield buildings to make space for the park, it decides in the early 90s to adopt a creative master plan prepared by American landscape architect Kathryn Gustafson. Gustafson proposes to integrate these buildings and reuse them as cultural centres or cafés, along with elements of rural polders, wetland and pools.

In 1991, the entire Westergasfabriek complex is designated as a National Monument. The park is finally opened to the public in 2003.

=== Train accident ===
On 21 April 2012, two trains are involved in a head-on collision at Westerpark, near Sloterdijk. Approximately 117 people were injured, one of whom later died in the hospital.

== Current buildings and equipments ==
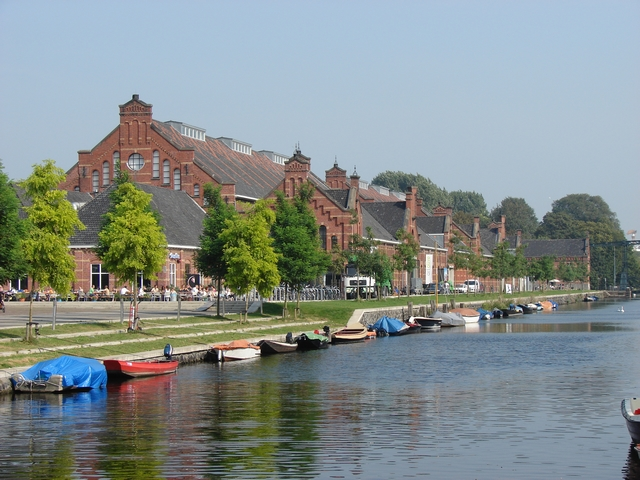
The buildings of the Westergasfabriek along Polonceaukade

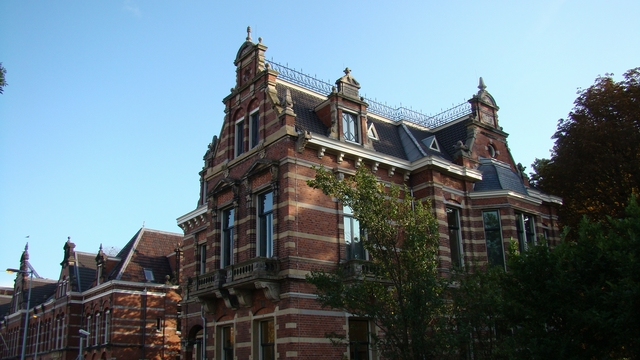
The office building

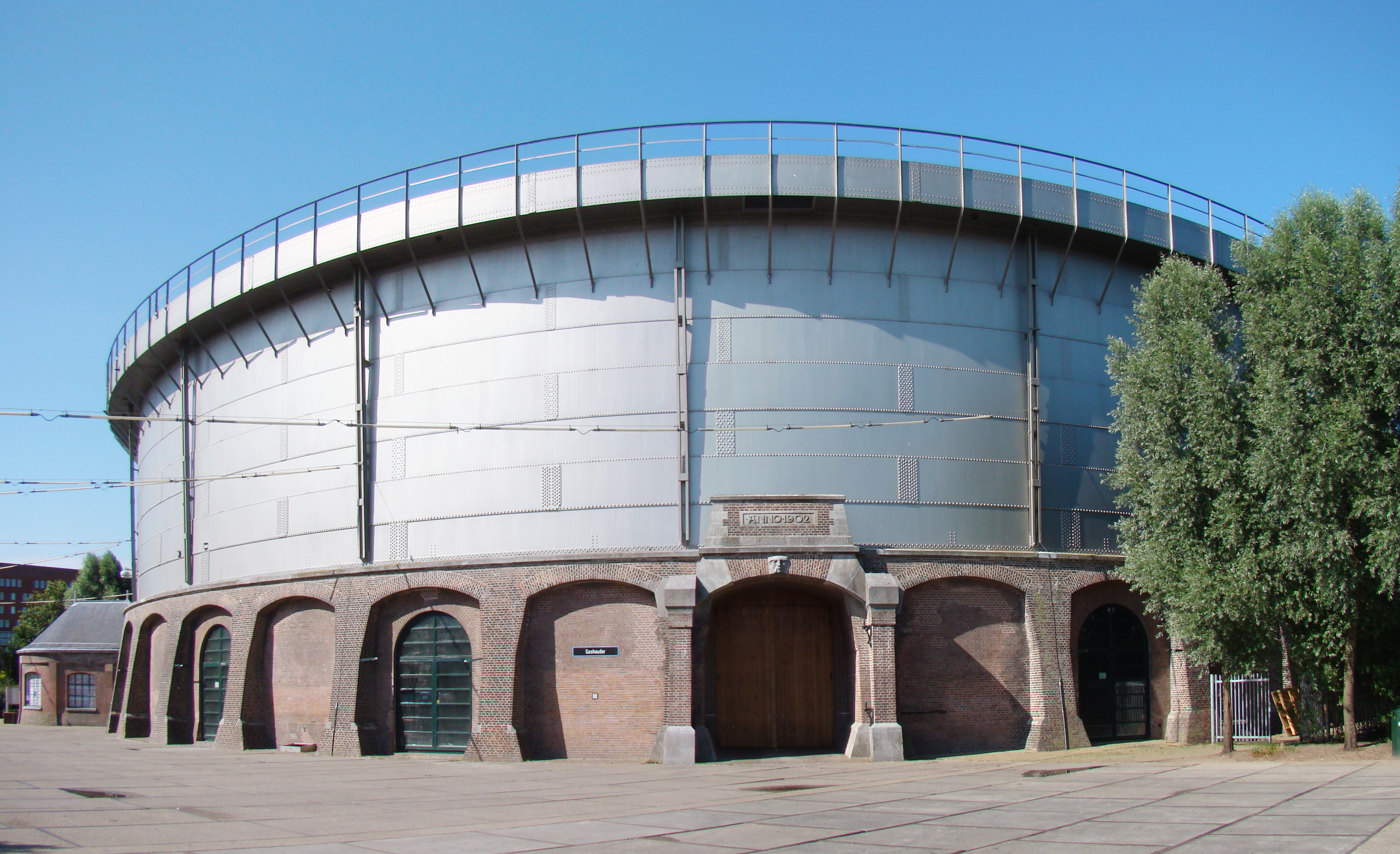
The gas holder

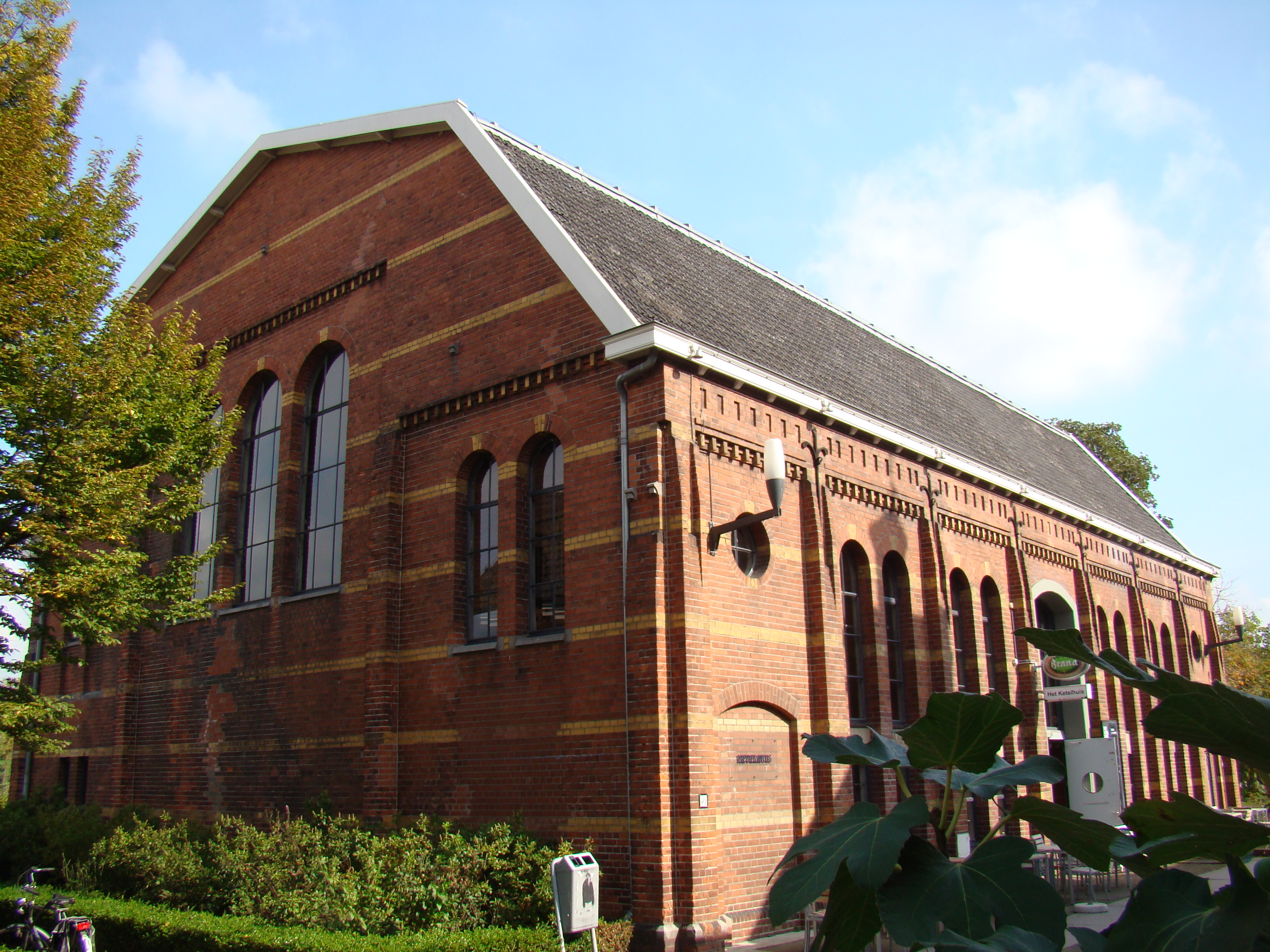
The boiler house (Ketelhuis)

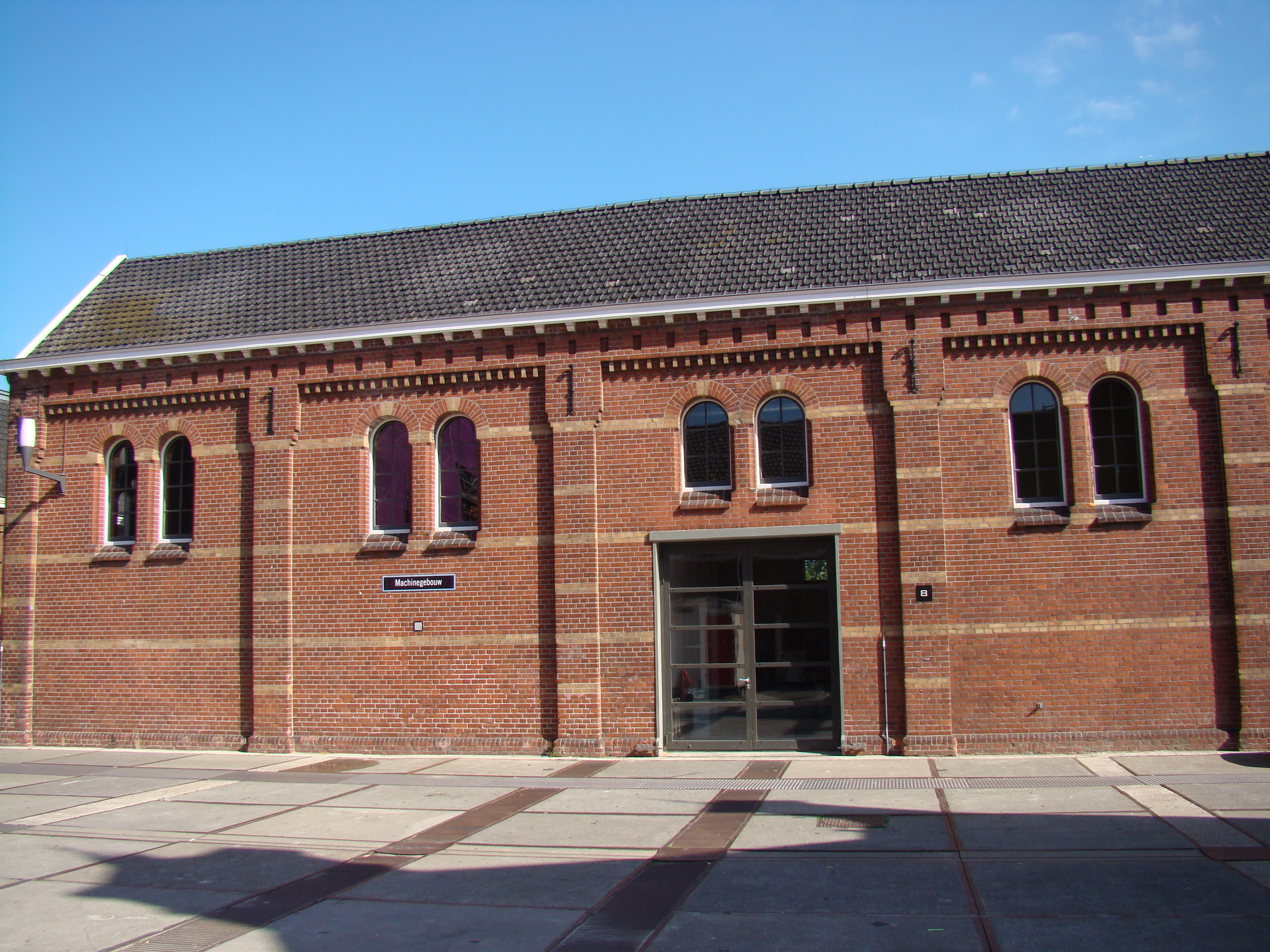
The Regulator's house (Regulateurshuis), near the drawbridge

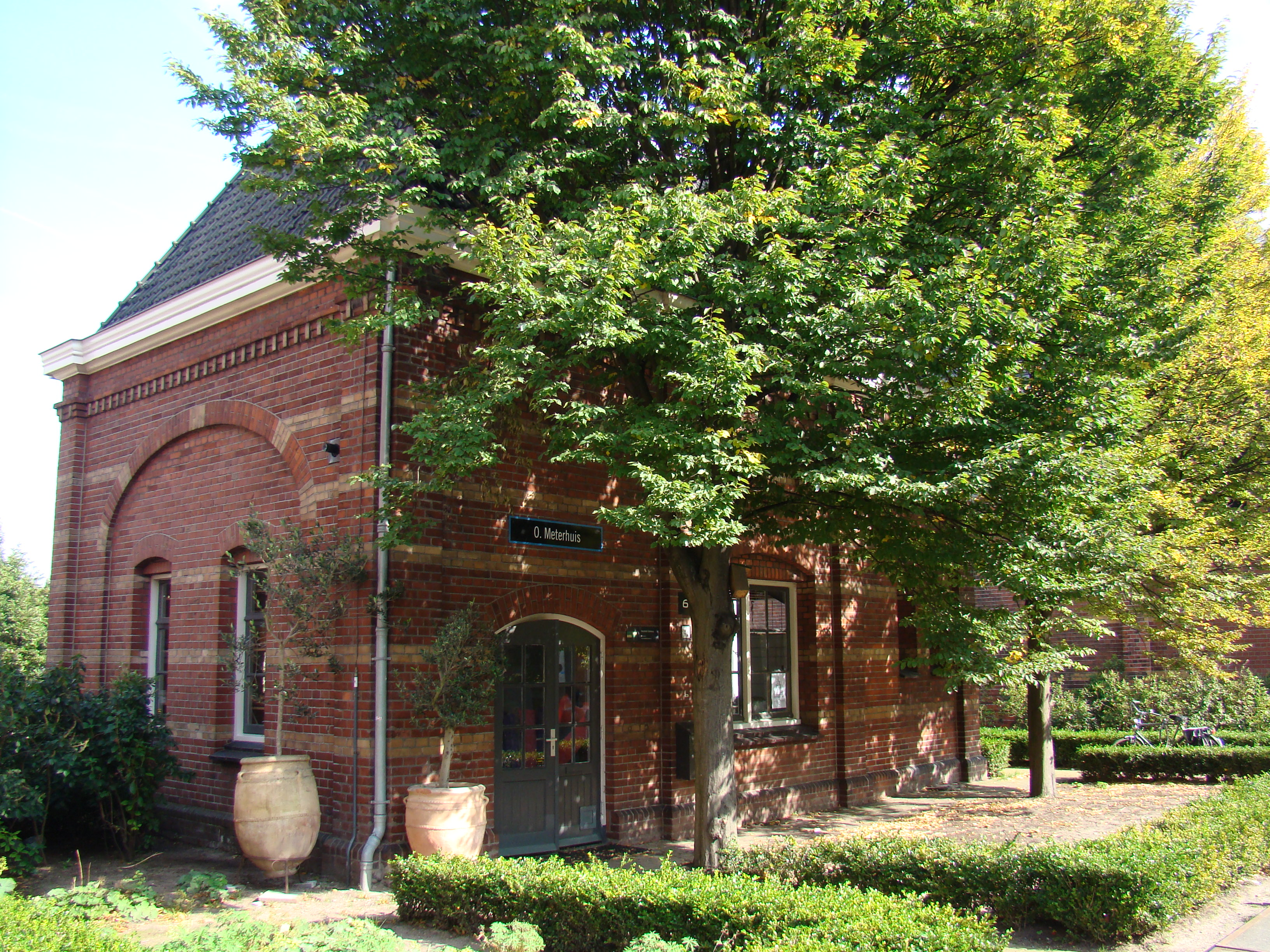
The Eastern Meter House (Meterhuis) on Pazzanistraat

The park connects the industrial buildings of the Westergasfabriek in the east with open polder landscape to the north, a Waternatuurtuin (water nature park), a play area, allotments and the Sint Barbara cemetery. The entire 50-hectare area is now referred to as the Westerpark, a name also used for the neighbourhood to the west of the inner city.

=== Westergasfabriek ===
To the west of the park lies the group of buildings that remain from the original Westergasfabriek. The historic buildings have been renovated and are now hosting cafés, bars, offices, a cinema and venues for markets and cultural events.

The buildings are quite remarkable for their diversity and are representative of the industrial heritage of the site. Olof Koekebakker writes:

The new Westergasfabriek resists description in a single term. It is many things at the same time. Its huge diversity is indeed one of its most distinctive features. For a start, the Westergasfabriek is, as said, a new park in an urban district that has never been generously endowed with greenery (…) The buildings, which are being restored, form a counterpoint to the greenery of the park. The finest of them date from the early days of the gasworks and were designed by the master builder Isaac Gosschalk. Others are less striking for their architectural beauty – although the cast-ironwork in the interior of the Gasholder is unique – but equally form part of an industrial heritage which makes the Westergasfabriek special.

==== Zuiveringshal ====
The architectural style of its large purification hall (Zuiveringshal), where sulphur was extracted from the gas, is particularly noticeable:

The Zuiveringshal is one of the most surprising buildings from the age of the ‘Neo’ styles. An applied architecture in freely designed Neo-renaissance which is both rationalist and picturesque. Ascending arched corbel courses and narrow high windows make the front look slightly Romanesque.

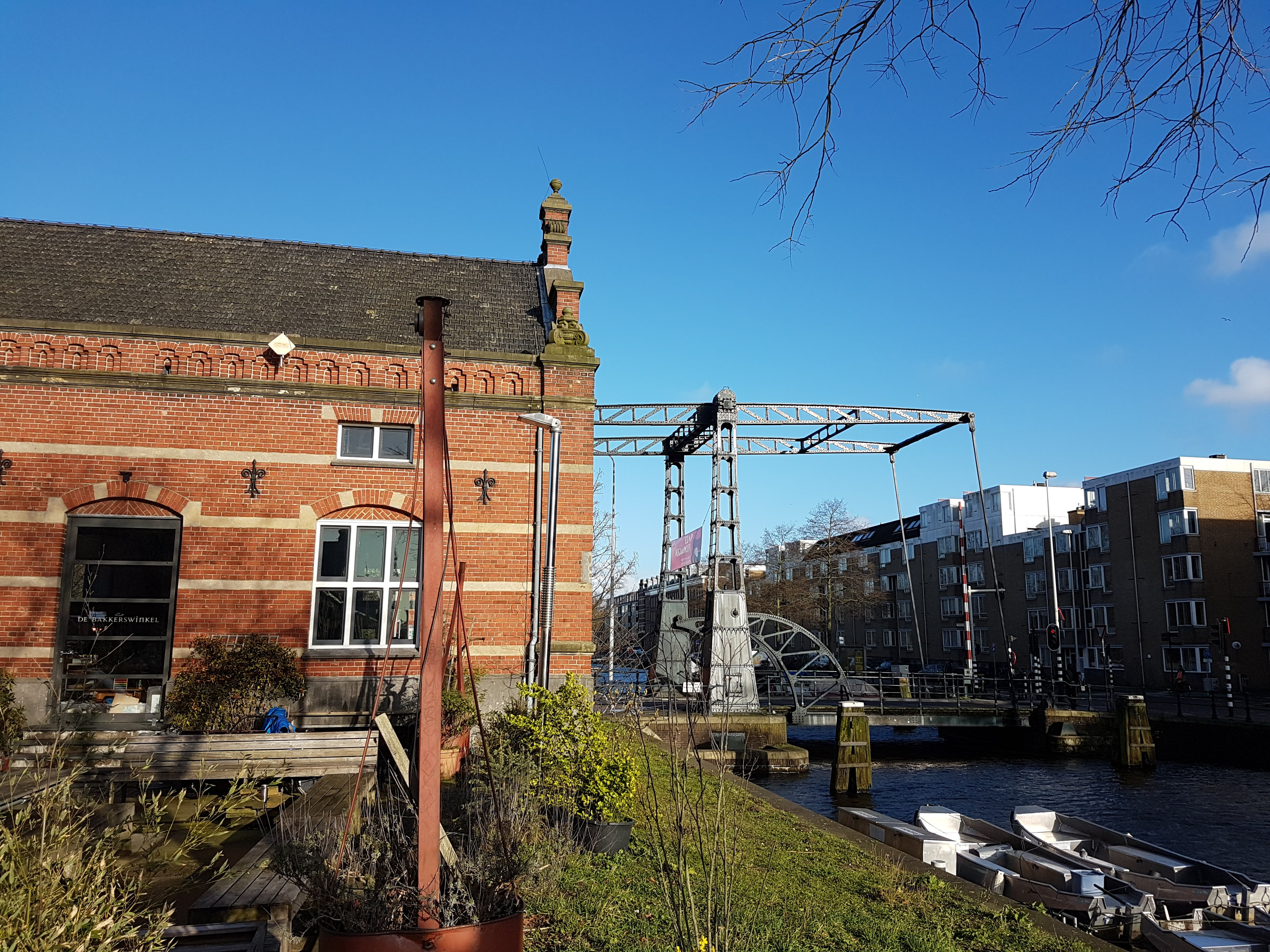
The drawbridge over the Haarlemmervaart

==== Canal lock, lock chamber and pump ====
The lock complex in the Haarlemmertrekvaart was built with the construction of the Westergasfabriek around 1883. It provides a good example of late nineteenth-century water management.

=== Steel drawbridge ===
The south-eastern entrance over the Haarlemmervaart consists of a drawbridge that dates back to 1919. Originally situated on the Zijkanaal in Amsterdam-Noord, it was moved to its current location in 1956 to serve as an access bridge to the site of the Westergasfabriek.

== Art ==
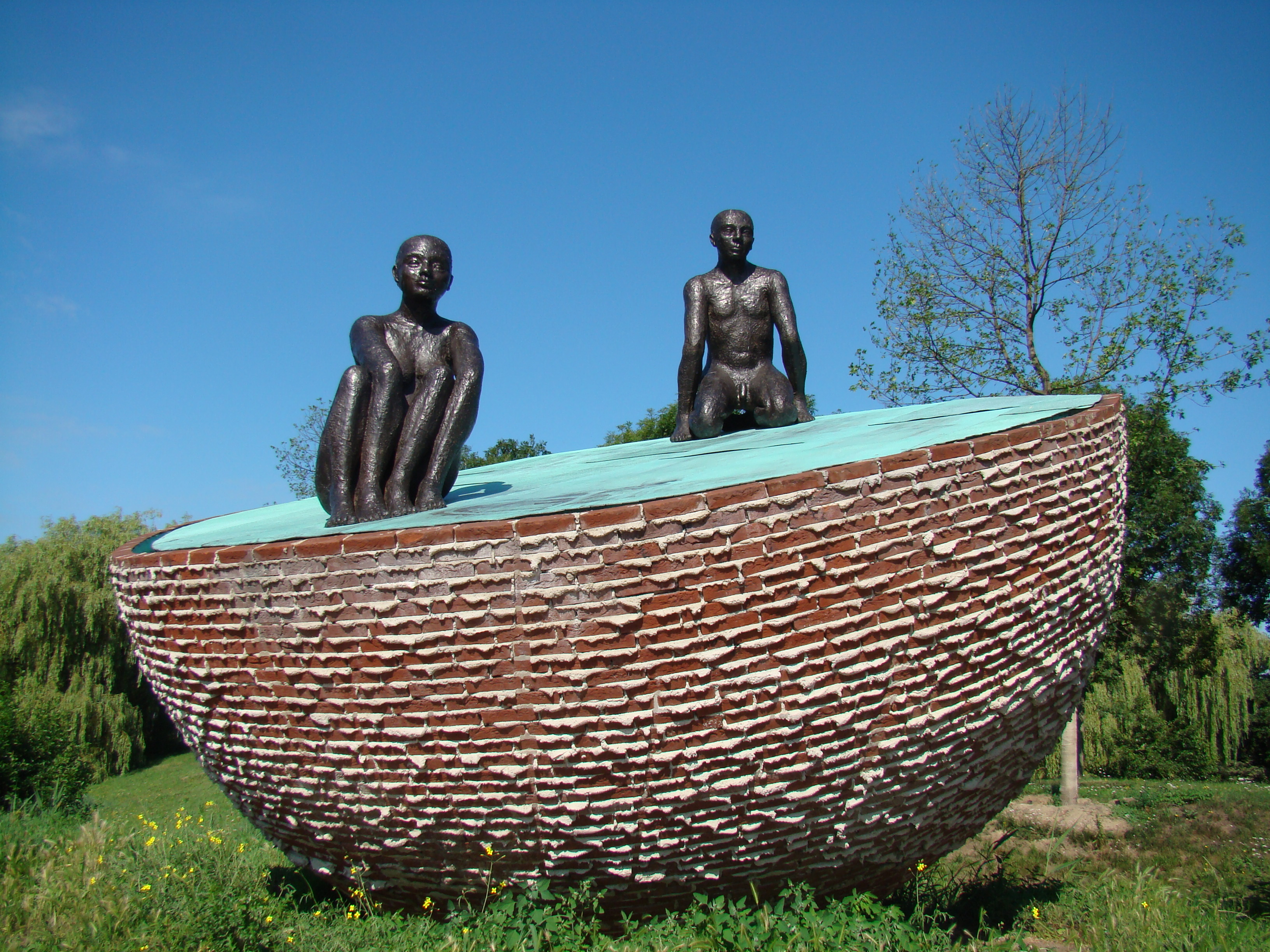
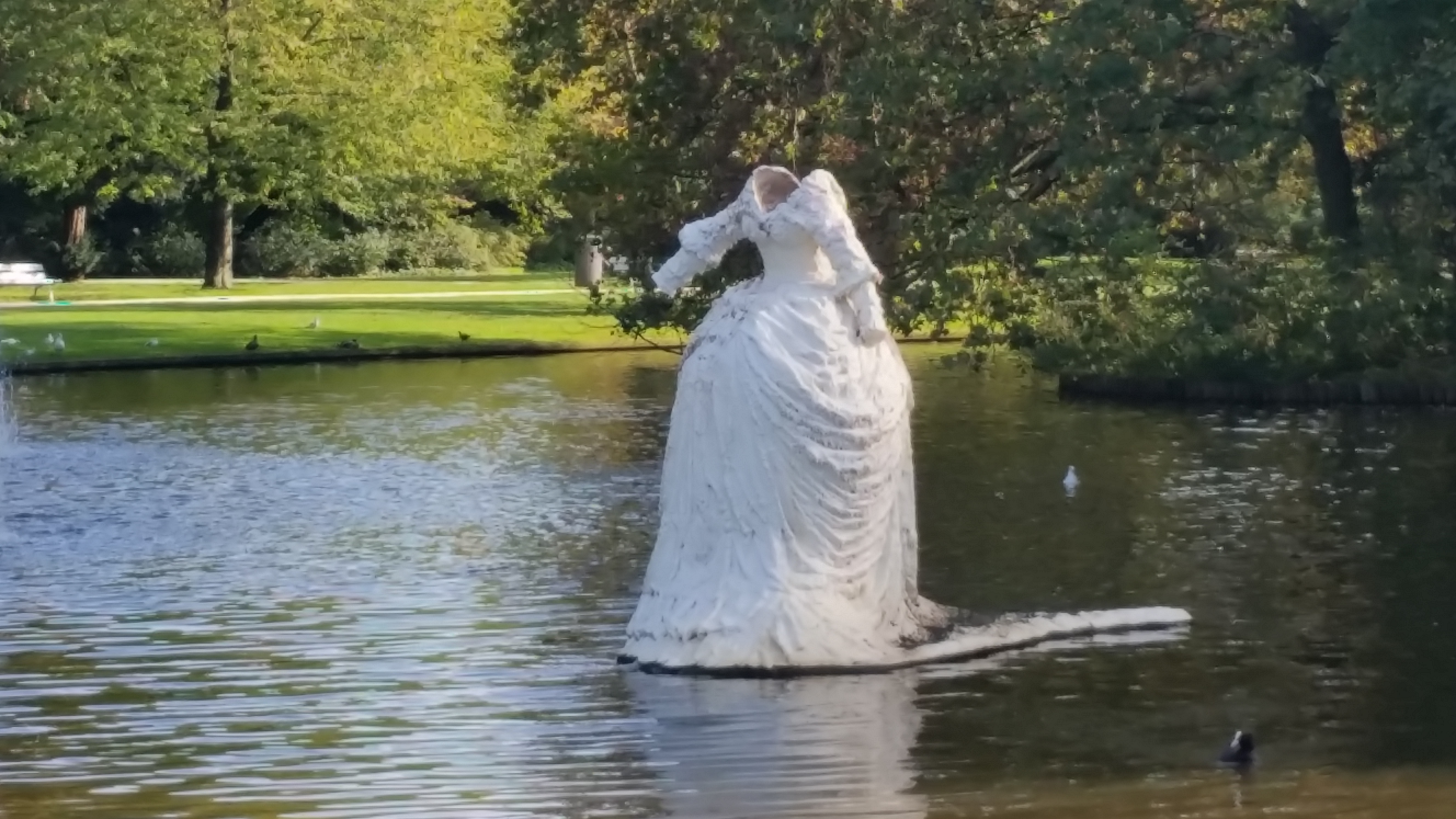
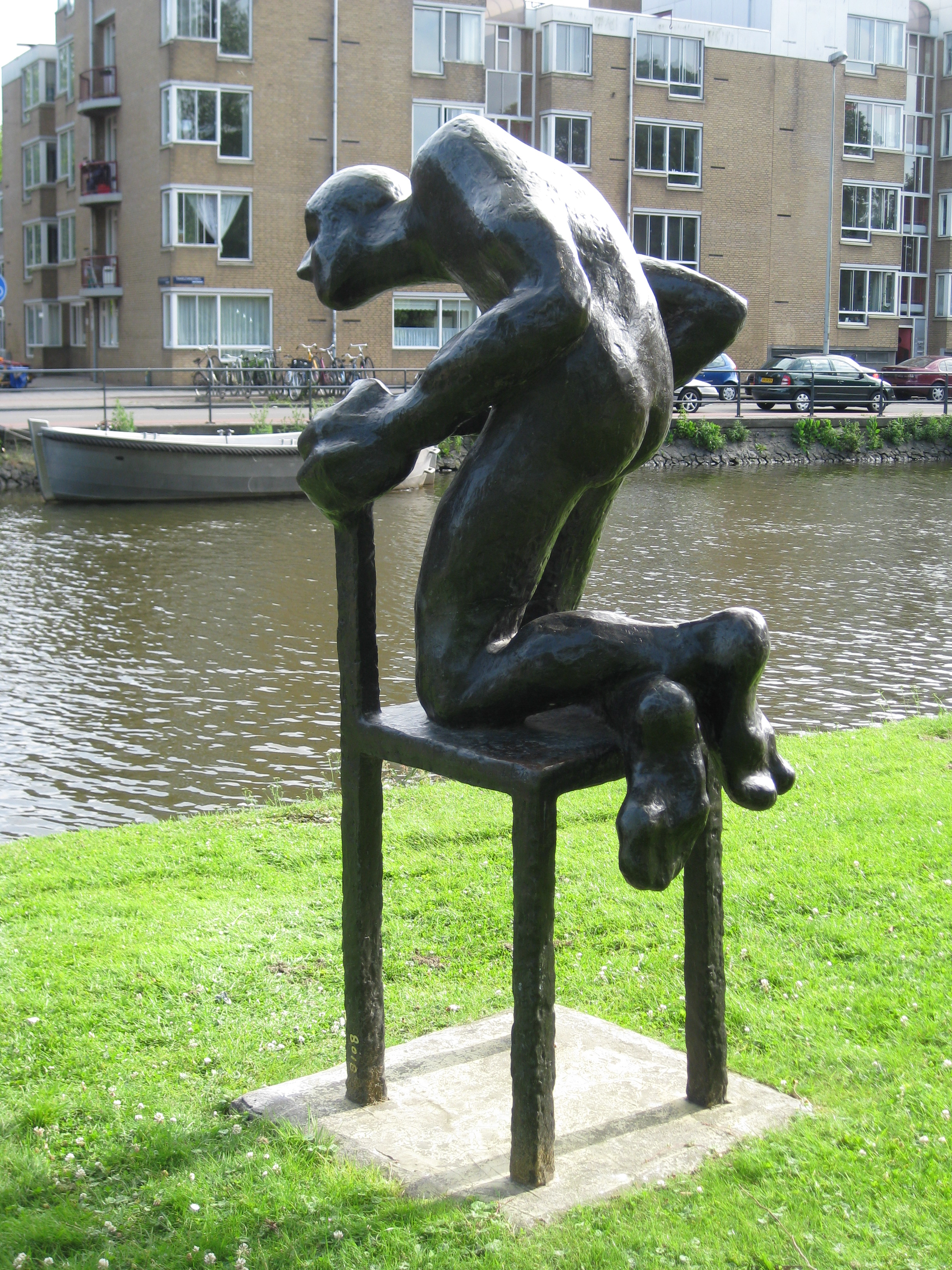
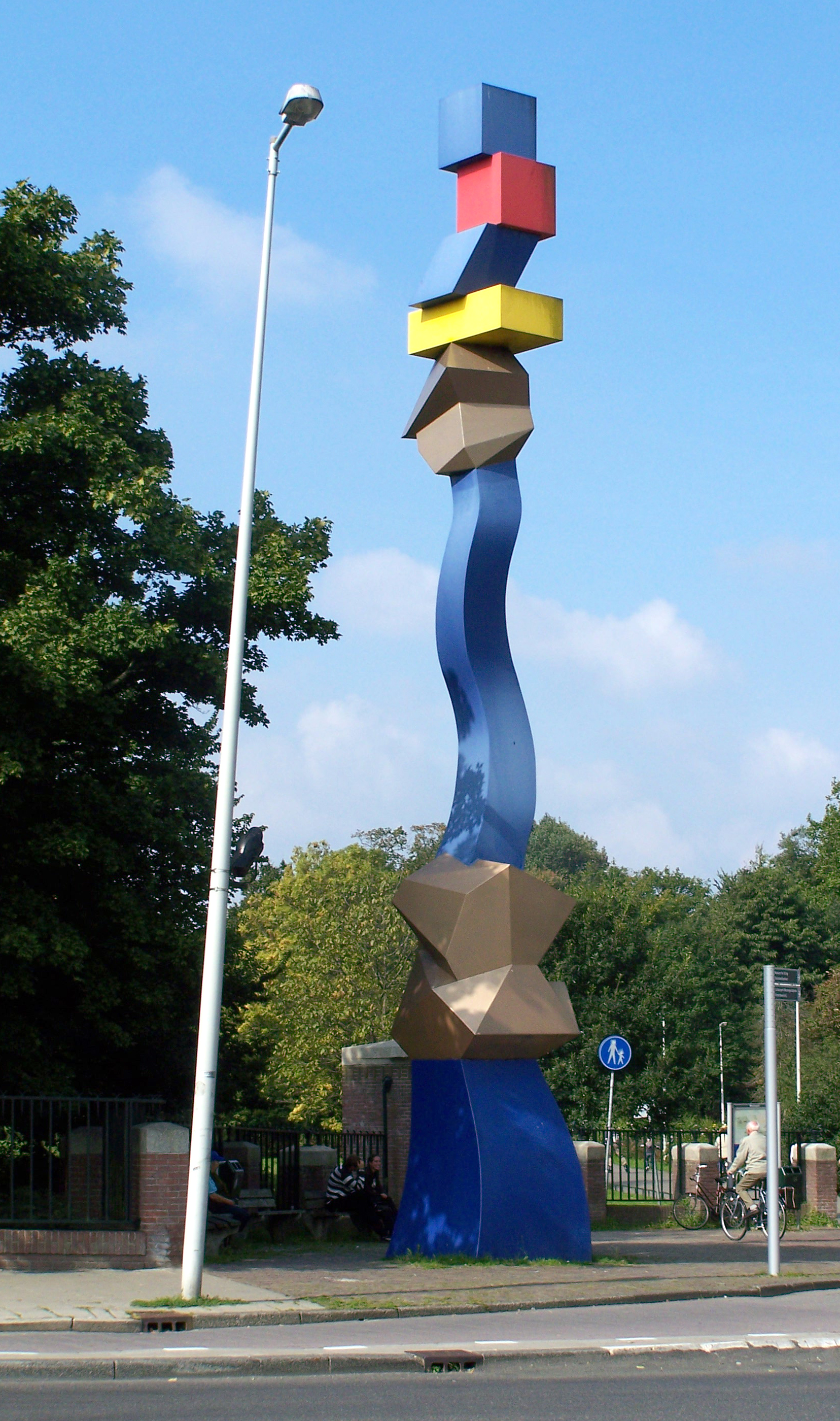
Some of the sculptures visible in Westerpark: Untitled ("Bolbewoners") by Herman Makkink (2003), The Bruidsjurk (wedding dress) by Patchwork (2004), the Man on a stool (Man op kruk) by Ronald Tolman (1986), Untitled by Michiel Schierbeek (1986)

The park features several sculptures:

- Michiel Schierbeek’s 1986 "Untitled" sculpture, located at the Nassauplein and inspired by De Stijl
- The wedding dress (Bruidsjurk), a sculpture that floats every year in the Westerpark pond from mid-April to late October. It was created by patchwork, a collective of women, in 1994
- The "Man on a stool" by Ronald Tolman (1986). The man seems to be looking at another sculpture made by Liesbeth Pallesen
- Herman Makkink's untitled sculpture (2004), often called "Bolbewoners". It represents two bronze figures, having legs instead of arms, sitting on an inclined hemisphere. Makkink suggested that this work "relates to the human condition. We are half animal half human and to our great surprise, we come to life on this earth, uninvited, in an almost impossible position. Only by focusing our gaze on the infinite can we overcome this awkward situation'
- "Gold In Your Mind, Gold In Your Feet" by Mirjam Janse, representing a figure bending over backwards
