= KLM Cityhopper Flight 433 =

1994 aviation accident in the Netherlands

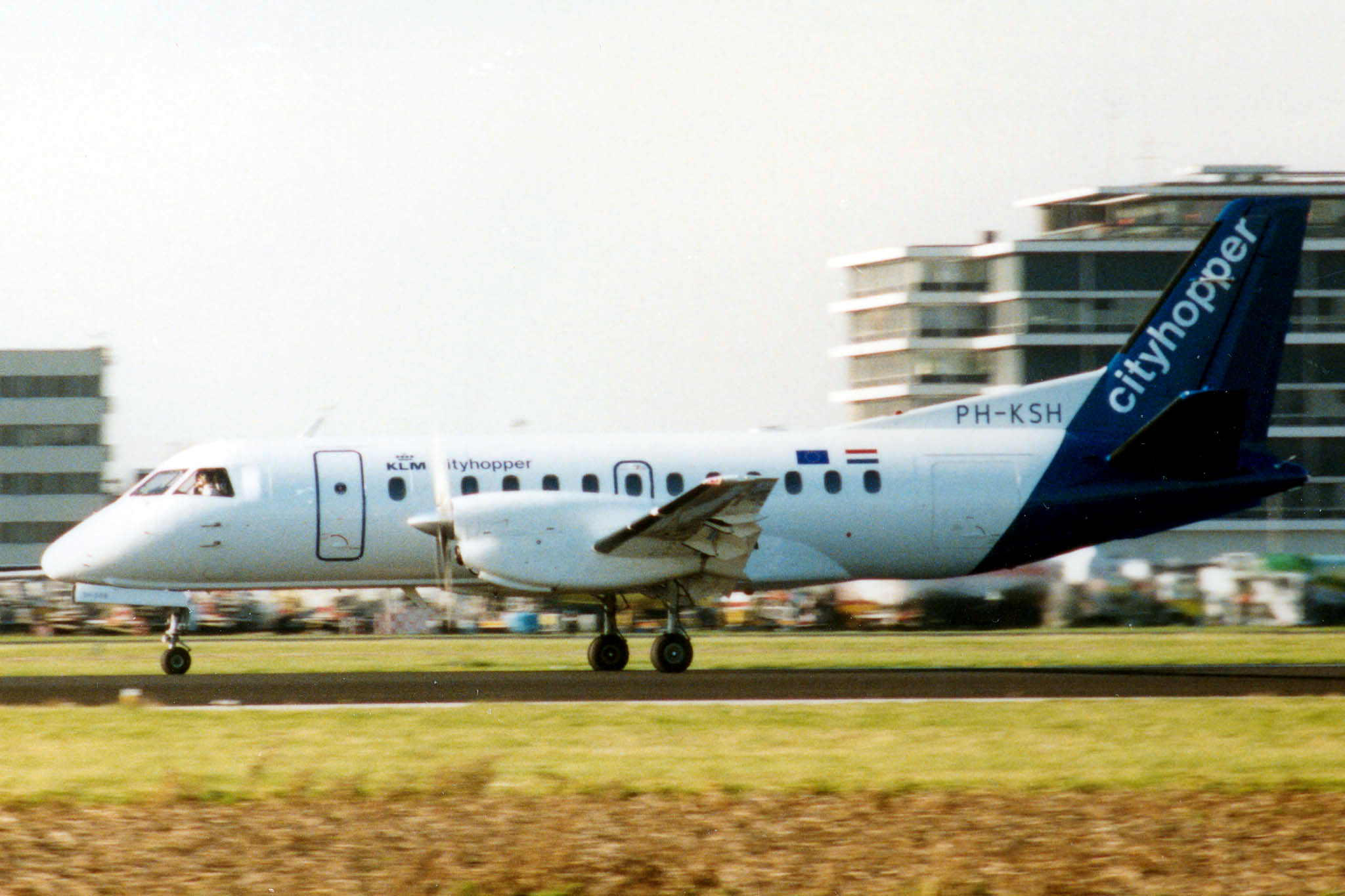
- PH-KSH, the aircraft involved in the accident, seen in 1990

Accident
- Date: 4 April 1994
- Summary: Crashed following loss of control and pilot error during go-around
- Site: Amsterdam Schiphol Airport, Amsterdam, Netherlands; 52.2906°N 4.7498°E

Aircraft
- Aircraft type: Saab 340B
- Aircraft name: City of Hamburg
- Operator: KLM Cityhopper
- IATA flight No.: KL433
- Call sign: KLM 433
- Registration: PH-KSH
- Flight origin: Amsterdam Schiphol Airport, Amsterdam, Netherlands
- Destination: Cardiff International Airport, Cardiff, Wales
- Occupants: 24
- Passengers: 21
- Crew: 3
- Fatalities: 3
- Injuries: 21
- Survivors: 21

KLM Cityhopper Flight 433 was a Saab 340B, registered as PH-KSH, which crashed during an emergency landing on 4 April 1994, resulting in the death of 3 occupants, including the captain. Flight 433 was a routine scheduled flight from Amsterdam, the Netherlands, to Cardiff, Wales, United Kingdom. The accident was caused by inadequate pilot training and a faulty sensor, leading to loss of control during go-around.

== Accident ==
The aircraft took off from Runway 24 at Schiphol Airport at 14:19 local time, with the captain as the pilot flying. At 14:30, as the aircraft was climbing through 16,500 feet, the pilots observed a warning light indicating low oil pressure in the right engine. However, the oil pressure gauge was still showing above 30 psi (210 kPa), indicating that oil pressure was within safe limits and the warning was false. While the first officer consulted the emergency checklist, the captain unilaterally set the right engine's power to idle, probably to reduce the risk of engine damage. The checklist recommended continuing normal flight operations under the circumstances, because the oil pressure gauge took priority over the warning light.

However, the captain did not return the engine to the previous throttle setting, leaving the aircraft effectively flying on one engine. The first officer was not aware that the captain had reduced the power setting on the right engine. Both pilots observed a low oil pressure indication on the right engine, but failed to recognize that the low oil pressure indication would be normal with a reduced engine power setting. As the Saab approached flight level 170 (17,000 feet [5,182 m]), the loss of power degraded the aircraft's climb performance. The crew misinterpreted this and the decreasing oil pressure from the retarding right engine, as confirmation that the engine was faulty. A Pan-Pan call was made at 14:33, requesting to return to Schiphol.

The captain had not anticipated the consequences of flying with one engine at idle, and was unable to stabilise the final approach onto Runway 06; the situation was aggravated by an 8-knot (15 km/h; 9.2 mph) tailwind. He also disengaged the autopilot, while the first officer neutralised the rudder trim, both of which had been compensating for the asymmetric thrust. During this time the aircraft fell below the glideslope and airspeed decreased to 115 knots (213 km/h; 132 mph), below the target approach speed of 125 knots (232 km/h; 144 mph). In response, the captain increased torque on the left engine, causing the aircraft to veer to the right of the runway. The crew did not apply additional rudder deflection to correct it, instead relying on the ailerons. The false warning light was later determined to be caused by a short circuit

At a height of 45 feet (14 m), the captain decided to perform a go-around, and commanded full throttle to the left engine, while leaving the right engine at idle. The crew continued to only use the ailerons to counteract the thrust imbalance. The aircraft rolled to the right and pitched up, while airspeed decayed to 105 knots (194 km/h; 121 mph), activating the stall warning. Some rudder deflection was applied afterwards, and full deflection was applied 8 seconds later, but the aircraft was unrecoverable as airspeed decreased to 93 knots (172 km/h; 107 mph) and the right bank increased to 80 degrees.

At 14:46 local time, the aircraft crashed in a field just outside the airport, 560 metres (1,837 ft; 612 yd) from the runway. Of the 24 people on board, 3 were killed—the captain and 2 passengers. Out of the 21 survivors, 9 suffered serious injuries, including the first officer. Due to amnesia caused by the accident, the first officer could not recall the accident.

== Background ==
=== Aircraft ===
The aircraft involved was a Saab 340B, registered as PH-KSH, with serial number 195, which had first flown in 1990. The aircraft was powered by two General Electric CT7-9B turboshaft engines and had flown 6,558 hours at the time of the accident.

=== Crew ===
In command was 37-year-old Captain Gerrit Lievaart. He had been with KLM Cityhopper since 2 March 1992. He had a total of 2,605 hours flying time, including 1,214 hours on a Saab 340. However, training records revealed that he had failed two engine-out checks, and on his most recent one had been given a "standard minus," the lowest passing grade. His co-pilot was 34-year-old First Officer Paul Stassen. He had been with KLM Cityhopper since 27 January 1992. He had a total of 1,718 hours flying time, including 1,334 hours on a Saab 340.

== Accident investigation ==
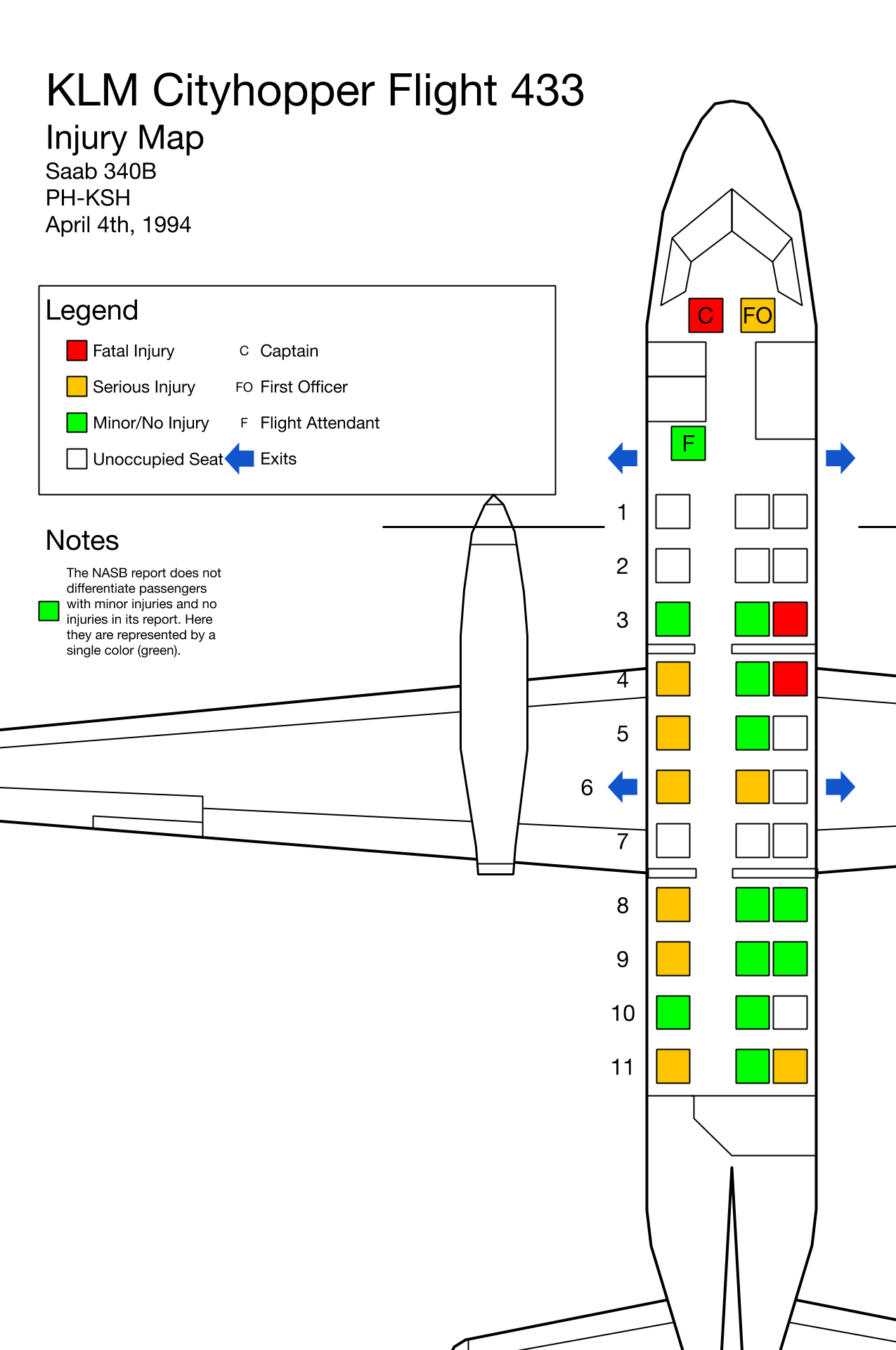
KLM Cityhopper Flight 433 seating chart based on the NASB report, revealing locations of passengers, severity of injuries, and deaths

The final report from the Netherlands Aviation Safety Board found that pilot error, through inadequate use of flight controls during an unequal throttle go-around, resulting in a loss of control, was the primary cause of the accident. In addition, the report included recommendations directed at KLM, regarding contributing factors, addressing: improved training on crew resource management; improved pilot assessment techniques; and improved guidance on flying with an idle engine. In addition, the report found that the crash was generally survivable, with the captain's death attributable to not wearing his shoulder restraints.

== In popular culture ==
The crash of KLM Cityhopper Flight 433 was covered in 2019 in "Fatal Approach", an episode of the internationally syndicated Canadian TV documentary series Mayday.
