= Dutch Safety Board =

Government safety authority

- Onderzoeksraad voor Veiligheid

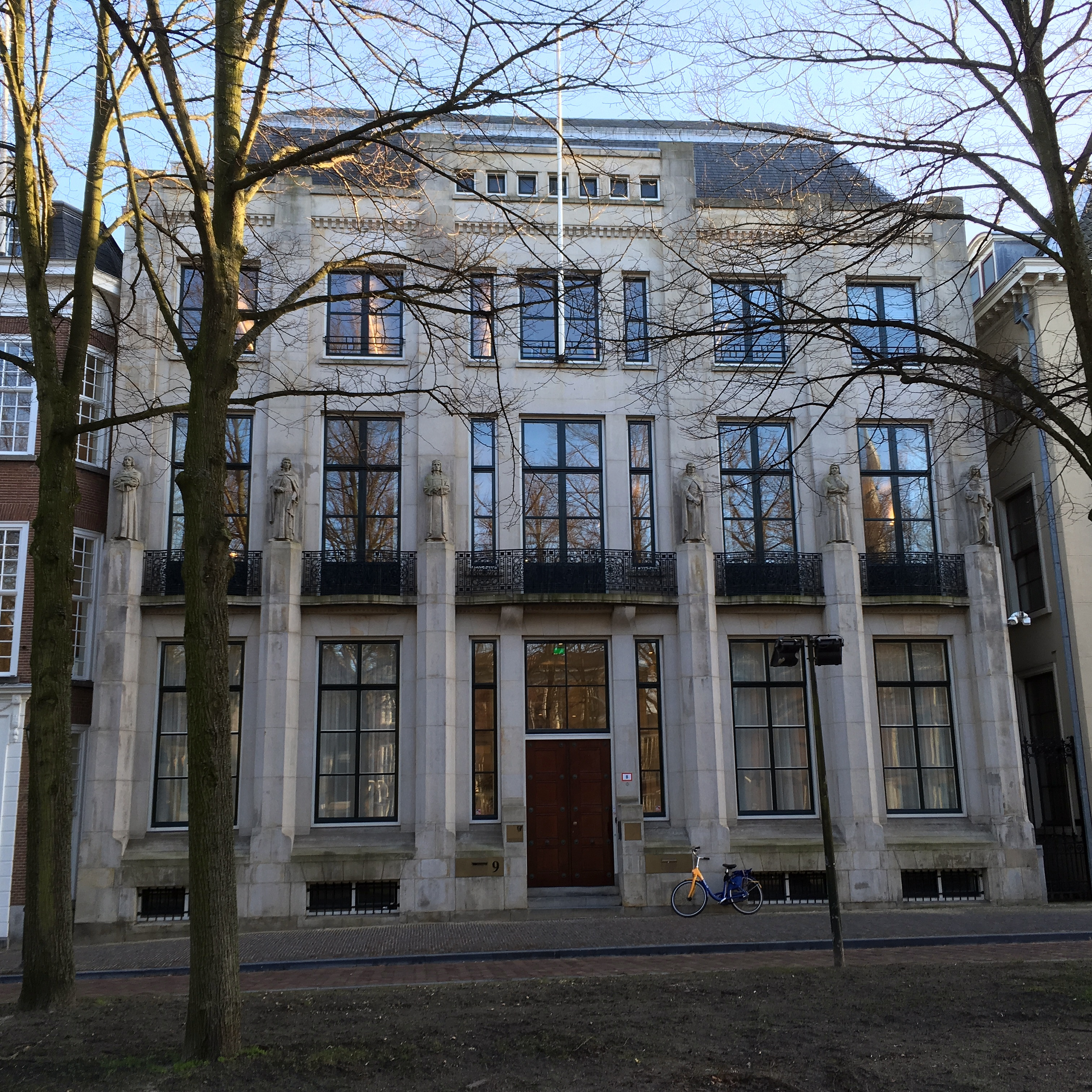
- Head office of the Dutch Safety Board, on Lange Voorhout in The Hague

Agency overview
- Formed: 1 February 2005; 21 years ago
- Jurisdiction: Government of the Netherlands
- Headquarters: Lange Voorhout 9, The Hague
- Website: onderzoeksraad.nl

The Dutch Safety Board (DSB; Dutch: Onderzoeksraad voor Veiligheid, OVV, literally "Investigation Council for Safety") is the official body that investigates a wide variety of safety matters in the Netherlands. It is based in The Hague.

== History ==
The DSB was created on 1 February 2005 after the Enschede fireworks disaster and the Volendam café fire. The board was formed from a merger between the defence and public transportation safety boards. It replaced the Dutch Transport Safety Board.

The first DSB Chairman was Pieter van Vollenhoven, who served from 2005 until 2011. He was succeeded by Tjibbe Joustra, who retired in 2019; he was succeeded by former Finance Minister Jeroen Dijsselbloem.

As of 2012, the DSB actively investigates accidents and incidents related to aviation, construction and services, crisis management and aid provision, defence, human and animal health care, industry and networks, pipelines, rail transport, shipping, as well as water. The DSB has the authorisation to investigate accidents and incidents in any conceivable field.

The National Bureau of Air Accidents Investigation of Ukraine (NBAAI) had requested that the DSB participate in the international investigation of Malaysia Airlines Flight 17; the DSB received formal notice of the accident from the NBAAI on 18 July 2014. The NBAAI delegated the investigation to the DSB because of the large number of Dutch passengers and the fact that the flight originated in Amsterdam.

As a result of the 2017 fipronil egg scandal, the Dutch Safety Board announced on 8 August that an official investigation had been initiated.

== Areas of investigations ==
Operational sectors of investigations include:

- Aviation (commercial, passenger and private aviation)
- Shipping (inland navigation and some segments of recreational navigation)
- Rail transport (railways and increasingly also tram, metro and light rail)
- Road transport (due to the high number of accidents, only thematic investigations)
- Pipelines (pipelines, public utilities included)
- Defence (military aviation, navigation, road transport, underground infrastructure)
- Industry and trade (heavy industry (especially process industry, labour accidents))
- Crisis management and aid provision (performance of aid and control services)
- Healthcare (human and animal)
- Nature and environment (impact of aviation, marine operations, railroad and transportation)

The DSB's territory is the Netherlands, including European Netherlands and the Caribbean Netherlands (Bonaire, Saba, and Sint Eustatius). The DSB can investigate occurrences in or in the waters of Aruba, Curaçao, or Sint Maarten if the respective government asks the DSB to do so.

== Structure ==
The board acts as an autonomous organisation. Its code of conduct is established by law.

The organisation consists of a Board and a Bureau. The Board has five permanent members, the Bureau fulfills executive tasks.

== See also ==
- Turkish Airlines Flight 1951
- Sloterdijk train collision
- Netherlands Aviation Safety Board (predecessor agency)
- Aircraft Incident Management Procedure (Netherlands)
