= Netherlands Aviation Safety Board =

- Raad voor de Luchtvaart

Accident investigation authority overview
- Dissolved: 1 July 1999
- Jurisdiction: Government of the Netherlands
- Headquarters: Hoofddorp, Haarlemmermeer, Netherlands

The Netherlands Aviation Safety Board (Dutch: Raad voor de Luchtvaart) was an agency of the Government of the Netherlands. It investigated aviation accidents and incidents. Its head office was located in Hoofddorp in the Haarlemmermeer municipality.

The Dutch Transport Safety Board, the successor agency, was established on 1 July 1999 and the Netherlands Aviation Safety Board was merged into the agency at that time.

== Accidents investigated by the agency ==
- El Al Flight 1862
- KLM Cityhopper Flight 433

In addition it made commentary about:

- Tenerife disaster
- Martinair Flight 495

== See also ==
- Dutch Safety Board (current agency)
