= Amsterdam Westerpark train collision =

2012 train crash in the Netherlands

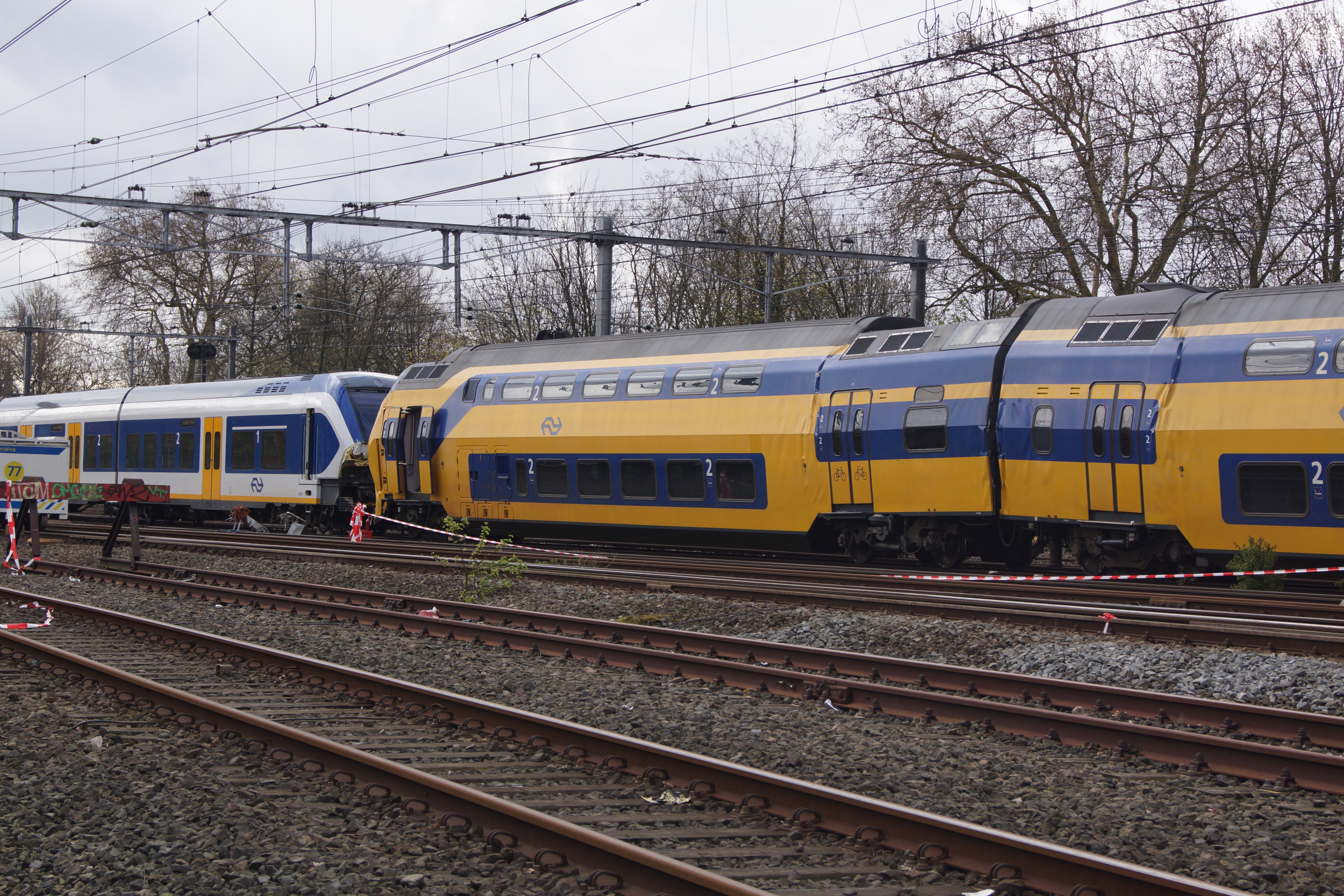
- The two trains involved in the collision near Westerpark

Details
- Date: 21 April 2012; 18:30 local time (16:30 UTC)
- Location: Westerpark, Amsterdam
- Coordinates: 52.387364°N 4.879003°E
- Country: Netherlands
- Line: Oude Lijn
- Operator: Nederlandse Spoorwegen
- Incident type: Head-on collision
- Cause: Suspected SPAD

Statistics
- Trains: 2
- Passengers: 136
- Deaths: 1
- Injured: 116 (12 critical, 43 or 44 serious, < 60 minor)
Route map

On 21 April 2012 at 18:30 local time (16:30 UTC), two trains were involved in a head-on collision at Westerpark, near Sloterdijk, in the west of Amsterdam, Netherlands. Approximately 117 people were injured, one of whom later died in hospital. The collision is thought to have been caused by the driver of one of the trains passing a red signal.

== Collision ==
In the early evening a local train (an NS Sprinter Lighttrain) had just left Amsterdam Centraal and collided with a double-decker NS VIRM Intercity train travelling in the opposite direction on the same track. While initial reports varied, 117 people were injured, 13 critically, 43 or 44 seriously, and dozens more had minor injuries. On 22 April 2012, a 68-year-old woman died from her injuries. There were sixteen people still in hospital. On 23 May 2012, the last injured person was discharged from hospital.

The trains involved were an NS Class 2600 electric multiple unit, number 2658, and an NS VIRM double-deck electric multiple unit, number 8711. Neither of the two trains derailed. Passengers were reported to have been thrown against walls, seats, windows, and other passengers. Just before the crash, witnesses said one of the trains let out an extended blast of its horn. The VIRM unit received moderate damage, with deformation at the rear of the first and front of the second carriage.

The collision occurred between Amsterdam Centraal and Amsterdam Sloterdijk stations, near Westerpark, suspending railway services between Amsterdam and The Hague as well as to Schiphol Airport on one of the busiest rail routes in the Netherlands. The local train was travelling between Amsterdam and Uitgeest whilst the Intercity train was travelling between Den Helder and Nijmegen. By Sunday afternoon, traffic was partially restored with a full service expected by that evening. The crash happened on a section of the line where trains operate at reduced speeds. It is estimated that at the moment of the collision the intercity was travelling at 25–30 km/h (16–19 mph) and the local train at about 20 km/h (12 mph). Bus services were relied upon on to get people to their destinations during the suspension.

Ik vrees dat ik een rood sein heb gemist.
I fear I missed a stopping signal.
– Driver of the SLT train.

A reporter from de Volkskrant travelled on board the SLT train, immediately behind the cab. He reported the driver of that train stated she feared that she had just missed a red signal.

== Emergency response ==
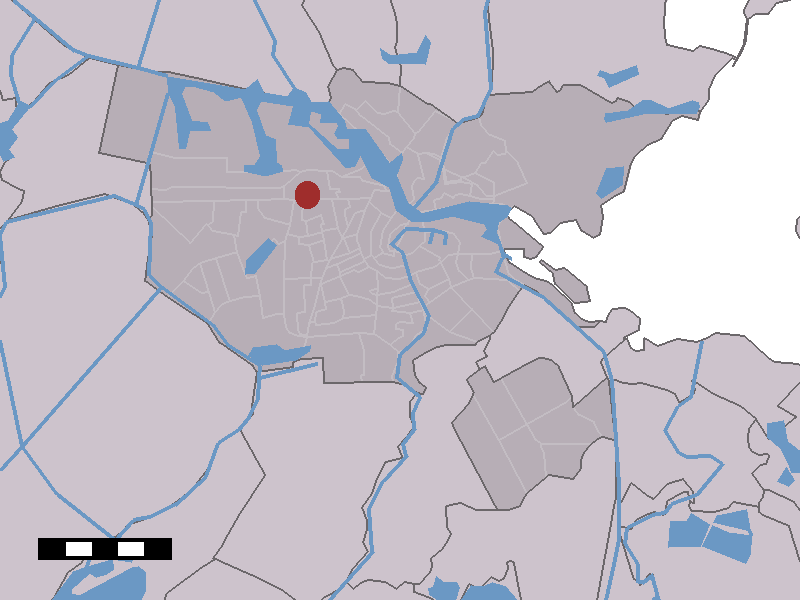
Location of Westerpark in Amsterdam

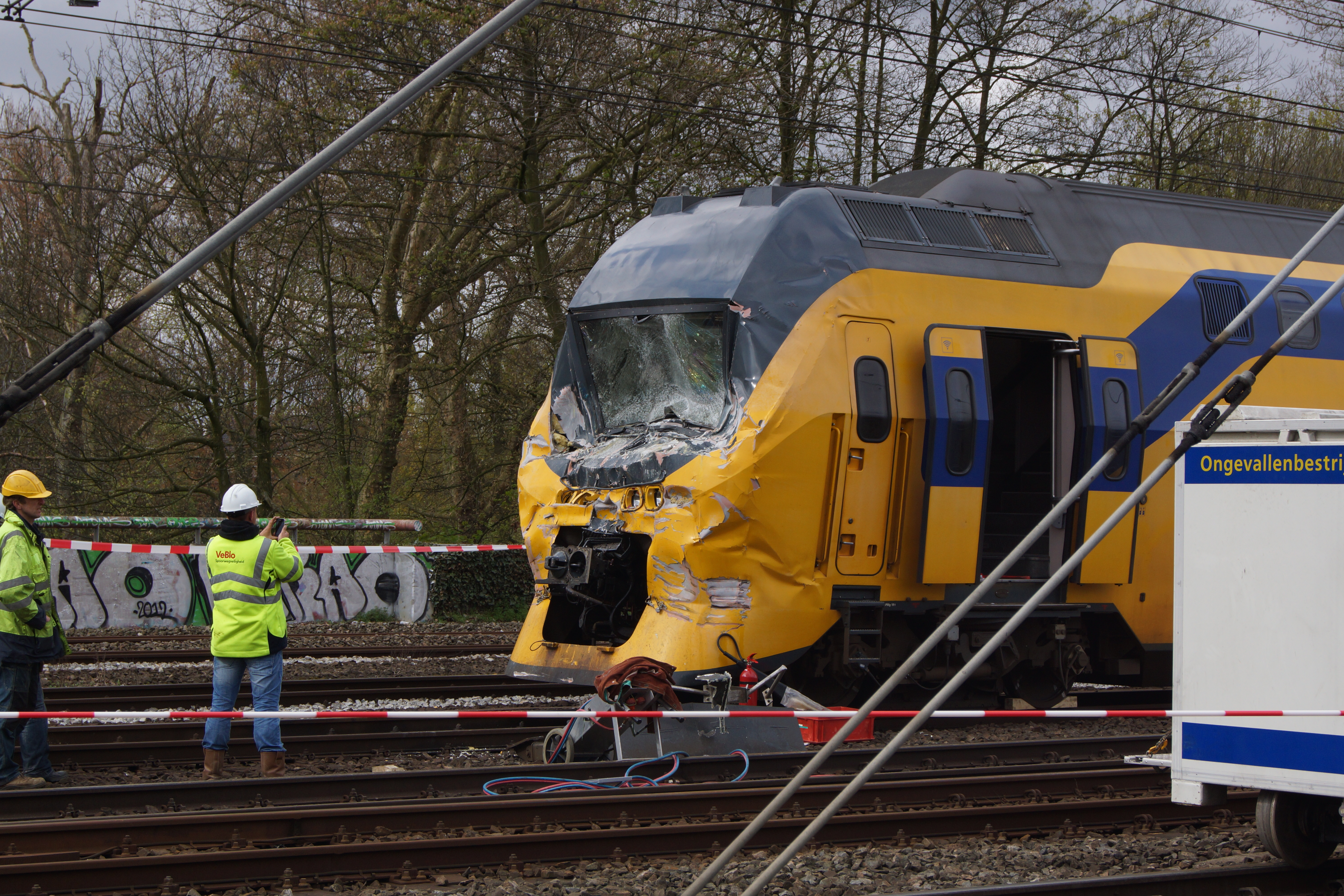
Damage to the cab of the Class 8700 after the other train had been removed

Emergency services were swiftly on the scene. Many people were rescued from the train wreckage either by using cranes or by being placed in a protective wrap, with some carried out on stretchers. A trauma helicopter was used to take some of the people to a nearby hospital. Many of the injured were treated on a bridge nearby. Those that had only minor injuries were taken to an Amsterdam hotel. People were reported to have suffered broken bones, bruising and neck injuries.

== Investigations ==
Two separate investigations were carried out into whether the train collision was by human error or by a technical fault on one of the trains. By 22 April, the damaged trains had been towed away by locomotives allowing technicians to inspect the track for damage. The director of Nederlandse Spoorwegen, Bert Meerstadt, said it was still too early to guess the actual cause of the incident and it was necessary to await the conclusions of the investigation. The Dutch Safety Board (DSB, in Dutch: Onderzoeksraad Voor Veiligheid, OVV) conducted one of the investigations, whilst the other was being conducted by the Human Environment and Transport Inspectorate (Inspectie Leefomgeving en Transport, ILT). The data recorders were recovered from both trains.

=== ILT accident research ===
The possibility of the driver having overrun a stop signal was taken into account during ILT's research into the cause(s) of the crash; however, Transport Minister Melanie Schultz van Haegen was quoted as saying that further research was required to see if initial findings would be confirmed. De Telegraaf reports that the driver may not face prosecution however as a report submitted by ProRail, the operator of the line, to the ILT, showed the signal in question was part of an older system and it is guessed that if it had been one of the more modern signals, fitted with upgraded safety equipment, the train would have stopped in time.

=== DSB research ===
The Dutch Safety Board research looked at a number of questions. In particular, they investigated why the trains collided, and why the accident caused over 100 injuries and one fatality considering the marginal speed at the crash site. Prevention of accidents starts with an accurate time schedule. The presence of Signals at Danger in regular circumstance has had little priority in the past. The driver as well as the signalman could have intervened but the DSB put in question why they did not do so or why the security system did not activate. Finally it continued to also focus on the visibility of the actual signal.

In December 2012 DSB published its final report. It determined that the culpability of the driver of the local train missing a signal at danger could be reduced. The driver fairly expected a stopping signal, but she could have been distracted by a freight train passing nearby. That particular train only carried a single rear light, which she wanted to report.

Shortly after passing the signal at danger the safety system allowed the local train to accelerate to 60 km/h (37 mph). This was the speed limit transmitted to the intercity. In regular circumstances the second train entering a section of track should short the track circuit, warning both trains, but because of a set of points in the track this didn't happen until the local train passed the points. When the respective drivers suspected the impending danger, the intercity train was travelling at 53 km/h (33 mph) and the local train at 43 km/h (27 mph). By applying the emergency brake the trains managed to decelerate to 25–30 km/h (16–19 mph) and 20 km/h (12 mph) respectively.

There were several contributing factors to the cause and severity of the collision. Because of scheduled maintenance only a single track was available between the lower-level platforms of Amsterdam Sloterdijk and Amsterdam Central station. The modified timetable the intercity and the local train supposed to use that short section of single track just three minutes after each other, the local train supposed to wait for one minute at the signal before passing. Three minutes is the minimum time interval for passages over single track sections allowed by regulation. Because of a delayed freighter train the intercity was two minutes late, causing the trains to arrive at the single track section simultaneously.

The railyard the collision approached is protected using ATB First Generation, which only warns for signals at danger and enforces a low approach speed. An improvement, ATB-Vv (Verbeterde versie, "improved version") exists and could have stopped the local train before passing the signal. Although this system had been installed on the train and the signal in question was planned to support ATB-Vv, it had not been installed there yet. The DSB questioned the slow rate at which ATB-Vv is implemented in the Netherlands.

Despite both trains colliding at a low speed, the number and severity of the injuries was considerable. After the collision, people were catapulted through the train and hit objects such as panels, seats and tables, causing severe injuries, and a single fatality. The DSB argued those objects have not been adequately designed for possible crashes. It recommended that train constructors should consider an improved crash-proof design in passenger carriages.

== Aftermath ==
Prorail and NS paid compensation to victims. Dozens of passengers attempted to make fraudulent claims: one person tried to claim for a Stradivarius violin, while another claimed to have missed an important modelling competition because of the accident. The most frequently claimed loss was an iPad.

== See also ==
- Automatische treinbeïnvloeding (ATB) a Dutch train protection system
- List of rail accidents (2010–2019)
- Train protection system (TPS)
