= Dutch Transport Safety Board =

Government agency, 1999–2005

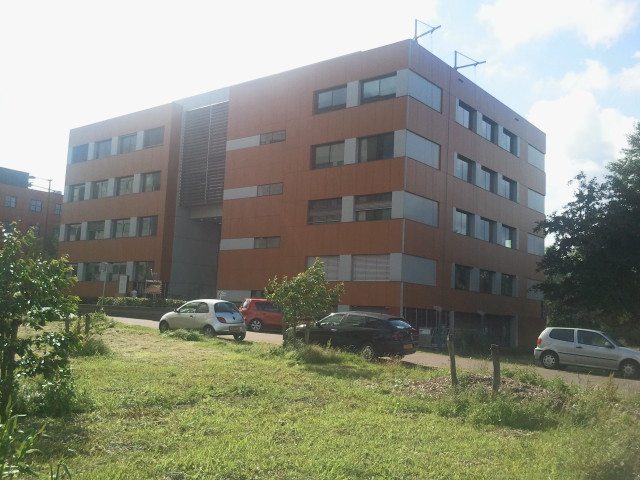
The later head office of the RvTV in The Hague

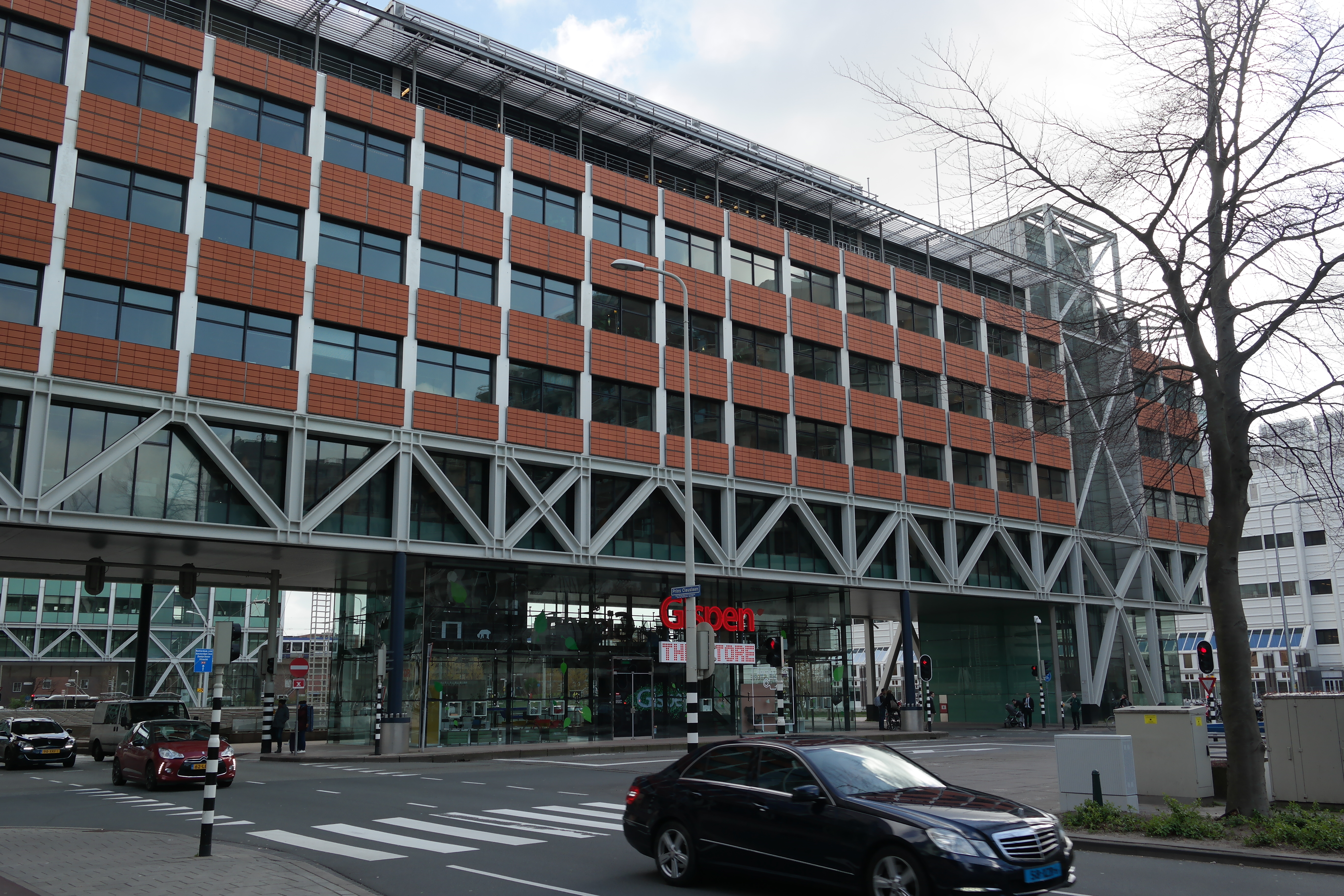
Bruggebouw West, the earlier head office

The Dutch Transport Safety Board (Raad voor de Transportveiligheid, RvTV) was an agency of the government of the Netherlands. Its head office was originally on the fifth floor of the Bruggebouw West in The Hague. It later moved to Anna van Saksenlaan 50.

The agency was established on 1 July 1999. The Netherlands Aviation Safety Board was merged into the RvTV on 1 July 1999.

The agency had four departments: Aviation, Rail, Road Transport, and Shipping.

It was replaced in 2005 by the Dutch Safety Board.
