= Coordinated Regional Incident Management (Netherlands) =

Emergency management procedure in the Netherlands

The Coordinated Regional Incident-Management Procedure or Gecoördineerde Regionale Incidentbestrijdings Procedure (GRIP) is a nationwide emergency management procedure in the Netherlands. The procedure is used by all emergency services, different layers of government and government agencies.

The nationwide digital communication system C2000 is used for communications between the various emergency services and the policy teams and coordination centres.

== Stages ==
The procedure is scaled according to the affected area of an incident. There are four stages with an unofficial Stage 0 for normal day-to-day operations during small incidents.

| Phase | Affected area |
|---|---|
| GRIP 0 | Source-suppression. Day-to-day routine operations, no special coordination necessary. |
| GRIP 1 | Source-suppression. Incident of limited proportions, harmonisation necessary between the various emergency services. |
| GRIP 2 | Source- and effect suppression. Incident with a definite effect on the surrounding area. |
| GRIP 3 | Threatened well-being of (large groups of) the population within a single municipality. |
| GRIP 4 | More than one municipality |
| GRIP 5 | GRIP 4, multiple regions |
| GRIP State | Guidance by state required to preserve national safety |

=== GRIP 1 ===
Due to the nature of the incident several emergency services are needed (fire, Emergency medical services, police) and their deployment needs coordination. A coordination team consisting of duty officers of the involved services is set up; there is no single commander.

=== GRIP 2 ===
A single command is established. This team is housed at a central location in the region and consists of managers of the involved services. The mayor of the affected municipality is informed; she will order (part of) the municipal policy team to convene. Since the mayor is the commander in chief in civilian emergencies her policy team will advise her on further actions such as evacuations.

=== GRIP 3 ===
A large area is affected. The mayor will order his full policy team and the municipal disaster management team to convene. The regional operational team will also convene in full composition.

A mayor of one of the municipalities in the region is appointed as coordinating mayor; this is usually the mayor of the largest city in the region. This person chairs the regional policy team which further consists of chiefs of the emergency services and other advisors. The King's Commissioner is informed, who in turn informs the Minister of the Interior.

The incident can formally be classified as a disaster, although GRIP 3 can also be used in case of an impending disaster.

=== GRIP 4 ===
The effects of the disaster affect more than one municipality or even more than one province or country. The King's Commissioner orders the Provincial Coordination Center (PCC) into action. The mayors of the affected municipalities still function as commanders in chief in their own areas, but the commissioner has the power to give mayors orders. The commissioner has a coordinating role as long as the incident's effects do not affect other provinces. If other provinces are affected the Minister of the Interior assumes the coordinating role; he has the power to give the King's Commissioners orders. The minister will make use of the National Coordination Centre (NCC), which is continuously staffed. The NCC functions as an international point of contact when other nations are involved, either as affected areas or when providing assistance.
