= Bert Meerstadt =

Dutch businessman

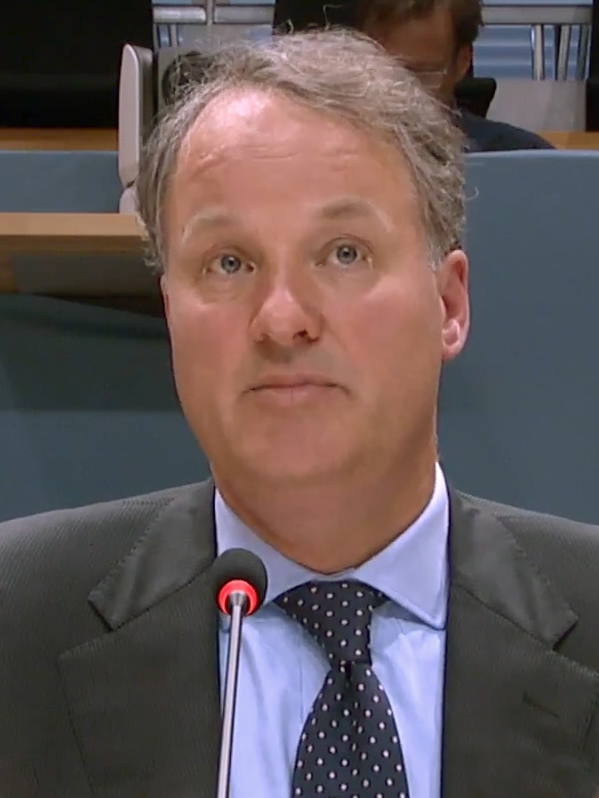
- Bert Meerstadt (2015)
- Born: A. Bert Meerstadt; 13 October 1961 (age 64); The Hague, Netherlands
- Education: Delft University of Technology; INSEAD
- Occupation: CEO of Baarsma Wine Group
- Known for: CEO of Nederlandse Spoorwegen (2009-13)
- Board member of: ABN-AMRO; Lucas Bols (-2016)

A. Bert Meerstadt (born 13 October 1961) is a Dutch businessman. He was chairman of the management Board and CEO of Nederlandse Spoorwegen from January 2009 to October 2013.

Meerstadt received a master's degree in architectural engineering from Delft University of Technology in 1986, and an MBA from INSEAD in 1988.

Since 2014 Meerstadt is a director of Talgo, Spain.

He was a director of ABN-AMRO.

In April 2016, Meerstadt resigned from the supervisory board of Lucas Bols.

Since 2016 he is chairman of Coffreo, France.

He is on the board of the Dutch digital consultancy SparkOptimus.
